= Coney Island =

Neighborhood in New York City

- Neighborhood
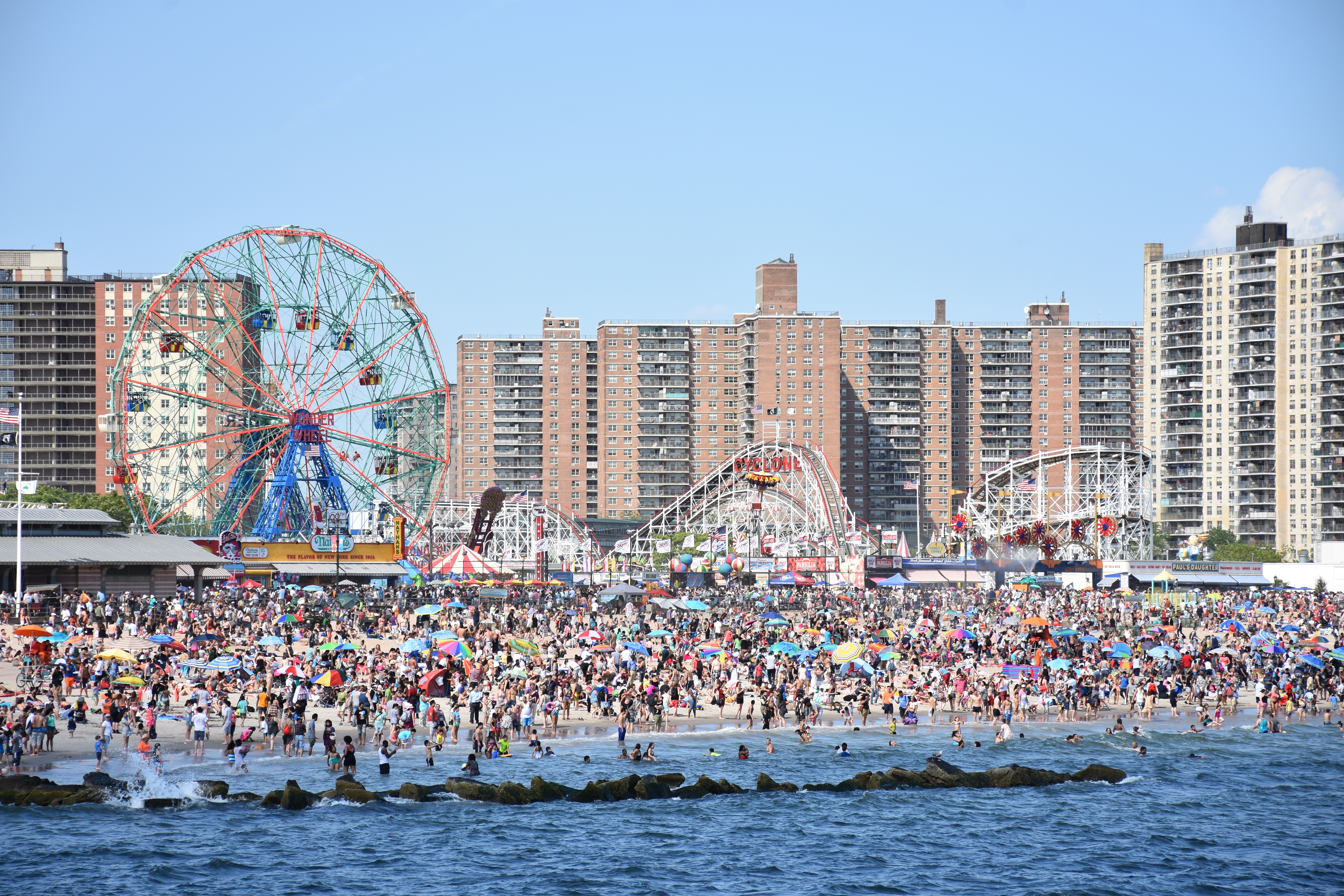
- Coney Island beach, amusement parks, and high-rises, as seen from the pier in June 2016
- Nickname: "Playground of the World"
- Interactive map of Coney Island
- Coordinates: 40.5750°N 73.9825°W
- Country: United States
- State: New York
- City: New York City
- Borough: Brooklyn
- Community District: Brooklyn 13
- Settled: 17th century
- Founder: Dutch settlers

Area
  - Total: 1.790 km^{2} (0.691 sq mi)

Population (2020)
  - Total: 32,259
  - Density: 18,020/km^{2} (46,680/sq mi)
- Time zone: UTC−5:00 (Eastern)
  - Summer (DST): UTC−4:00 (EDT)
- ZIP Code: 11224
- Area code: 718, 347, 929, and 917

Coney Island is a neighborhood and entertainment area in the southwestern section of the New York City borough of Brooklyn. The neighborhood is bounded by Brighton Beach to its east, Lower New York Bay to the south and west, and Gravesend to the north and includes the subsection of Sea Gate on its west. The Coney Island peninsula consists of Coney Island proper, Sea Gate, Brighton Beach, and Manhattan Beach. Coney Island was formerly an actual island, the westernmost in the Outer Barrier on the southern shore of Long Island, but in the early 20th century it became connected to the rest of Long Island by land fill.

The origin of Coney Island's name is disputed, though coney is an old word for rabbit, but the area was originally part of the colonial town of Gravesend. By the mid-19th century it had become a seaside resort, and by the late 19th century, amusement parks had also been built at the location. The attractions reached a historical peak during the first half of the 20th century. However, they declined in popularity after World War II and, following years of neglect, several structures were torn down. Various redevelopment projects were proposed for Coney Island in the 1970s through the 2000s, though most of these were not carried out. The area was revitalized with the opening of the venue now known as Maimonides Park in 2001 and several amusement rides starting in the 2010s.

Coney Island had around 32,000 residents as of the 2020 United States census. The neighborhood is ethnically diverse, and the neighborhood's poverty rate of 27% is slightly higher than that of the city as a whole.

Coney Island is part of Brooklyn Community District 13, and its primary ZIP Code is 11224. It is patrolled by the 60th Precinct of the New York City Police Department. Fire services are provided by the New York City Fire Department's Engine 245/Ladder 161/Battalion 43 and Engine 318/Ladder 166. Politically, Coney Island is represented by the New York City Council's 47th District. The area is well served by the New York City Subway and local bus routes, and contains several public elementary and middle schools.

== Geography and climate ==
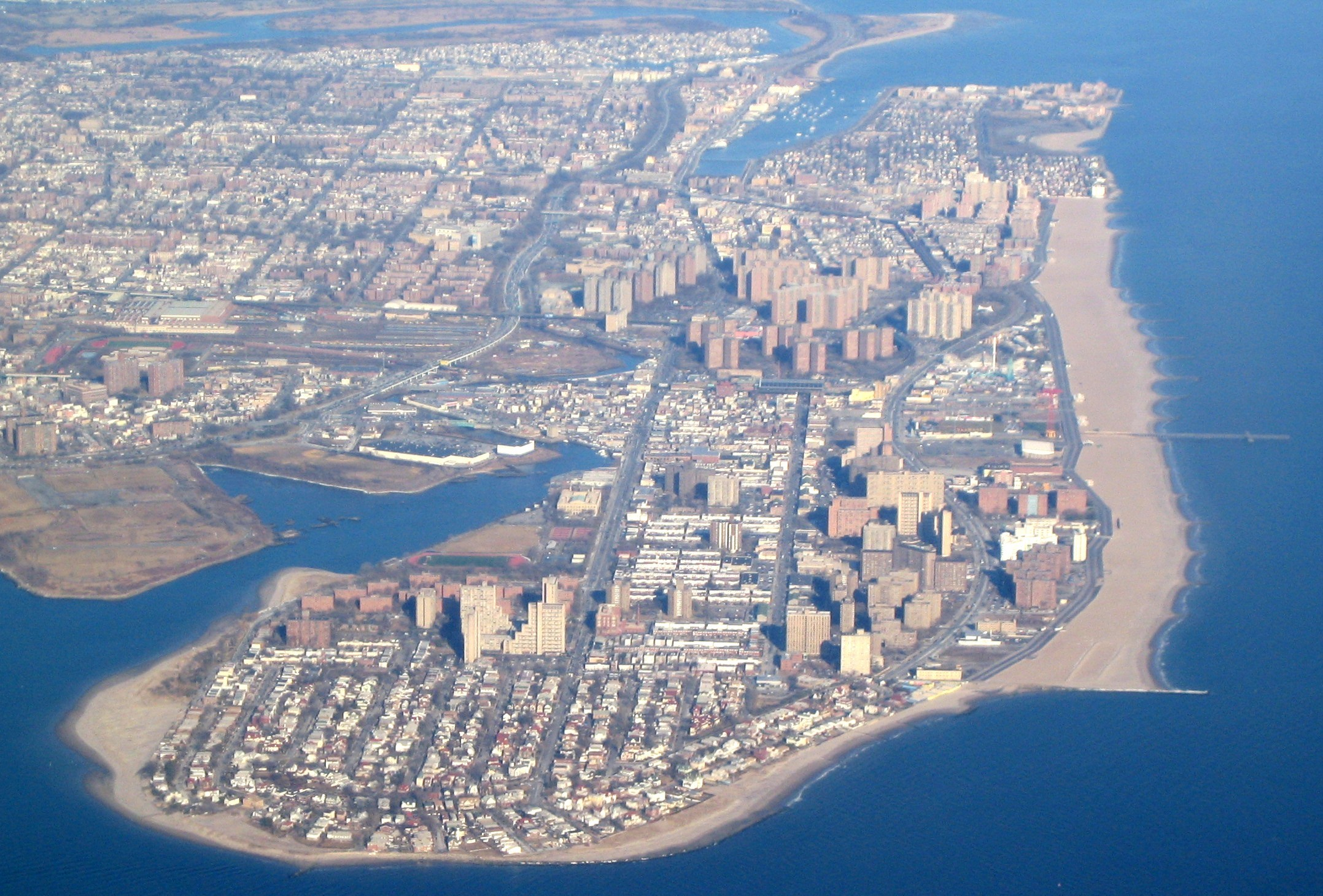
Aerial view of the Coney Island neighborhood, which occupies the western end of the Coney Island peninsula

The neighborhood is situated on the western portion of the Coney Island peninsula, located on the western end of Long Island lying to the west of the Outer Barrier islands along Long Island's southern shore. The peninsula is about 4 miles (6.4 km) long and 0.5 miles (0.80 km) wide. It extends into Lower New York Bay with Sheepshead Bay to its northeast, Gravesend Bay and Coney Island Creek to its northwest, and the main part of Brooklyn to its north. At its highest it is 7 feet (2.1 m) above sea level. Coney Island was formerly an actual island, separated from greater Brooklyn by Coney Island Creek, and was the westernmost of the Outer Barrier islands. A large section of the creek was filled in the 1920s and 1930s, turning the island into a peninsula. The Encyclopedia of New York City considers the area west of Ocean Parkway (including Sea Gate and Nortons Point Light) to be part of the Coney Island neighborhood.

The perimeter of Coney Island features manmade structures designed to maintain its current shape. The beaches are currently not a natural feature; the sand that is naturally supposed to replenish Coney Island is cut off by the jetty at Breezy Point, Queens. Sand has been redeposited on the beaches via beach nourishment since the construction of Riegelmann Boardwalk in 1922–1923, and is held in place by around two dozen groynes. A large sand-replenishing project along Coney Island and Brighton Beach took place in the 1990s. Sheepshead Bay at the peninsula's northeast corner is, for the most part, enclosed in bulkheads. Two major parks, Kaiser Park and Coney Island Creek Park, are located on the northwest side of the peninsula along Coney Island Creek. A 2023 study found that Coney Island was sinking at a rate of about 2.6 ± 0.8 millimeters (0.102 ± 0.031 in) per year, making it among the fastest-sinking locations in New York City; this is mainly because parts of the neighborhood were created by land reclamation.

Coney Island has a humid subtropical climate (Cfa) and the hardiness zone is 7b.

Climate data for Coney Island, Brooklyn
Month	Jan	Feb	Mar	Apr	May	Jun	Jul	Aug	Sep	Oct	Nov	Dec	Year
Record high °F (°C)	70 (21)	73 (23)	83 (28)	93 (34)	98 (37)	99 (37)	105 (41)	101 (38)	98 (37)	91 (33)	80 (27)	75 (24)	105 (41)
Mean daily maximum °F (°C)	39 (4)	42 (6)	50 (10)	60 (16)	70 (21)	79 (26)	84 (29)	83 (28)	76 (24)	65 (18)	54 (12)	44 (7)	62 (17)
Mean daily minimum °F (°C)	25 (−4)	27 (−3)	34 (1)	43 (6)	53 (12)	63 (17)	69 (21)	67 (19)	60 (16)	49 (9)	40 (4)	31 (−1)	47 (8)
Record low °F (°C)	−4 (−20)	−2 (−19)	7 (−14)	19 (−7)	35 (2)	44 (7)	51 (11)	50 (10)	39 (4)	29 (−2)	17 (−8)	−1 (−18)	−4 (−20)
Average precipitation inches (mm)	3.86 (98)	2.99 (76)	4.07 (103)	4.03 (102)	4.40 (112)	3.61 (92)	4.45 (113)	4.16 (106)	4.12 (105)	3.41 (87)	3.86 (98)	3.63 (92)	46.56 (1,183)
Average snowfall inches (cm)	6.7 (17)	7.5 (19)	3.9 (9.9)	0.7 (1.8)	0 (0)	0 (0)	0 (0)	0 (0)	0 (0)	0 (0)	0.3 (0.76)	3.6 (9.1)	22.7 (58)

== Name ==
The original Native American inhabitants of the region, the Lenape, called this area Narrioch, possibly meaning "land without shadows" or "always in light" in reference to its sunlit south-facing beaches. A second possible meaning is "point" or "corner of land". The "island" was originally several smaller historical islands, each being given a name by Dutch settlers, with the westernmost sand spit or point named Conyne Eylandt in early-17th-century Dutch maps, starting with the 1639 Manatus Map.

There is no clear historical consensus on how the island got the name "Coney Island", in regular use in the first half of the 19th century with the advent of regular ferry service to the island, but several theories have been put forward. One possible etymology is from a Native American tribe, the Konoh or Konoi (the "Bear Band"), who once inhabited the island. A second theory suggests that it was distortion of the name of Henry Hudson's second mate on the Halve Maen, John Colman, who was slain by natives on the 1609 expedition. A third posits that late 18th century Irish captain Peter O'Connor named it after Coney Island in County Sligo, Ireland, which has a rabbit population. In Irish coinín is the word used for a rabbit. Yet other theories suggest a Dutch etymology: one theory holds that the name had come from Conyn, the surname of a family of Dutch settlers who lived there, and another suggests that it came from the Dutch word for rabbit, konijn, derived from a purported large population of wild rabbits on the island".

There is little evidence for each origin theory, and there are conflicts between the pieces of evidence that do exist. The most popular idea is the translation of the Dutch word for "rabbit" into the English word coney, but that has its detractors and counter explanations. In 1816, politician and U.S. Founding Father Egbert Benson presented a treatise on New York place names and said it was "Conyn's Island", after the Dutch surname, and noted "there are already symptoms of the beginning of a tradition that it once abounded in Rabbits". Other historians claim that rabbits were introduced to the island only after it was settled. The 19th century also saw the heavily Irish New York Tammany Hall political machine controlling development of the island, and they may have gotten the name from the island in County Sligo rather than any tale of a rabbit population.

== History ==
=== Early settlement ===
Giovanni da Verrazzano was the first European explorer to sight the island of Narrioch during his expeditions to the area in 1527 and 1529. He was subsequently followed by Henry Hudson. Anthony Janszoon van Salee was the first New Netherland settler to acquire land adjacent to Coney Island, in 1639. The Native American population in the area dwindled as the Dutch settlement grew and the entire southern tier of present-day Brooklyn, from Gowanus Creek to Coney Island to Gerritsen Creek, was purchased in 1645 from the Native Americans in exchange for goods. The goods were not recorded in the deed, but later accounts mention a gun, a blanket, and a kettle.

In 1644, a colonist named Guysbert Op Dyck was given a land patent for 88 acres of land in what became the town of Gravesend, on the southwestern shore of Brooklyn. The land patent included Conyne Island, an island just off the southwestern shore of the town of Gravesend, as well as Conyne Hook, a peninsula just east of the island. Both became part of Gravesend when its first town charter was granted a year later, in 1645. East of Conyne Hook was the largest section of island called Gysbert's, Guysbert's, or Guisbert's Island (also called Johnson Island), containing most of the arable land and extending east through today's Brighton Beach and Manhattan Beach. This was the first official real estate transaction for the island. Op Dyck never occupied his land, and in 1661 he sold it off to Dick De Wolf. The land's new owner banned Gravesend residents from using Guisbert's Island and built a salt-works on the land, provoking outrage among Gravesend livestock herders. New Amsterdam was transferred to the English in 1664, and four years later, the English Governor created a new charter for Gravesend that excluded Coney Island. Subsequently, Guisbert's Island was divided into plots meted out to several dozen settlers. However, in 1685, the island became part of Gravesend again as a result of a new charter with the Native Americans.

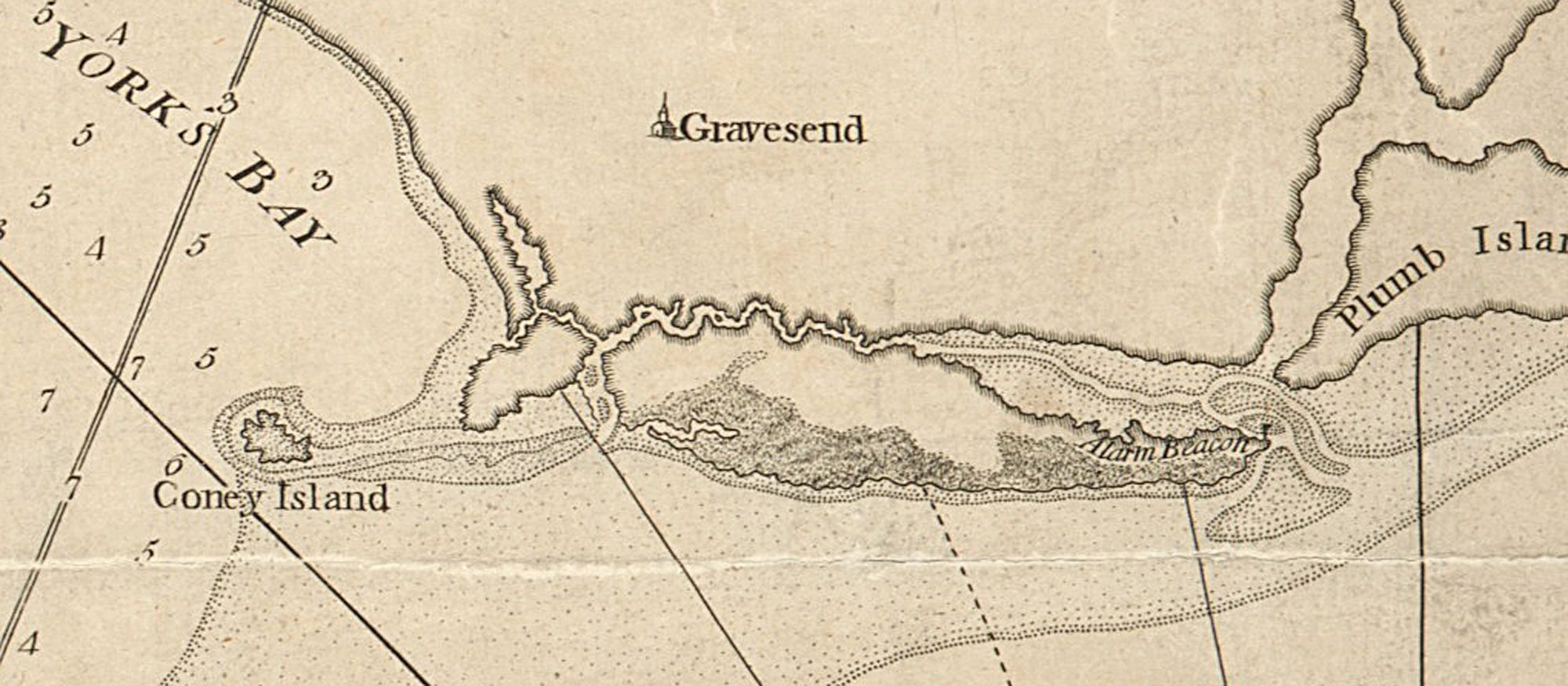
Detail of a 1776 nautical chart showing the collection of islands and shifting sand that eventually became present-day Coney Island

At the time of European settlement, the land that makes up the present-day Coney Island was divided across several separate islands. All of these islands were part of the outer barrier on the southern shore of Long Island, and their land areas and boundaries changed frequently. Only the westernmost island was called Coney Island; it currently makes up part of Sea Gate. At the time, it was a 1.25-mile shifting sandspit with a detached island at its western end extending into Lower New York Bay. In a 1679–1680 journal, Jasper Danckaerts and Peter Sluyter noted that "Conijnen Eylandt" was fully separated from the rest of Brooklyn. The explorers observed that "Nobody lives upon it, but it is used in winter for keeping cattle, horses, oxen, hogs and others."

By the early 18th century, the town of Gravesend was periodically granting seven-year-long leases to freeholders, who would then have the exclusive use of Coney Hook and Coney Island. In 1734, a road to Coney Hook was laid out. Thomas Stillwell, a prominent Gravesend resident who was the freeholder for Coney Island and Coney Hook at the time, proposed to build a ditch through Coney Hook so it would be easier for his cattle to graze. He convinced several friends in the nearby town of Jamaica to help him in this effort, telling them that the creation of such a ditch would allow them to ship goods from Jamaica Bay to New York Harbor without having to venture out into the ocean. In 1750, the "Jamaica Ditch" was dug through Coney Hook from Brown's Creek in the west to Hubbard's Creek in the east. The creation of the canal turned Coney Hook into a detached 0.5-mile-long (0.80 km) island called Pine Island, so named due to the woods on it.

Each island was separated by an inlet that could only be crossed at low tide. By the end of the 18th century, the ongoing shifting of sand along the barrier islands had closed up the inlets to the point that residents began filling them in and joining them as one island. Development of Coney Island was slow until the 19th century due to land disputes, the American Revolutionary War, and the War of 1812.

=== Resort development ===
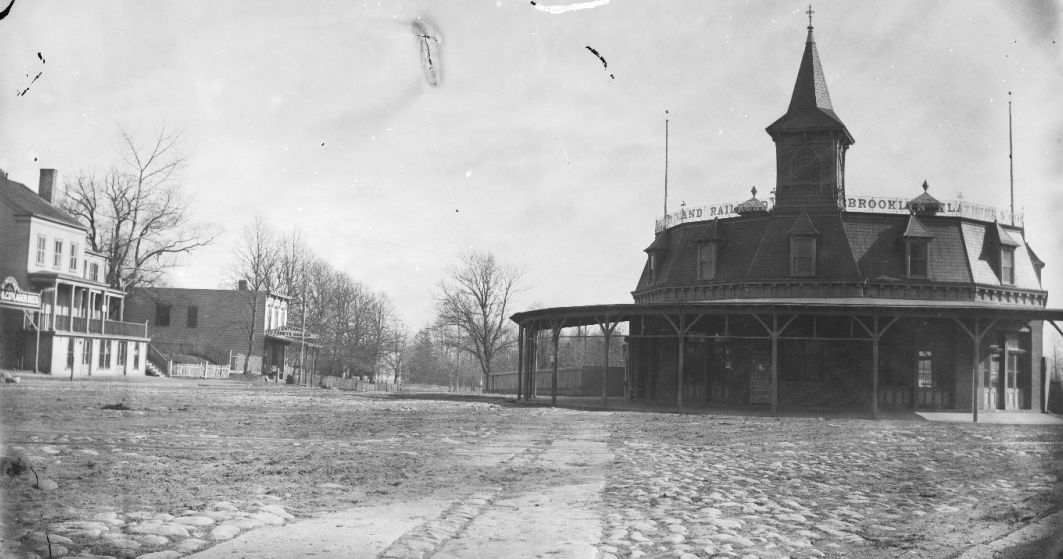
Railroad station in Coney Island, Brooklyn, c. 1872–1887

In 1824, the Gravesend and Coney Island Road and Bridge Company built the first bridge across Jamaica Ditch (by now known as Coney Island Creek), connecting the island with the mainland. The company also built a shell road across the island to the beaches. In 1829, the company also built the first hotel on the island: the Coney Island House, near present-day Sea Gate.

Due to Coney Island's proximity to Manhattan and other boroughs, and its simultaneous relative distance from the city of Brooklyn to provide the illusion of a proper vacation, it began attracting vacationers in the 1830s and 1840s, assisted by carriage roads and steamship service that reduced travel time from a formerly half-day journey to two hours. Most of the vacationers were wealthy and went by carriage. Inventor Samuel Colt built an observation tower on the peninsula in 1845, but he abandoned the project soon after. In 1847, the middle class started going to Coney Island upon the introduction of a ferry line to Norton's Point—named during the mid-1870s after hotel owner Michael Norton—at the western portion of the peninsula. Gang activity started as well, with one 1870s writer noting that going to Coney Island could result in losing money and even lives. The Brooklyn, Bath and Coney Island Railroad became the first railroad to reach Coney Island when it opened in 1864, and it was completed in 1867. Over the next 13 years, four more railroads were built specifically to transport visitors to Coney Island; this was part of a larger national trend toward trolley park development.

In 1868, William A. Engeman built a resort in the area. The resort was given the name "Brighton Beach" in 1878 by Henry C. Murphy and a group of businessmen, who chose the name as an allusion to the English resort city of Brighton. With the help of Gravesend's surveyor William Stillwell, Engeman acquired all 39 lots for the relatively low cost of $20,000. This 460-by-210-foot (140 by 64 m) hotel, with rooms for up to 5,000 people nightly and meals for up to 20,000 people daily, was close to the then-rundown western Coney Island, so it was mostly the upper middle class that went to this hotel. The 400-foot (120 m), double-decker Brighton Beach Bathing Pavilion was also built nearby and opened in 1878, with the capacity for 1,200 bathers. Hotel Brighton, also known as the Brighton Beach Hotel, was situated on the beach at what is now the foot of Coney Island Avenue. The Brooklyn, Flatbush, and Coney Island Railway, the predecessor to the New York City Subway's present-day Brighton Line, opened on July 2, 1878, and provided access to the hotel.

Simultaneously, wealthy banker Austin Corbin was developing adjacent Manhattan Beach after being interested in the area during a trip to the beach to heal his sick son. Corbin, who worked on Wall Street and had many railroad investments, built the New York and Manhattan Beach Railway for his two luxury shoreline hotels. These hotels were used by the wealthy upper class, who would not go to Brighton Beach because of its proximity to Coney Island. The 150-room Manhattan Beach Hotel—which was designed by J. Pickering Putnam and contained restaurants, ballrooms, and shops—was opened for business in July 1877 at a ceremony presided over by President Ulysses S. Grant. The similarly prodigal Oriental Hotel, which hosted rooms for wealthy families staying for extended periods, was opened in August 1880.

Andrew Culver, president of the Prospect Park and Coney Island Railroad, had built the Culver Line steam railway to West Brighton in 1875, before Corbin and Engeman had even built their railroads. For 35 cents, one could ride the Prospect Park & Coney Island Railroad to the Culver Depot terminal at Surf Avenue. Across the street from the terminal, the 300-foot (91 m) Iron Tower (also known as the Centennial Observatory), bought from the 1876 Philadelphia Exposition, provided patrons with a bird's-eye view of the coast. The nearby "Camera Obscura" similarly used mirrors and lens to provide a panoramic view of the area. Coney Island became a major resort destination after the Civil War as excursion railroads and the Coney Island & Brooklyn Railroad streetcar line reached the area in the 1860s and 1870s, followed by the Iron Steamboat Company ferry to Manhattan in 1881.

The 150-suite Cable Hotel was built nearby in 1875. Next to it, on a 12-acre (4.9 ha) piece of land leased by James Voorhies, maitre d' Paul Bauer built the western peninsula's largest hotel, which opened in 1876. By the turn of the century, Victorian hotels, private bathhouses, and vaudeville theaters were a common sight on Coney Island. The three resort areas—Brighton Beach, Manhattan Beach and West Brighton—competed with each other for clientele. By the early 1900s, West Brighton had gradually become the most popular destination, and as such, became associated with the lively amusement area of Coney Island.

In the 1890s, Norton's Point on the western side of Coney Island was developed into Sea Gate, a gated summer community that catered mainly to the wealthy. A private yacht carried visitors directly from the Battery at the southern tip of Manhattan Island. Notable tenants within the community included the Atlantic Yacht Club, which built a colonial style house along the waterfront.

=== Amusement park era ===
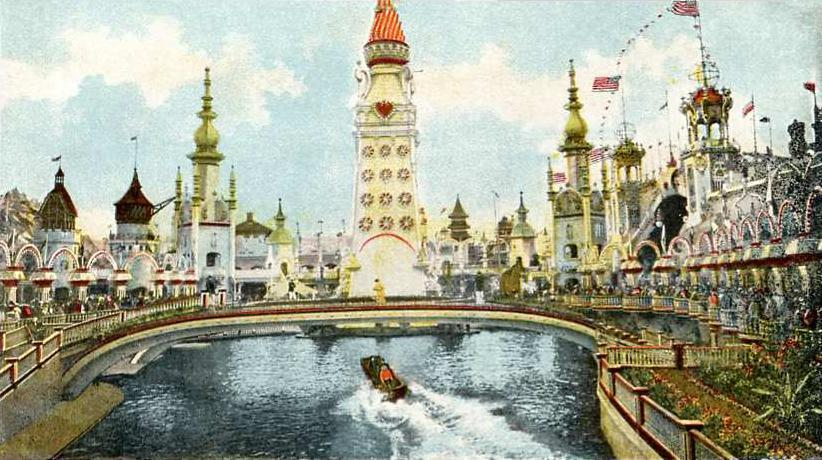
One of the large parks, Luna Park, Main Lagoon, 1907

Between about 1880 and World War II, Coney Island was the largest amusement area in the United States, attracting several million visitors per year. Its development as an amusement area was concurrent with the erection of urban amusement parks elsewhere in the United States, which changed amusement from a passive to an active concept. Of these amusement areas, Coney Island was the largest. At its height, it contained three competing major amusement parks—Luna Park, Dreamland, and Steeplechase Park—as well as many independent amusements. The area was also the center of new technological events and innovations including electric lights, roller coasters, and baby incubators. By the first decade of the 20th century, Coney Island was seen as a top getaway and "a symbol of Americans' increasing pride".

==== 19th century ====
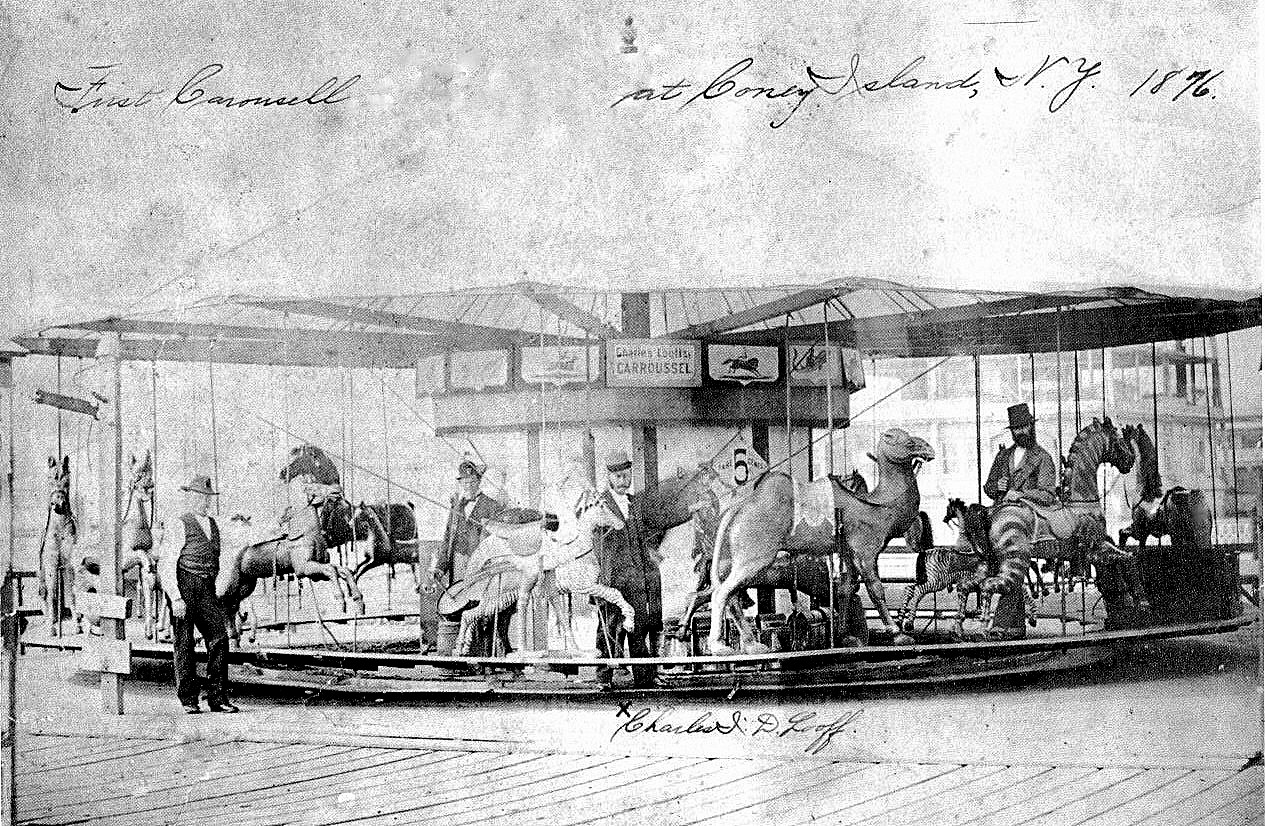
First Coney Island Charles Looff carousel

By the late 1870s, Coney Island's hotels had drawn people from many different social classes, and attractions were being built. When the Brooklyn Rapid Transit Company electrified the steam railroads and connected Brooklyn to Manhattan via the Brooklyn Bridge at the beginning of the 20th century, Coney Island turned rapidly from a resort to an accessible location for day-trippers seeking to escape the summer heat in New York City's tenements. Charles I. D. Looff, a Danish woodcarver, built the first carousel and amusement ride at Coney Island in 1876, at Lucy Vandeveer's bath-house complex at West 6th Street and Surf Avenue. Looff personally hand-carved the designs into the carousel. Looff subsequently commissioned another carousel at Feltman's Ocean Pavilion in 1880. Another early attraction was the Seaside Aquarium, which operated from 1877 to 1887 and included aquatic exhibits, aviaries, zoo attractions, and various sideshows. The earliest rides, including Looff's first carousel and the Seaside Aquarium, were located at the Centennial Observatory's site. The first sideshows and fireworks displays came to Coney Island in 1883, and combined with constant musical performances, brought increased excitement to the area.

The very first roller coaster at Coney Island was the Switchback Railway, a gravity coaster installed by LaMarcus Adna Thompson at West 10th Street in 1884. Nearby was the Elephantine Colossus, a seven-story building (including a brothel) in the shape of an elephant, which opened the following year. Until its demolition in 1896, the elephant was the first sight to greet immigrants arriving in New York, who would see it before they saw the Statue of Liberty. Next to be developed were horse-racing tracks, and by 1890, Coney Island had three tracks: Sheepshead Bay Race Track, Brighton Beach Race Course, and Gravesend Race Track. Julian Ralph described Coney Island in 1896 as "the first made-to-order resort in America", with many businesses having "leaped from nothing into full fledged perfection". However, crime and corruption in Coney Island were prevalent. The main leader of this corruption was John Y. McKane, who ran prizefighting rings behind the elephant until he was arrested and sentenced in 1894.

The development of amusement rides in Coney Island intensified in the 1890s with the opening of amusement parks. The first such park was Sea Lion Park, which operated from 1895 to 1902 and was the first amusement park to charge entry fees. Sea Lion Park's opening spurred the construction of George C. Tilyou's Steeplechase Park, which opened in 1897. The Coney Island "Funny Face" logo, which is still extant, dates to the early days of Steeplechase Park.

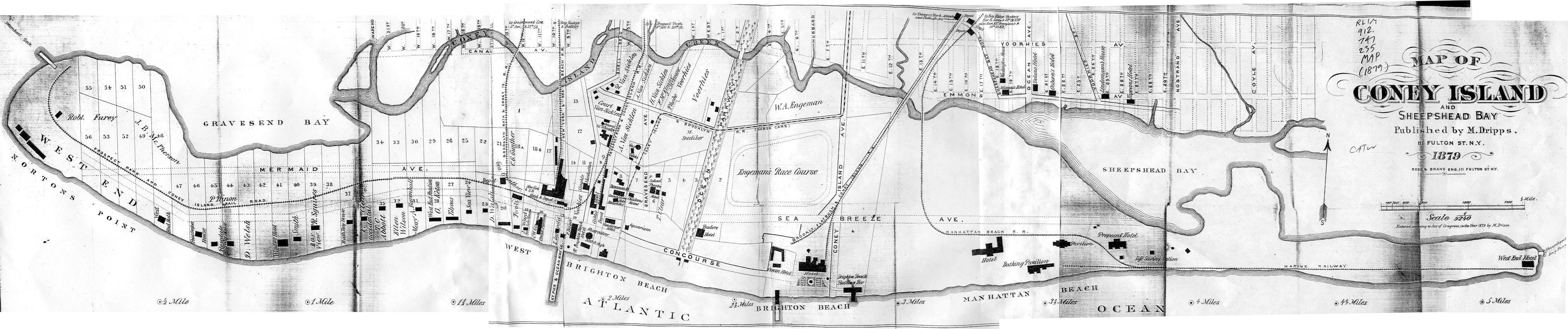
Map of Coney Island in 1879

==== Early 20th century ====
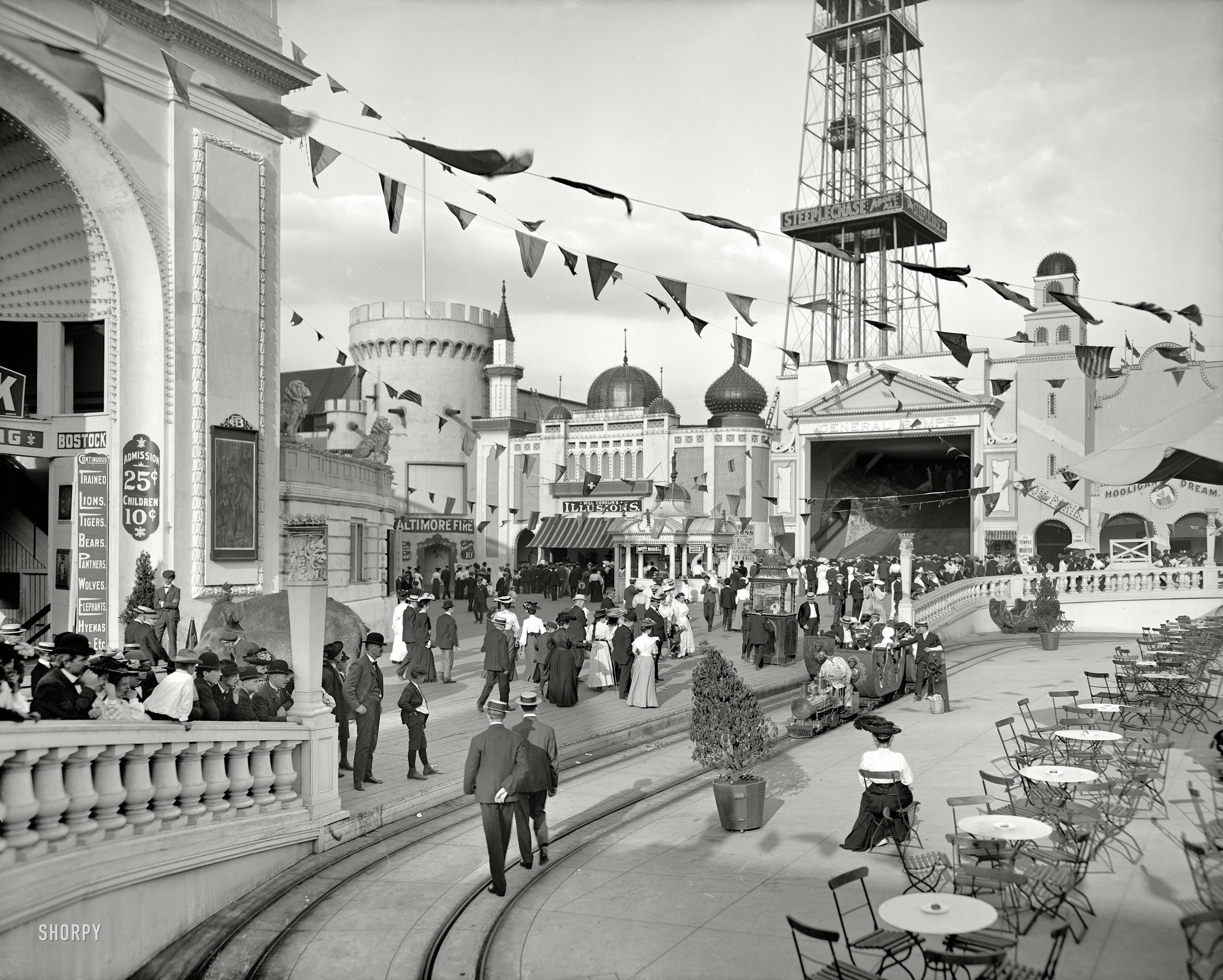
Dreamland, one of the three large parks, c. 1905

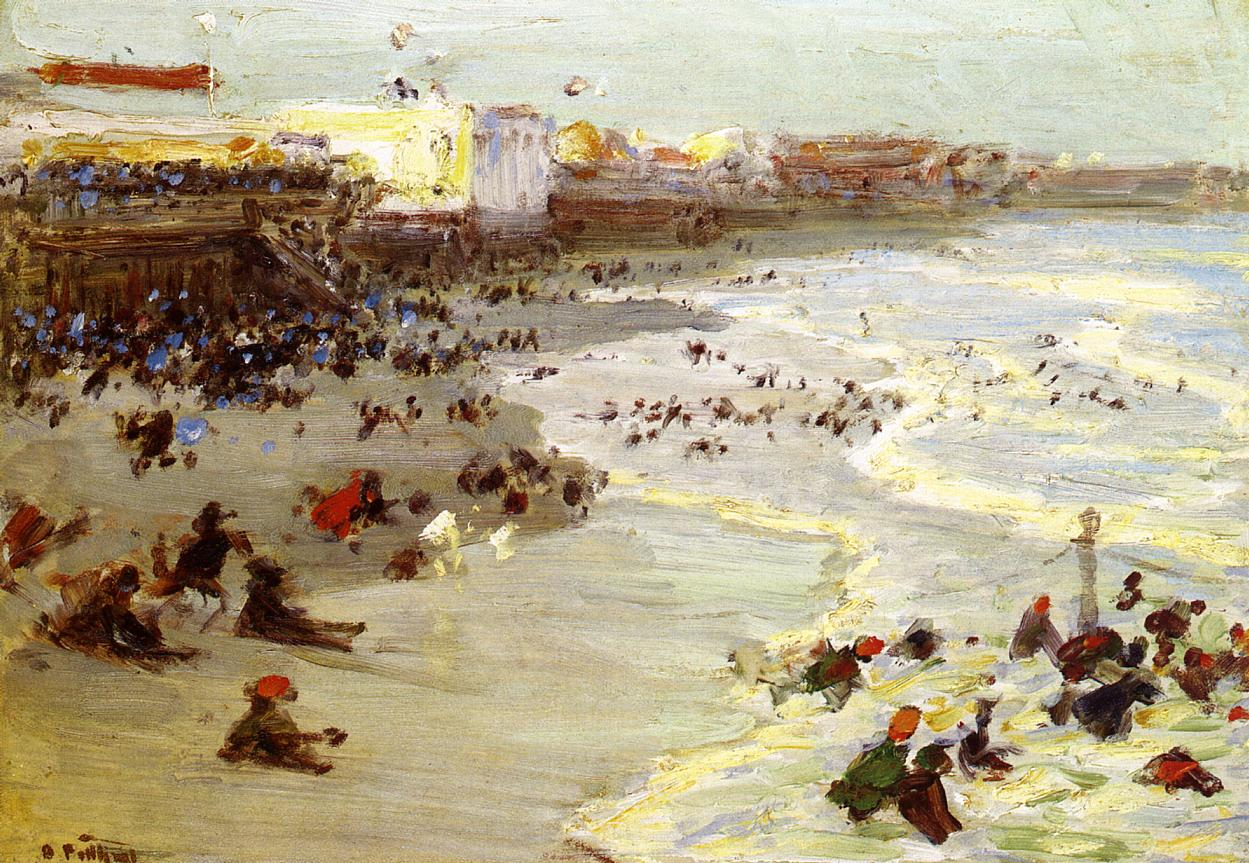
Coney Island, c. 1914, by Edward Henry Potthast

The first decade of the 20th century saw two more large amusement parks. Luna Park opened in 1903 on the site of Sea Lion Park, which had closed the previous year. The park contained a variety of attractions and exotic landscaping, lit by electricity at night; its flagship ride was A Trip to the Moon, an attraction based on Jules Verne's novel From the Earth to the Moon. The following year saw the opening of Dreamland, which reproduced many attractions at Luna Park, but at a grander scale, with a large central tower and lagoon, a sunken plaza, and one million electric lights. Additionally, the City of New York made efforts to condemn all buildings and piers built south of Surf Avenue in an effort to reclaim the beach and create a boardwalk, though the local amusement community opposed the move. Eventually, the city government and the community reached an agreement mandating that the beach did not begin until 1,000 feet (300 m) south of Surf Avenue and that the territory would be marked by a city-owned boardwalk. In return, the city would demolish any structures built upon public streets to reclaim beach access.

The original resorts lost patronage after horse racing in New York state was outlawed in 1909, but the amusement areas still saw significant patronage. In 1915, the Sea Beach Line was upgraded to a subway line, followed by the other former excursion roads, and the opening of the Stillwell Avenue station in 1919 ushered in Coney Island's busiest era. On the busiest summer days, over a million people would travel to Coney Island. This created tensions between longtime New York City residents and more recent immigrants who liked to patronize Coney Island. One of the entrepreneurs who took advantage of the increased visitor counts was Nathan Handwerker, who in 1916 started selling hot dogs at Coney Island for a nickel each, and eventually expanded his enterprise into the Nathan's Famous hot dog chain.

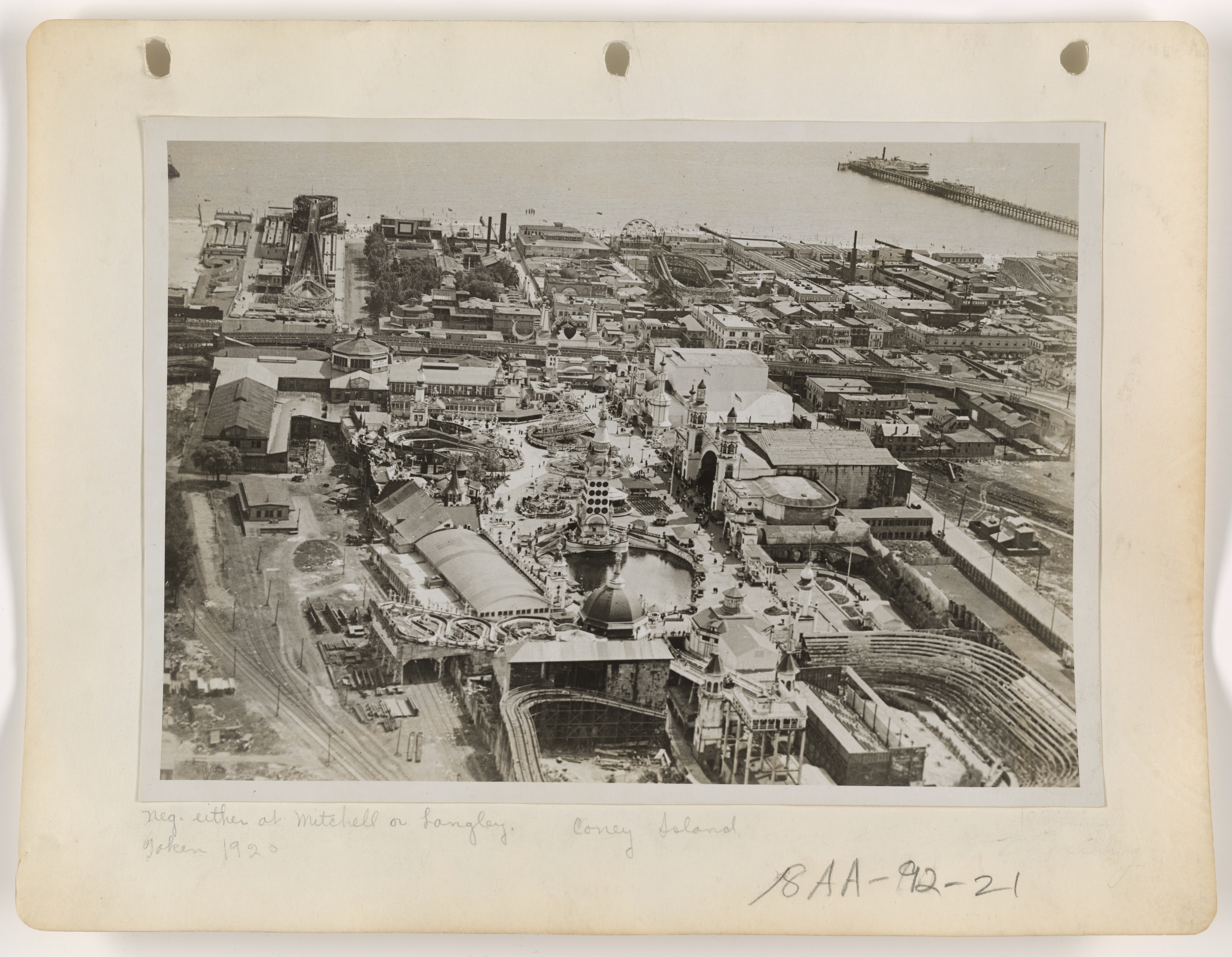
Coney Island in 1920

Coney Island's development as an amusement area continued through the end of World War II. The opening of the Wonder Wheel in 1920; the Riegelmann Boardwalk in 1923; the Shore Theater in 1925; several roller coasters in the 1920s including the Tornado, Thunderbolt, and Coney Island Cyclone; and the Parachute Jump in 1941 contributed to the area's quality as an amusement destination. In particular, the Riegelmann Boardwalk enabled the crowds to be dispersed away from Surf Avenue, the main west–east avenue in the area. Despite staff shortages during World War II, Coney Island retained its popularity and was frequented by military personnel.

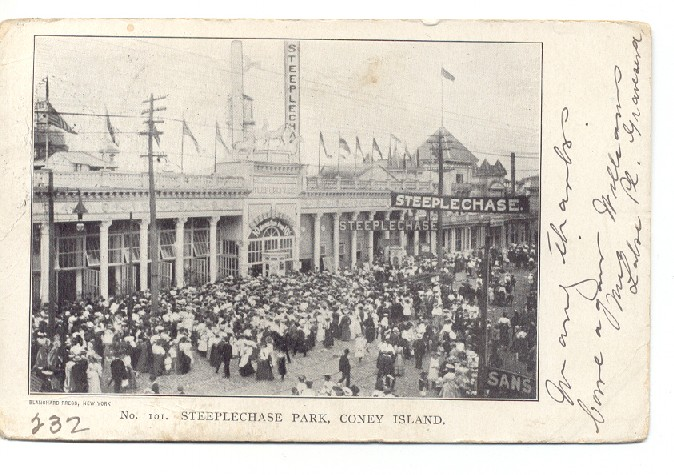
Steeplechase Park, 1905

The era was also marked by frequent fires, and those at the beginning of the 20th century were particularly destructive. A 1907 fire at Steeplechase Park resulted in the park having to be completely rebuilt. Dreamland burned down in 1911 and was never rebuilt. One of the largest conflagrations at Coney Island, which occurred in 1932, left at least a thousand people homeless.

The early 20th century additionally saw the infilling of a portion of the 3-mile-long (4.8 km) Coney Island Creek, thereby connecting Coney Island to the rest of Brooklyn. In the previous decades, there had been plans to dredge and straighten the creek as a ship canal, which were later abandoned. By 1924, local landowners and the city had filled a portion of the creek. A major section of the creek was further filled in to allow construction of the Belt Parkway in the 1930s, and the western and eastern ends of the island became peninsulas. More fill was added in 1962 during the construction of the Verrazzano–Narrows Bridge.

=== Residential development and decline ===
==== Robert Moses era ====
Coney Island, c. 1940

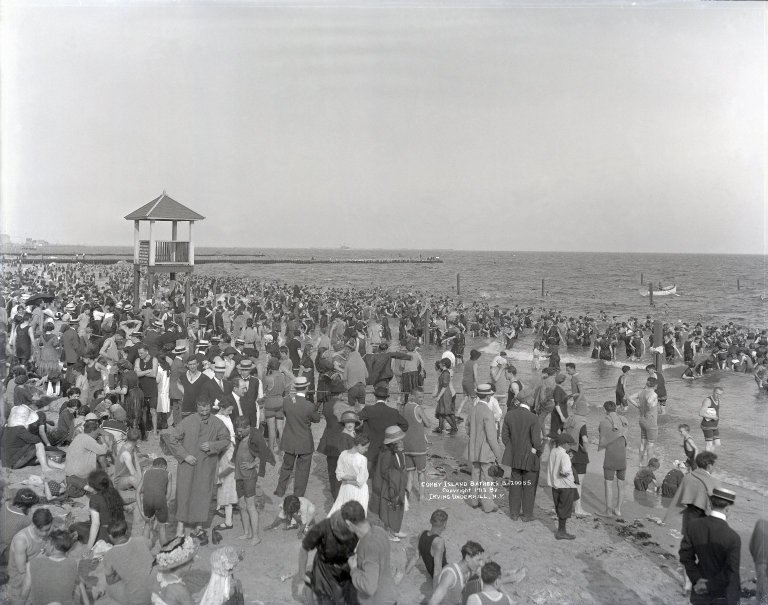
Bathers in Coney Island, by Irving Underhill, in the Brooklyn Museum collection

In 1937, New York City parks commissioner Robert Moses published a report about the possible redevelopment of Coney Island, which would have entailed the addition of parking lots and reconstruction of part of the boardwalk. The city purchased a 400-foot-wide (120 m) strip of land along the shoreline, which would allow the boardwalk to be moved 300 feet (91 m) inland. At this point, Coney Island was so crowded on summer weekends that, according to Moses, a coffin would provide more space per person. Though ride construction was delayed due to material shortages caused by the onset of World War II, two new rides were constructed in 1946 at the end of the war.

In August 1944, Luna Park was destroyed by a fire. Two years later, it was closed permanently and sold to a company who wanted to tear down the park's remnants and build Quonset huts for military veterans and their families. Moses asked the city to transfer Luna Park's land along the Coney Island waterfront to the Parks Department, a request that was granted in 1949. Moses then had the land rezoned for residential use, with plans to demolish "about a third" of attractions along Surf Avenue, one block north of the beach, and replace these with housing. Moses moved the boardwalk back from the beach several yards, demolishing many structures, including the city's municipal bath house, as well as several blocks of amusements. He claimed that fewer amusement-seekers were going to Coney Island every year, because they preferred places where they could bathe outdoors, such as Jones Beach State Park on Long Island, rather than the "mechanical gadget" attractions of Coney Island. Moses also announced that the Steeplechase Pier would be closed for a year so it could be renovated.

In 1953, Moses proposed that most of the peninsula be rezoned for various uses, claiming that it would be an "upgrade" over the various business and unrestricted zones that existed at the time. Steeplechase Park would be allowed to remain open, but much of the shorefront amusements and concessions would be replaced by residential developments. After many complaints from the public and from concession operators, the Estimate Board reinstated the area between West 22nd and West Eighth Streets as an amusement-only zone, with the zone extending 200 to 400 feet (61 to 122 m) inland from the shoreline. Moses's subsequent proposal to extend the Coney Island boardwalk east to Manhattan Beach was denied in 1955. A proposal to make the Quonset hut development into a permanent housing structure was also rejected.

A new building for the New York Aquarium was approved for construction in the neighborhood in 1953. Construction started on the aquarium in 1954. The development of the new New York Aquarium was expected to revitalize Coney Island. By 1955, the area still included four children's amusement areas, five roller coasters, several flat and dark rides, and various other attractions such as the Wonder Wheel. The New York Aquarium's new site opened in June 1957. At this point, there were still several dozen rides in Coney Island. A public housing project, Coney Island Houses, opened in the neighborhood that year.

==== Fred Trump era ====
During the summers of 1964 and 1965, there was a large decrease in the number of visitors to Coney Island because of the 1964/1965 World's Fair at Flushing Meadows–Corona Park in Queens. Crime increases, insufficient parking facilities, bad weather, and the post-World War II automotive boom were also cited as contributing factors in the visitor decrease. During the summer of 1964, concessionaires saw their lowest profits in a quarter-century. Ride operators reported that they had 30% to 90% fewer visitors in 1964 compared to the previous year.

A small amusement park called Astroland was announced for the boardwalk in 1962, to open the following year. Steeplechase Park, the last remaining large amusement park in Coney Island, closed permanently after the 1964 season. The surrounding blocks were filled with amusement rides and concessions that were closed or about to close. The rides at Steeplechase Park were auctioned off, and the property was sold to developer Fred Trump, who in 1965 announced that he wanted to build luxury apartments on the old Steeplechase property. At the time, residential developments in Coney Island in general were being built at a rapid rate. The peninsula, which had 34,000 residents in 1961, was expected to have more than double that number by the end of 1964. Many of the new residents moved into middle-income co-operative housing developments such as Trump Village, Warbasse Houses, and Luna Park Apartments; these replaced what The New York Times described as "a rundown sprawl of rickety houses". Developers were spending millions of dollars on new housing developments, and by 1966, the peninsula housed almost 100,000 people.

During 1966, developers tried to revitalize the Coney Island boardwalk as an amusement area. Trump destroyed Steeplechase Park's Pavilion of Fun during a highly publicized ceremony that September. In its stead, Trump proposed building a 160-foot-high (49 m) enclosed dome with recreational facilities and a convention center, a plan supported by Brooklyn borough president Abe Stark. The next month, the city announced its plans to acquire the 125 acres (51 ha) of the former Steeplechase Park, a move that many residents supported but that Trump considered to be "wasteful". In January 1968, New York City parks commissioner August Heckscher II proposed that the New York state government build an "open-space" state park on the Steeplechase site, and that May, the New York City Board of Estimate voted in favor of funding to buy the land from Trump. Condemnation of the site started in 1969. The city ultimately purchased the proposed park's site for $4 million, with a stipulation blocking Trump from developing the site as apartments.

Trump filed a series of court cases related to the proposed residential rezoning, and ultimately won a $1.3 million judgment. The Steeplechase Park site lay empty for several years. Trump started subleasing the property to Norman Kaufman, who ran a small collection of fairground amusements called "Steeplechase Park" on part of the site. The city also leased the boardwalk and parking lot sites at extremely low rates, which resulted in a $1 million loss of revenue over the following seven years. Since the city wanted to build the state park on the site of Kaufman's Steeplechase Park, it attempted to evict him by refusing to grant a lease extension.

==== Late-1970s attempts at restoration ====
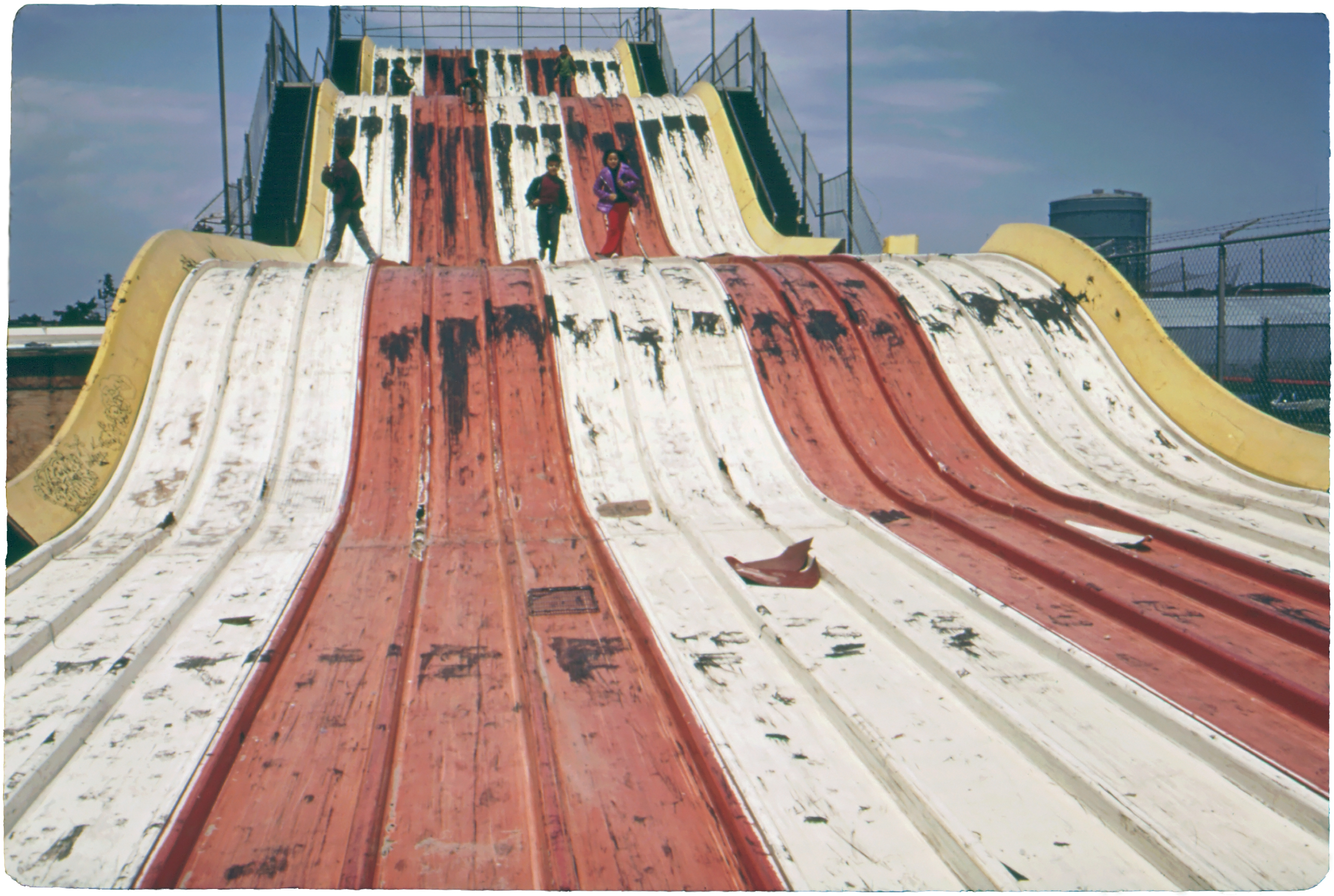
A 1973 photo of an abandoned "Giant Slide" that had been set up for a few years on the old Steeplechase site

The 1970s brought along further renewal plans, such as proposals to construct public housing, though the community was beset by social issues such as high crime and a drug epidemic. By 1975, the city was considering demolishing the Coney Island Cyclone in favor of an extension of the adjacent New York Aquarium. The proposed demolition was controversial, and after a refurbishment by Astroland, the Cyclone reopened for the summer 1975 season. The abandoned Parachute Jump was left in situ, and the New York City Board of Estimate planned to tear down the structure. In the meanwhile, Coney Island was still affected by a perception of crime and deterioration of old rides, but by the mid-1970s, middle-class families started returning to Coney Island following the implementation of a unified admission ticket to Coney Island's amusement areas.

The city continued to pursue litigation over the site occupied by Norman Kaufman, but for over a decade, was unsuccessful. It had no plan for the proposed state park, and in 1975 the United States Department of Housing and Urban Development nearly withdrew a proposed grant of $2 million to fund the proposed park. The city ultimately accepted the grant, though different city agencies still disagreed over whether to return the funds. Kaufman continued to operate the site until the end of summer 1980. The following June, the city paid Kaufman a million dollars for the rides, effectively evicting him, even though the amusements were estimated to be worth much less.

In 1979, the state announced that it would be conducting a report on the feasibility of legalizing gambling in New York State. Mayor Ed Koch proposed that the state open casinos in New York City to revitalize the area's economy. Residents and politicians supported the idea of building casinos at Coney Island, which they felt would alleviate its poverty, crime, and property vacancy rates. However, there was substantial controversy over the plans to place a gambling site in Coney Island. The state's interest in legalizing gambling had subsided by 1981, and the New York state legislature failed to take action on such proposal.

In an effort to reduce crime, the city also began demolishing abandoned bungalows in Coney Island. By 1982, the area was filled with vacant lots, though several residential developments were being planned for Coney Island. Having finally acquired Kaufman's rides, the New York City government began advertising for developers to redevelop the former amusement park area that November. The Mermaid-Neptune Development Corporation constructed three residential developments at the neighborhood's western edge, with a combined total of 430 units. These developments were completed through the mid-1980s. Even so, the area still suffered from drug-related killings and other crimes, especially west of West 20th Street. Former amusement structures such as the Parachute Jump lay unused, and prostitutes roamed around the neighborhood at night. Through the 1980s, prostitution and drug use in Coney Island increased, as did the area's murder and felony crime rate. By the late 1980s, deadly shootings were common, particularly in the low-income housing developments inside Coney Island. Commercial activity also decreased, and by 1990, storefronts on Mermaid Avenue had decreased by 90%, from over 400 stores before the urban renewal to 39 stores afterward.

=== 1980s and 1990s revival ===
==== Bullard plan and Sportsplex ====
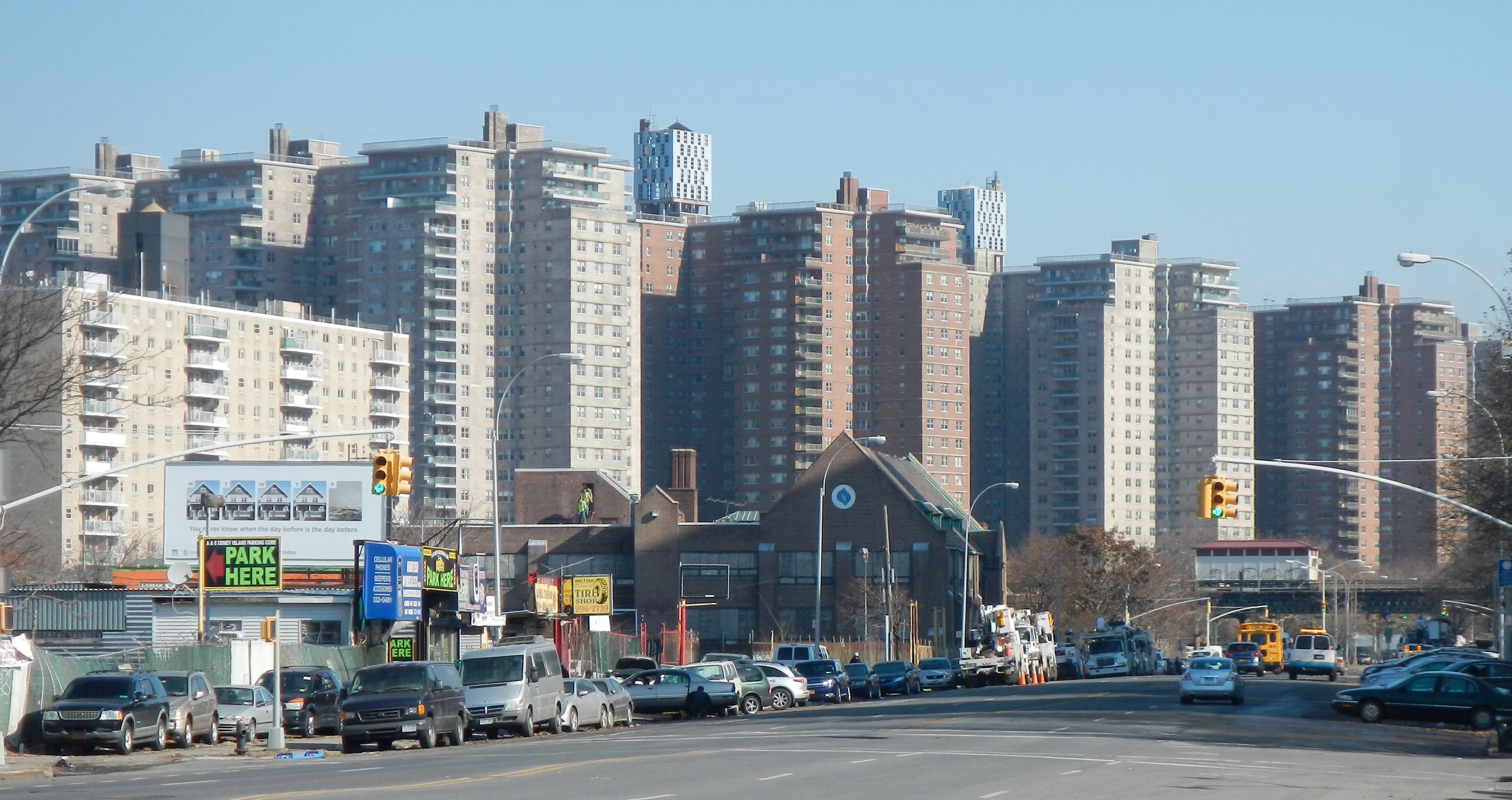
Co-ops in Coney Island

In the mid-1980s, restaurant mogul Horace Bullard proposed rebuilding Steeplechase Park. On the site bounded by West 15th and 19th Streets between Surf Avenue and the boardwalk, Bullard wanted to build a $55 million amusement park based on the originals. The city agreed, and the project was approved in 1985. Bullard planned to open the park by mid-1986 to coincide with the Statue of Liberty's centennial. However, the project was delayed while the New York City Planning Commission compiled an environmental impact report. By early 1987, the cost of the amusement park nearly doubled, to $100 million.

Concurrently, in December 1986, the New York State Urban Development Corporation formally proposed a 17,000-seat minor-league baseball stadium north of the boardwalk between West 19th and West 22nd Streets as well as 15,000-seat indoor arena north of the Abe Stark Rink. Negotiations were ongoing with the Mets and Yankees to ensure their support for the minor-league stadium. State senator Thomas Bartosiewicz attempted to block Bullard's plan, as he was part of a foundation that had promised another developer, Sportsplex, the right to build an amateur sports arena on the site. Construction was held up for another four years, and by 1989, Bullard and the city were ready to sign a contract that would allow the developer to construct a 60-ride amusement park on a 25-acre (10 ha) waterfront strip, which would be completed by 2002. Other proposals for the area included a $7.9 million restoration of the boardwalk, as well as a new high-school and college sports stadium.

Some of Coney Island's iconic rides were designated as official city landmarks during the late 1980s. In 1988, the Cyclone roller coaster was made a New York City designated landmark. This was followed by the Parachute Jump and the Wonder Wheel in 1989. The neighborhood's high crime rate had reversed slightly by the 1990s. However, Coney Island's relative isolation from the rest of New York City, along with its ethnic diversity, deprived the area of significant political power, and to a greater extent money.

==== Changes to plans ====
After Rudy Giuliani took office as New York City mayor in 1994, he negated the Bullard deal by approving the construction of a minor-league baseball stadium on the site allotted for Steeplechase Park. Giuliani had wanted to build Sportsplex in order to improve sports facilities in the area, and to create a professional baseball team in Brooklyn. By the late 1990s, some $67 million had been secured for the development of Sportsplex. In 1997, developer Bruce Ratner proposed constructing a $100 million entertainment complex between West 9th and West 15th Streets, with a "virtual-reality amusement park" as well as a movie theater multiplex. Concurrently, a four-phase, 873-unit housing development in Coney Island was completed in 1996.

In 1998, Giuliani canceled Sportsplex and the entertainment complex, and instead unveiled another plan where only the parking lot would be built. The Sports Foundation had prepared another proposal that would allow a scaled-down Sportsplex to be built next to the minor-league baseball stadium. The minor league team was called the Brooklyn Cyclones, though naming rights to the stadium were sold to Keyspan Energy. Bullard, now no longer rebuilding Steeplechase Park, had wanted to restore the Thunderbolt as part of a scaled-down amusement park, but it was demolished instead. In 2000, the city approved the $31 million project to construct Keyspan Park using the funds from the canceled Sportsplex, and the minor-league baseball stadium opened the following year. Other major projects at the time included the reconstruction of Coney Island's sewers and the refurbishment of the Stillwell Avenue subway station, the latter of which was completed in 2005.

=== 2000s and 2010s ===
==== Thor Equities ownership and rezoning proposals ====
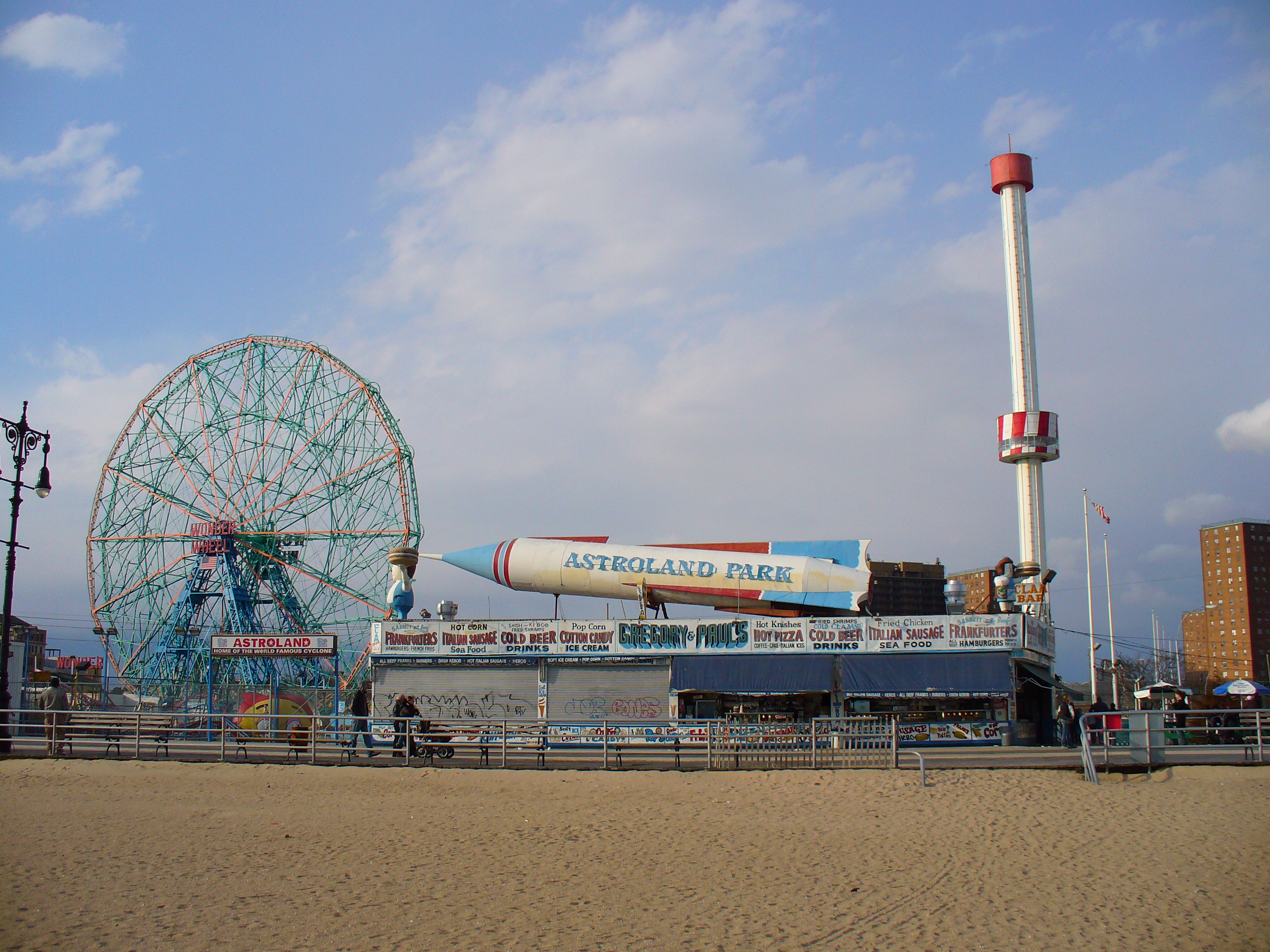
The Wonder Wheel and Astroland Park from a Coney Island beach

In 2003, Mayor Michael Bloomberg took an interest in revitalizing Coney Island as a possible site for the New York City bid of the 2012 Summer Olympics. A plan was developed by the Astella Development Corporation. When the city lost the Olympic bid, the plans were passed to the Coney Island Development Corporation (CIDC), which made modified plans. Shortly before the CIDC's plans were to be publicly released, a development company named Thor Equities purchased all of Bullard's 168,000-square-foot (15,600 m^{2}) western property for $13 million, later selling the property to Taconic Investment Partners for over $90 million. Taconic now had 100 acres (40 ha), on which it planned to build 2,000 apartment units. Thor then went about using much of its $77 million profit to purchase property on Stillwell Avenue for well over market value, and offered to buy out every piece of property inside the traditional amusement area.

In September 2005, Thor's founder, Joe Sitt, unveiled his new plans for a large Bellagio-style hotel resort with a timeshare development, surrounded by rides and amusements. The CIDC report suggested adding year-round commercial and amusement area, and recommended that property north of Surf Avenue and west of Abe Stark Rink could be rezoned for other uses, including residential. Sitt, a resident of the area, spent more than $100 million to buy land in Coney Island. Astroland owner Carol Hill Albert, whose husband's family had owned the park since its 1962 opening, sold the site to Thor in November 2006. Two months later, Thor released renderings for a $1.5 billion amusement park, entertainment complex, and indoor water park called Coney Island Park.

In 2007, the DCP started circulating a rezoning plan that would cover 47 acres (19 ha) of Coney Island. The city would spend $120 million to redevelop 15 acres (6.1 ha) into an amusement park surrounded by around 5,000 new housing units. The Aquarium was also planning a renovation in conjunction with the rezoning. The city's and Sitt's proposals directly conflicted: Sitt wanted to build housing inside the amusement park, while the city's rezoning would create a special amusement district where residential development was forbidden. In April 2008, because of objections from land owners, residents, and developers, the city revised its rezoning proposal. Only 9 acres would be used as an amusement park, while private owners and developers could build on the rest of the land as long as they followed the DCP's general master plan. While the city negotiated with Thor, Sitt evicted several amusement operators on his land, including Astroland, in the expectation that he would soon be able to redevelop it.

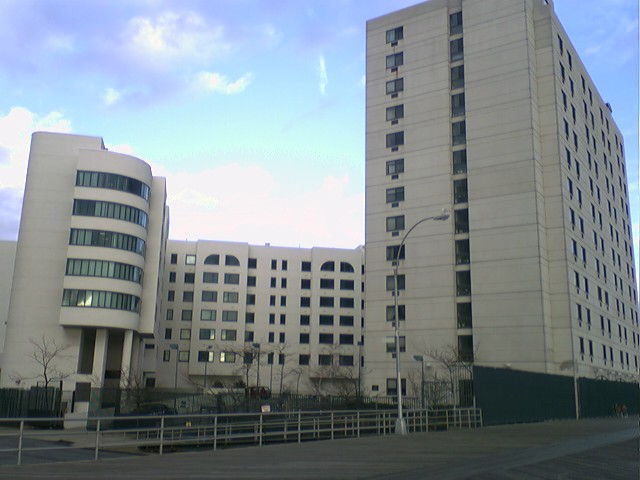
Senior housing in Coney Island

The DCP certified the rezoning plan in January 2009, which allowed the city to create a 9.4-acre (3.8 ha) amusement district. At the time, Thor Equities said it hoped to complete the project by 2011. In June 2009, the city's planning commission approved the construction of 4,500 units of housing, including 900 affordable units, and promised to preserve affordable housing already in the neighborhood. Subsequently, the city government paid Sitt $95.6 million for 7 acres (2.8 ha) of land. The nonprofit civic group Municipal Art Society wanted the city-operated park to be larger, though the city was reluctant to spend so much money.

==== New attractions ====
The Zipper and Spider on West 12th Street were closed permanently and dismantled in 2006. The next year, plans to restore Coney Island's historic B&B Carousell were revealed. After Astroland closed in 2008, it was replaced by a new Dreamland in 2009 and by a new Luna Park in 2010. In April 2011, the first new roller coasters to be built at Coney Island in eighty years were opened as part of efforts to reverse the decline of the amusement area. The B&B Carousell reopened in 2013 at Luna Park. The Thunderbolt steel roller coaster, named after the original wooden coaster on the site, was opened in June 2014. Furthermore, a live performance venue, the Ford Amphitheater at Coney Island, opened on the boardwalk in 2016.

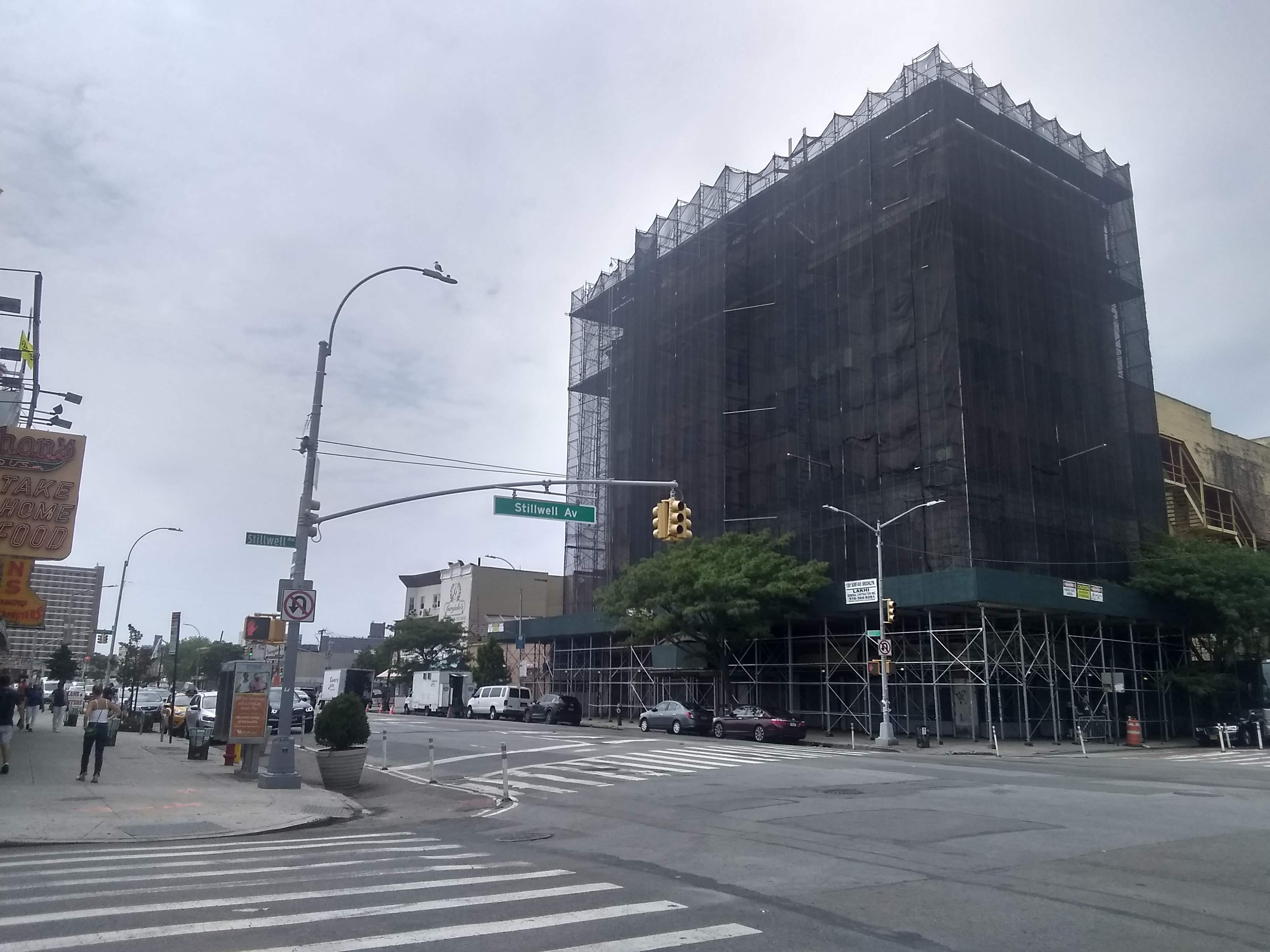
Conversion of the Shore Theater into a hotel, seen in 2019

In 2012, Hurricane Sandy caused major damage to the Coney Island amusement parks, the Aquarium, and businesses. Despite this, the Nathan's Hot Dog Eating Contest was held the following summer, as usual. Luna Park at Coney Island reopened as scheduled on March 24, 2013. Rebuilding of the aquarium started in early 2013, and a major expansion of the aquarium opened in 2018. That August, the NYCEDC and NYC Parks announced that Luna Park would be expanded between West 15th and West 16th Streets, next to the Thunderbolt. There would be three public plazas and an amusement arcade within the newly expanded amusement area. The same month, it was also announced that a 50-room boutique hotel was being planned for Coney Island within the former Shore Theater on Surf and Stillwell Avenues. The city also expressed its intent to demolish the Abe Stark Rink and redevelop the site, as per the 2009 rezoning, though residents wanted NYC Parks to retain control over the site rather than sell it off to a private developer.

=== 2020s to present ===
Many of these construction projects were placed on hold in 2020 with the COVID-19 pandemic in New York City. That year, the businesses and amusement parks at Coney Island either operated in a sharply reduced capacity or did not open at all. The parks reopened for the 2021 season, and Luna Park's expansion commenced in October 2021. The addition of new amusements coincided with the development of over 2,000 new residential units on empty lots through the early 2020s. These included a 1,000-unit mega-development and a three-tower, 499-unit mixed-use complex. The new housing units were built despite the fact that the neighborhood was among the areas in New York City that were most vulnerable to flooding due to increases in sea levels. By 2023, half a dozen apartment buildings had been or were being built along Surf Avenue.

In February 2025, the city government announced plans for the Coney Island West project, which would include 1,500 housing units on the peninsula's western end, as well as upgrades to the Stark Rink and the Riegelmann Boardwalk's western section. The city government announced plans that June for an additional 1,100 housing units in Coney Island, and the city pledged $1 billion that December to fund the development, including 1,500 residences. The city government established a business improvement district for Coney Island in early 2026.

==== The Coney casino proposal ====
The Coney
- Interactive map of The Coney
- Location: Brooklyn, New York, United States
- Opened: cancelled
- No. of rooms: 500
- Casino type: Resort
- Operating license holder: Saratoga Casino Holdings LLC

In November 2022, Sitt proposed constructing a casino at Coney Island to attract tourists. This proposal followed an announcement by New York state officials in April 2022 that they would issue three casino licenses in Downstate New York. Although the nearby Brooklyn Community Board 11 voted in early 2024 to allow Coney Island to be rezoned for casino use, some residents opposed the planned casino, which would be known as the Coney. Thor Equities, Legends Hospitality, Saratoga Casino Holdings, and the Chickasaw Nation would be the developers. If the Coney were built, the structure would include a 32-story hotel with 500 rooms, 90,000 square feet (8,400 m^{2}) of convention space, 70,000 square feet (6,500 m^{2}) of retail and dining space, and a 2,500-seat concert venue. The developers of the project submitted their bid for a commercial casino license on June 27, 2025. Shortly after the submission, the city council approved the necessary zoning changes for the resort, which included eliminating part of Bowery Street. On September 29, 2025, the community advisory committee voted 4–2 to reject the casino proposal, effectively ending the plan.

=== Oral history archive ===
In 2004, the Coney Island History Project began collecting stories of Coney Island from longtime residents. The CIHP records, archives, and shares oral history interviews about Coney Island. The organizations conducts interviews in English, Russian, Chinese, and Spanish. During the COVID-19 pandemic, the CIHP continued to record interviews via phone or Skype. As of 2020 over 370 interviews were available online via the Coney Island History Project Oral History Archive.

=== Housing developments ===
Coney Island also has significant concentrations of NYCHA, Mitchell–Lama, and LIHTC housing developments. These include Coney Island Houses, a NYCHA development. Trump Village was part of the Mitchell–Lama affordable housing program prior to 2007.

== Amusement parks and attractions ==
Coney Island has two amusement parks, Luna Park and Deno's Wonder Wheel Amusement Park, as well as several rides that are not incorporated into either amusement park. These are owned and managed by several different companies and operate independently of each other. Coney Island also has several other visitor attractions such as skeeball and ball tossing, as well as a sideshow, that contains shooting, throwing, and tossing skills. The area hosts renowned events as well. Coney Island's amusement area is one of a few in the United States that is not mostly owned by any one entity.

=== Rides ===
==== Current rides ====
Coney Island contains three rides with landmark status. One is a New York City designated landmark, another is listed in the National Register of Historic Places (NRHP), and a third is both a city landmark and a NRHP-listed landmark.

The Wonder Wheel, opened in 1920, is a steel Ferris wheel with both stationary cars and rocking cars that slide along a track. It holds 144 riders, stands 150 ft (46 m) tall, weighs over 200 short tons (180 long tons; 180 t), and is located at Deno's Wonder Wheel Amusement Park. The Wonder Wheel was made a city landmark in 1989.

The B&B Carousell (as spelled by the frame's builder, William F. Mangels) is Coney Island's last traditional carousel, near the old entrance to Luna Park. The carousel was built circa 1906–1909 with a traditional roll-operated fairground organ. It was relocated multiple times, most recently to Luna Park's Steeplechase Plaza in 2013, and listed on the National Register of Historic Places in 2016.

The Coney Island Cyclone, opened in 1927, is one of the United States' oldest wooden roller coasters still in operation. The Cyclone includes an 85 ft (26 m), 58-degree drop. It is owned by the City of New York, and is operated by Luna Park under a franchise agreement. The Cyclone was made a city landmark in 1988 and was listed on the NRHP in 1991. The Cyclone is New York City's only remaining wooden coaster and is considered "irreplaceable", since timber-supported coasters can no longer be built under modern city building codes.

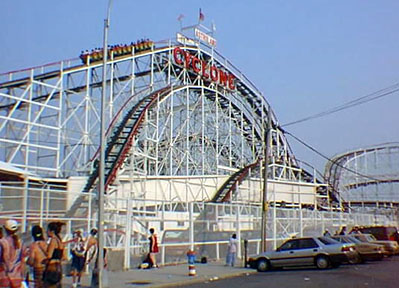
Coney Island Cyclone

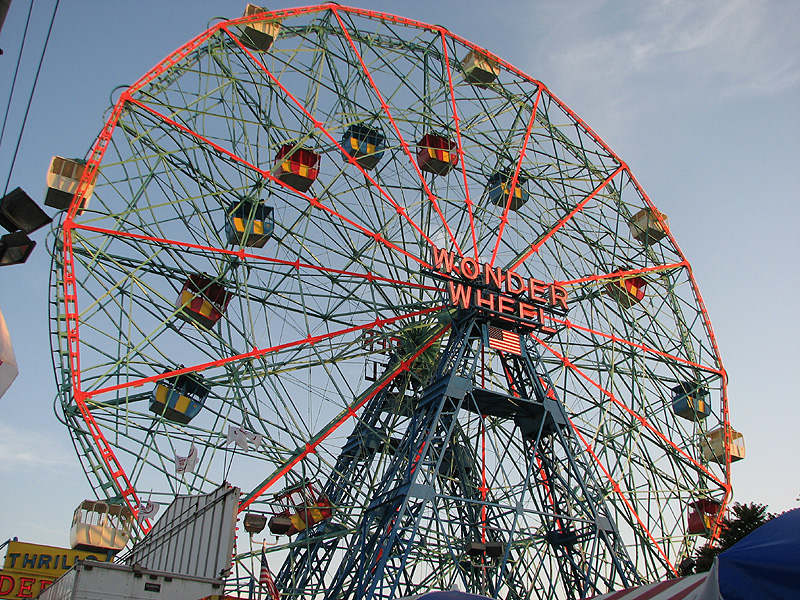
Wonder Wheel

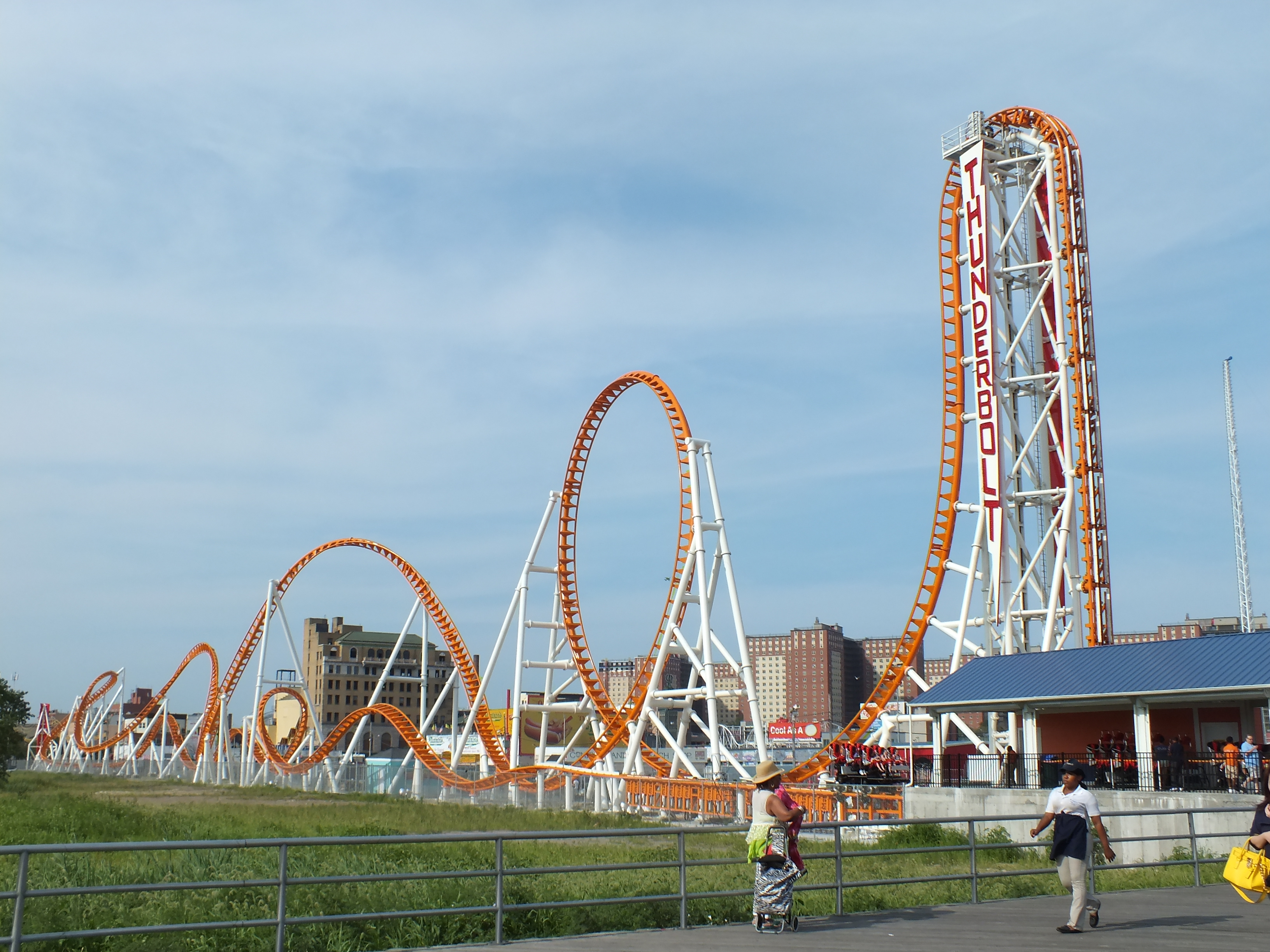
Thunderbolt

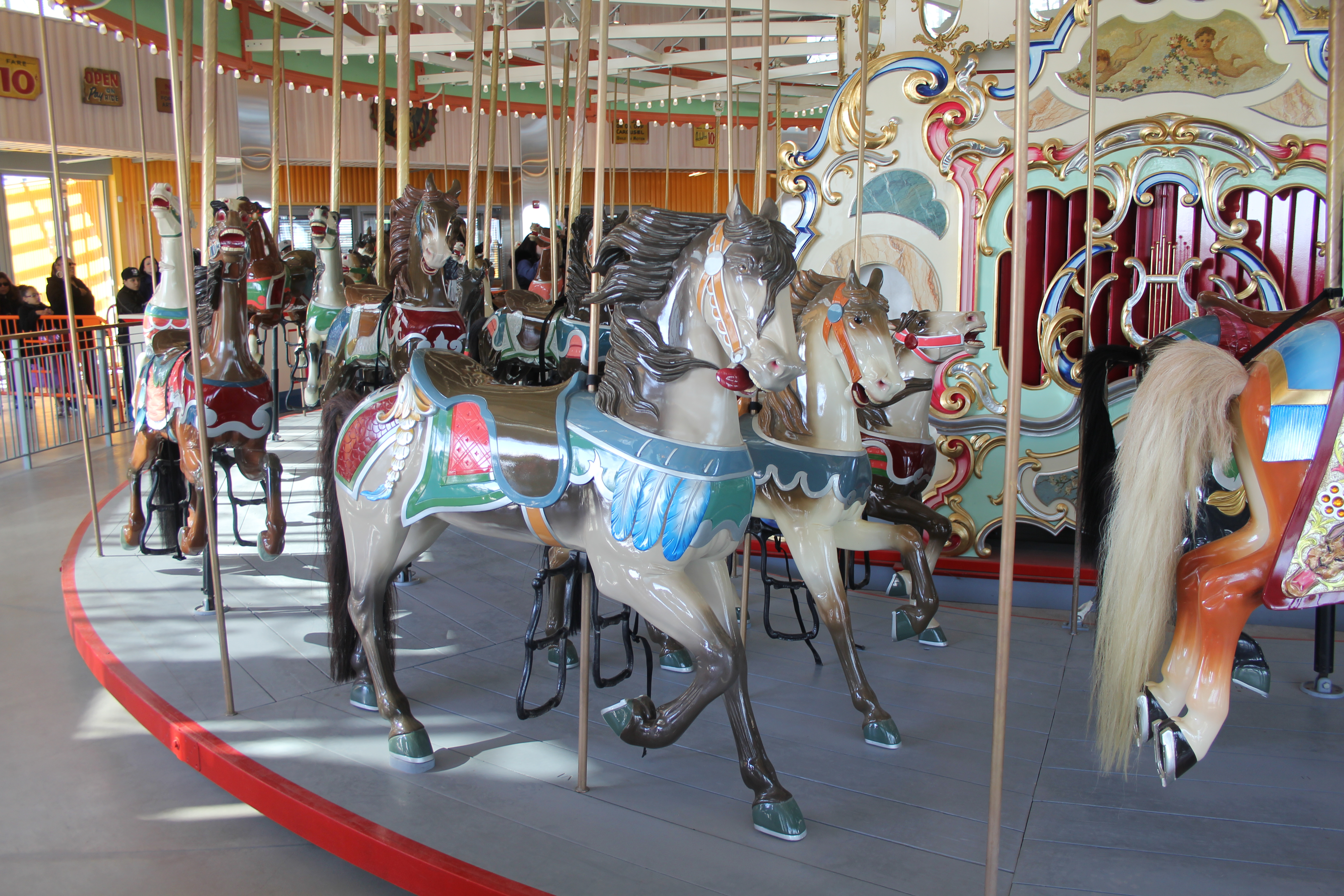
B&B Carousell

There are also multiple other rides in Coney Island. In March 2014, construction started on the new Thunderbolt, a steel roller coaster that was manufactured by Zamperla at a cost of $10 million. The ride features 2,000 feet (610 m) of track, a height of 125 feet (38 m), and a top speed of 65 miles per hour (105 km/h), as well as four inversions. The Thunderbolt opened in June 2014. Several bumper car rides in Coney Island are all operated separately. As of 2019, these include an attraction in Deno's Wonder Wheel Park, as well as Eldorado Auto Skooter on Surf Avenue. Historically, the earliest bumper car rides were located in Coney Island. Furthermore, two traditional dark ride haunted houses operate at Coney Island: Spook-a-Rama at Deno's, and Ghost Hole on West 12th Street adjacent to Deno's.

==== Former rides ====
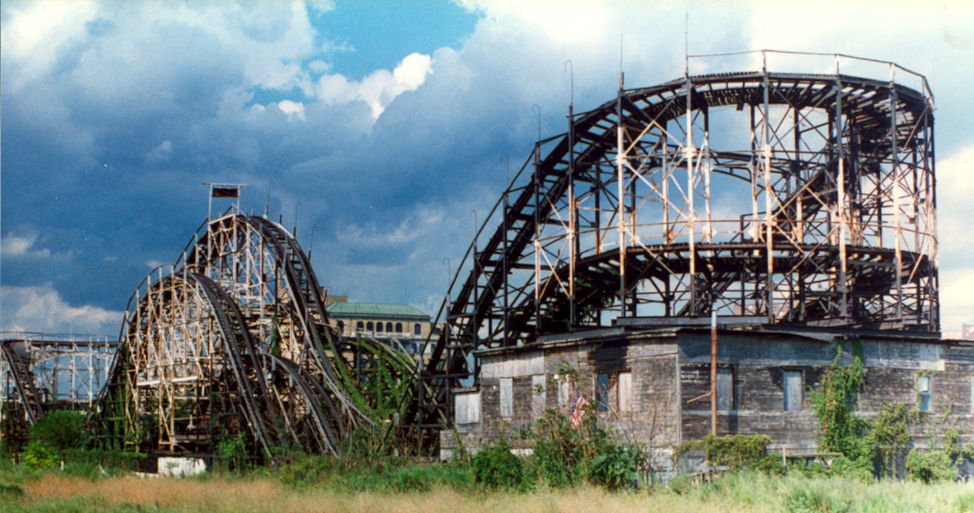
The original Thunderbolt in 1995

Coney Island has had three major amusement parks in its past—Steeplechase Park (1897–1964), Luna Park (1903–1944), and Dreamland (1904–1911)—as well as several standalone attractions. In addition, Astroland operated at the site of the current Luna Park from 1962 to 2008, while a second Dreamland operated at that site for only the 2009 season.

In addition to the rides in Coney Island's former amusement parks, there were also several dozen roller coasters that are now defunct. The Comet, next to the Cyclone's current site, was built in 1921 and destroyed in 1945. Another coaster, the Oriental Scenic Railway, was created by LaMarcus Adna Thompson in 1887, and was demolished in 1955 to be replaced with a "hot rod" amusement ride. The steeplechase roller coaster, created by Steeplechase Park operator George C. Tilyou in 1897, consisted of people riding wooden horses around the park on a steel track. The original wooden Thunderbolt coaster, located between West 15th and West 16th Streets, was constructed in 1925, closed in 1983, and torn down in 2000 during the construction of nearby Keyspan Park. Nearby was Tornado, a wooden coaster constructed in 1926, and destroyed by arson in 1977.

Coney Island also contains one defunct ride that is still standing, the Parachute Jump. Originally built as the Life Savers Parachute Jump at the 1939 New York World's Fair, this was the first ride of its kind. Patrons were hoisted 262 ft (80 m) in the air before being allowed to drop using guy-wired parachutes. The Parachute Jump was closed in the 1960s, but was officially preserved, having been listed on the NRHP in 1980 and made a city landmark in 1989.

=== Beaches ===
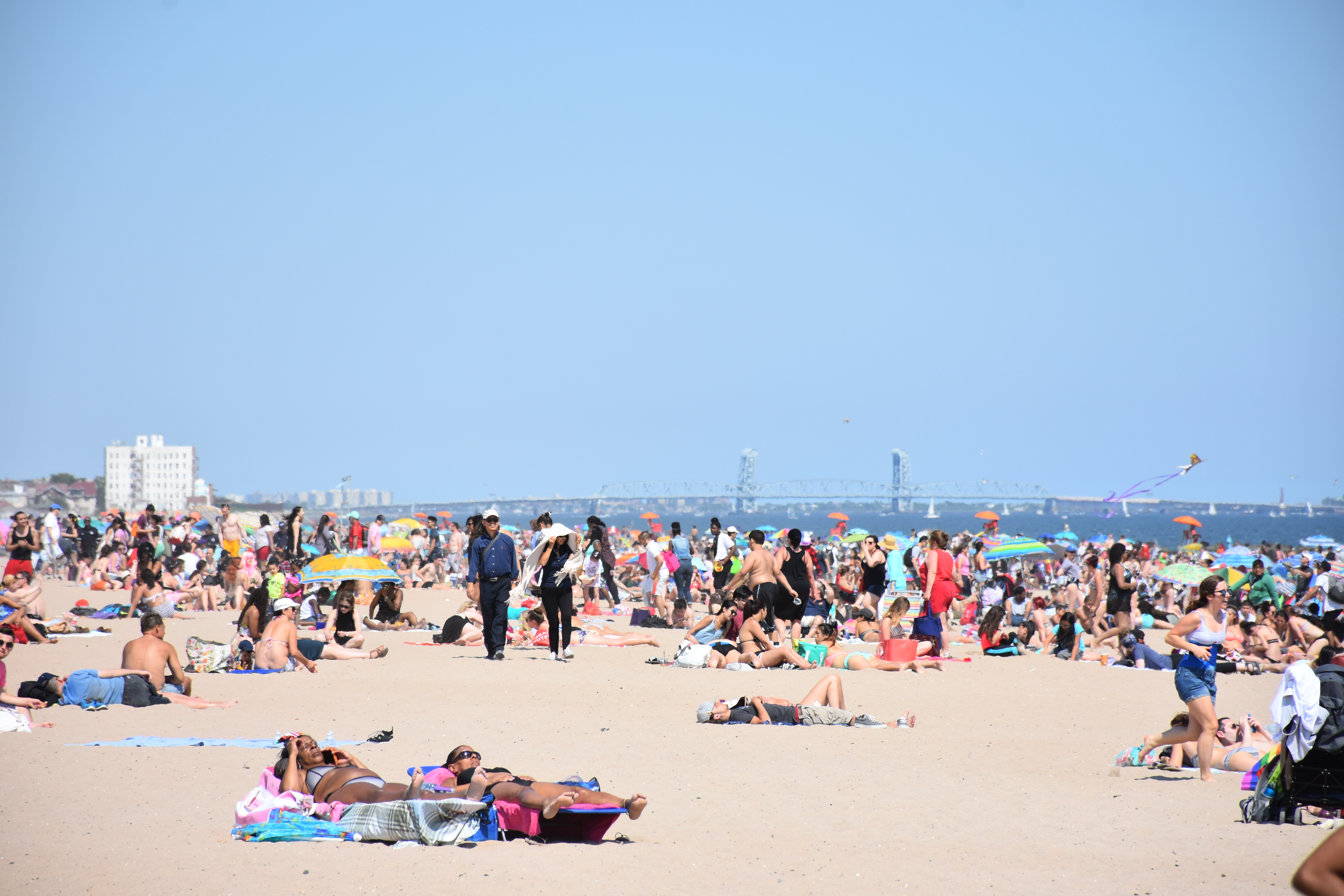
The beach at Coney Island in June 2016, with the Marine Parkway–Gil Hodges Memorial Bridge visible on the horizon

There is a broad public sand beach that starts at Sea Gate at West 37th Street, through the central Coney Island area and Brighton Beach, to the beginning of the community of Manhattan Beach, a distance of approximately 2.7 mi (4.3 km). The beach is continuous and is served for its entire length by the broad Riegelmann Boardwalk. Numerous amusements, as well as the aquarium and a variety of food shops and arcades, are directly accessible from the landward side of the boardwalk. The boardwalk in Manhattan Beach, located within Manhattan Beach Park, is not connected with the Riegelmann Boardwalk.

The beaches in Coney Island used to be private until 1923 when the city bought all the land on the waterfront and created the Riegelmann Boardwalk and Beach. Today, only the sand beach inside Sea Gate is private; it is accessible solely to residents of that community.

The public beaches are maintained on a regular basis by the city. Because sand no longer naturally deposits on the beach, it is replenished in regular beach nourishment projects using dredged sand. The public beaches are open and free to use, though the boardwalk is closed during nights from 1 to 5 a.m. The beach area is divided into several sections by rock groynes that were built in the 1920s to prevent erosion.

There are several clubs that host activities on Coney Island's beach. The Coney Island Polar Bear Club consists of a group of people who swim at Coney Island throughout the winter months. Their most popular event is an annual swim on New Year's Day. The beach also serves as the training grounds for the Coney Island Brighton Beach Open Water Swimmers, a group dedicated to promoting open water swimming, which hosts several open water swim races each year.

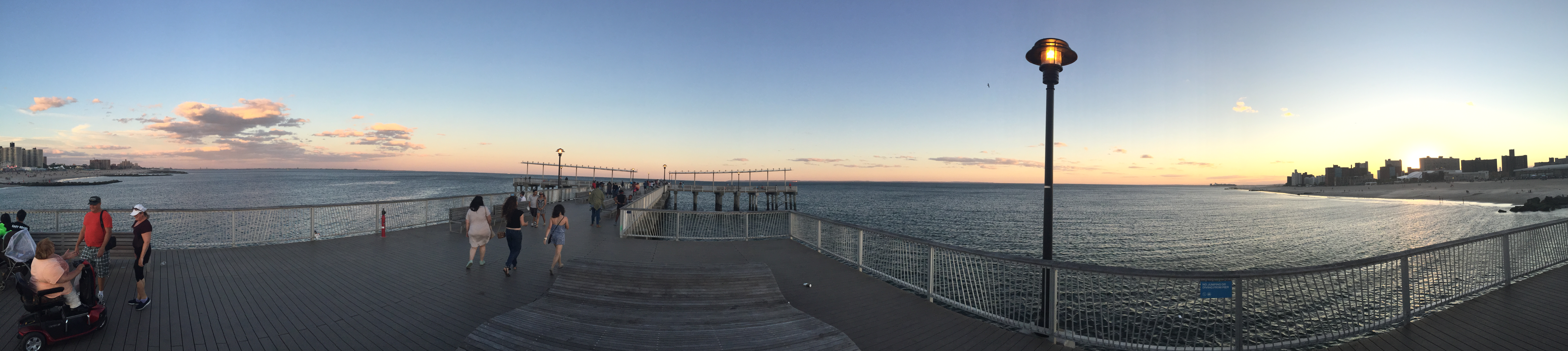
The boardwalk around sunset

=== Public parks ===
There are several public parks in Coney Island, operated by the New York City Department of Parks and Recreation. Parks within the main Coney Island neighborhood include:

- The Abe Stark Skating Rink, located on the south side of Surf Avenue between West 19th and West 20th Streets, adjacent to the boardwalk. It opened in 1970.
- Coney Island Creek Park, located along the south shore of Coney Island Creek. Opened in 1984, it is composed mostly of plants.
- Leon S. Kaiser Park, located on the northern side of Neptune Avenue between West 24th and West 32nd Streets, and contains playgrounds, athletic facilities, fitness equipment, and open spaces for barbecuing.
- Poseidon Playground, located along the beach between West 25th and West 27th Streets, and contains water spray showers, playgrounds, and handball courts.
- Steeplechase Park, located along the beach between West 16th and West 19th Streets. It contains a public plaza with seating, as well as MCU Park, a minor league baseball stadium.
- Surf Playground, located on the south side of Surf Avenue between West 25th and West 27th Streets, just north of Poseidon Playground. It contains basketball courts, playgrounds, and water spray showers.

=== Other attractions ===
The New York Aquarium opened in 1957 on the former site of the Dreamland amusement park. It is located on 602 Surf Avenue between West 5th and West 10th Streets. As of 2018, the New York Aquarium consists of five exhibits: Aquatheater; Conservation Hall; Sea Cliffs; Sharks, Rays & Turtles; and Ocean Wonders: Sharks. The original Bathysphere, a deep-sea submersible that made historic journeys underwater in the 1930s, is on display at the aquarium.

Maimonides Park is located on the former site of Steeplechase Park. Opened in 2001 as KeySpan Park, it hosts the Brooklyn Cyclones minor league baseball team. In 2010, it was renamed after the Municipal Credit Union (MCU), the city's largest credit union, in an eleven-year naming rights deal which ended in 2021.

In June 2016, the Ford Amphitheater at Coney Island opened on the boardwalk to the west of Maimondies Park, hosting several live musical acts as well as other events. It was constructed at the location of the Childs Restaurant, which was originally constructed in 1923 and was renovated when the amphitheater was being constructed. The rooftop part of the restaurant reopened in July 2016.

The nonprofit organization Coney Island USA also operates the Coney Island Museum, a collection of memorabilia that chronicles the history of the neighborhood. The museum opened in 1980, and is located at 1208 Surf Avenue near the intersection with West 12th Street. It charges a $5 admission fee per adult. Another nonprofit founded in 2004, the Coney Island History Project, operates a space near the Wonder Wheel.

=== Events ===
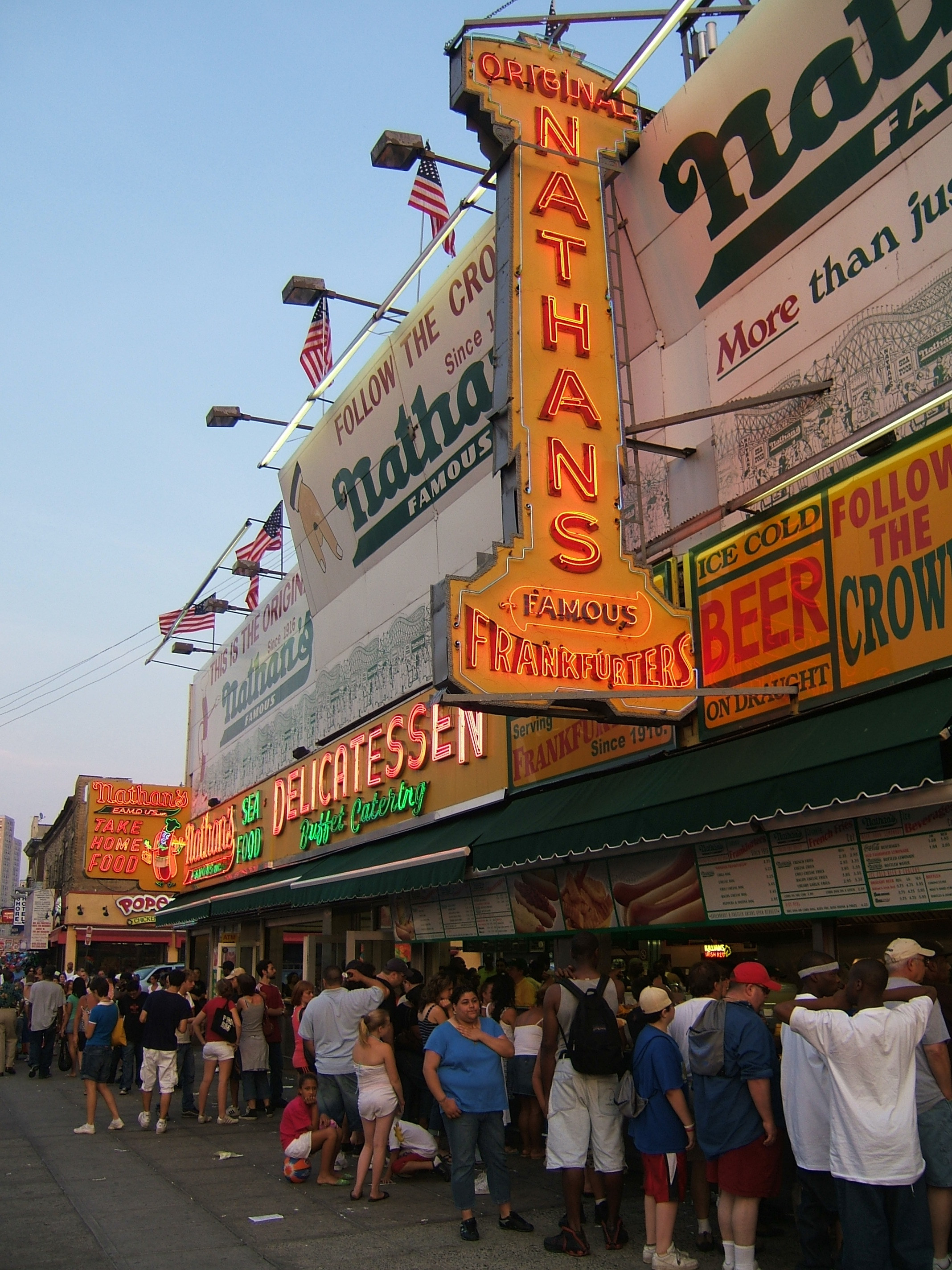
Nathan's Famous

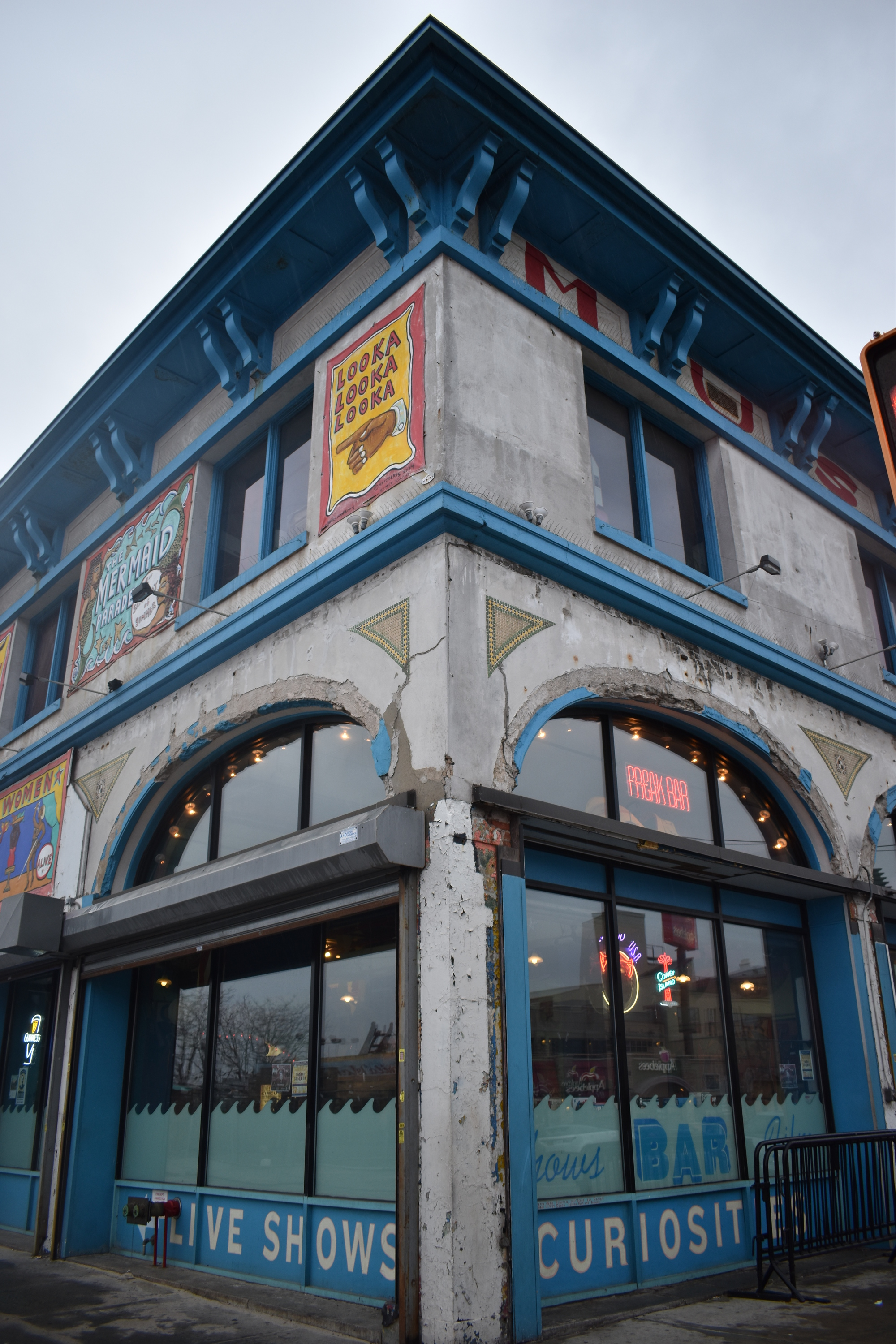
The Freak Bar

Coney Island USA sponsors various seasonal acts every year. In April, the organization hosts the Noisefest and the Congress of Curious Peoples. This is followed in May or June by the Coney Island Mermaid Parade, which takes place on Surf Avenue and the boardwalk, and features floats and performances. During August or September, Coney Island USA produces the Beard and Moustache Competition; Tattoo and Motorcycle Festival; and Coney Island Film Festival. The organization then hosts the Creepshow at the Freakshow, an interactive Halloween-themed event, in October.

The annual Cosme 5K Charity Run/Walk, supported by the Coney Island Sports Foundation, takes place on the Riegelmann Boardwalk toward the end of June.

A major national volleyball tournament hosted by the Association of Volleyball Professionals (AVP), which is typically hosted on the West Coast of the U.S., was held in Coney Island starting in 2006. The AVP built a 4,000-seat stadium and twelve outer courts next to the boardwalk for the event. When AVP tournaments resumed in Brooklyn in 2015, they were hosted at Brooklyn Bridge Park instead.

In 2009, the Ringling Bros. and Barnum & Bailey Circus performed in Coney Island for the first time since 1956. The event, titled The Coney Island Boom-A-Ring, was housed in tents that were located between the boardwalk and Surf Avenue. The following year, they returned to the same location with The Coney Island Illuscination.

In May 2015, Thor Equities unveiled Coney Art Walls, a public art wall project curated by former Museum of Contemporary Art, Los Angeles, director Jeffrey Deitch and Thor CEO Joe Sitt. Located at 3050 Stillwell Avenue, the project featured work from more than 30 artists. The exhibition started being held annually through at least 2019.

From 2001 to 2010, The Village Voice held the annual Siren Music Festival on Coney Island. The event featured mostly indie rock and hip-hop acts like M.I.A., Beach House, TV on the Radio, and Modest Mouse.

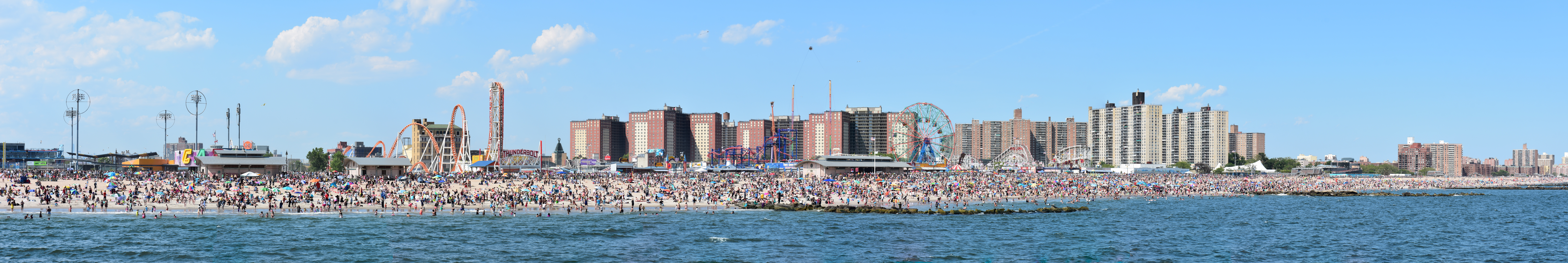
Panorama of Coney Island waterfront as seen from the pier in June 2016

== Demographics ==
=== 2010s ===
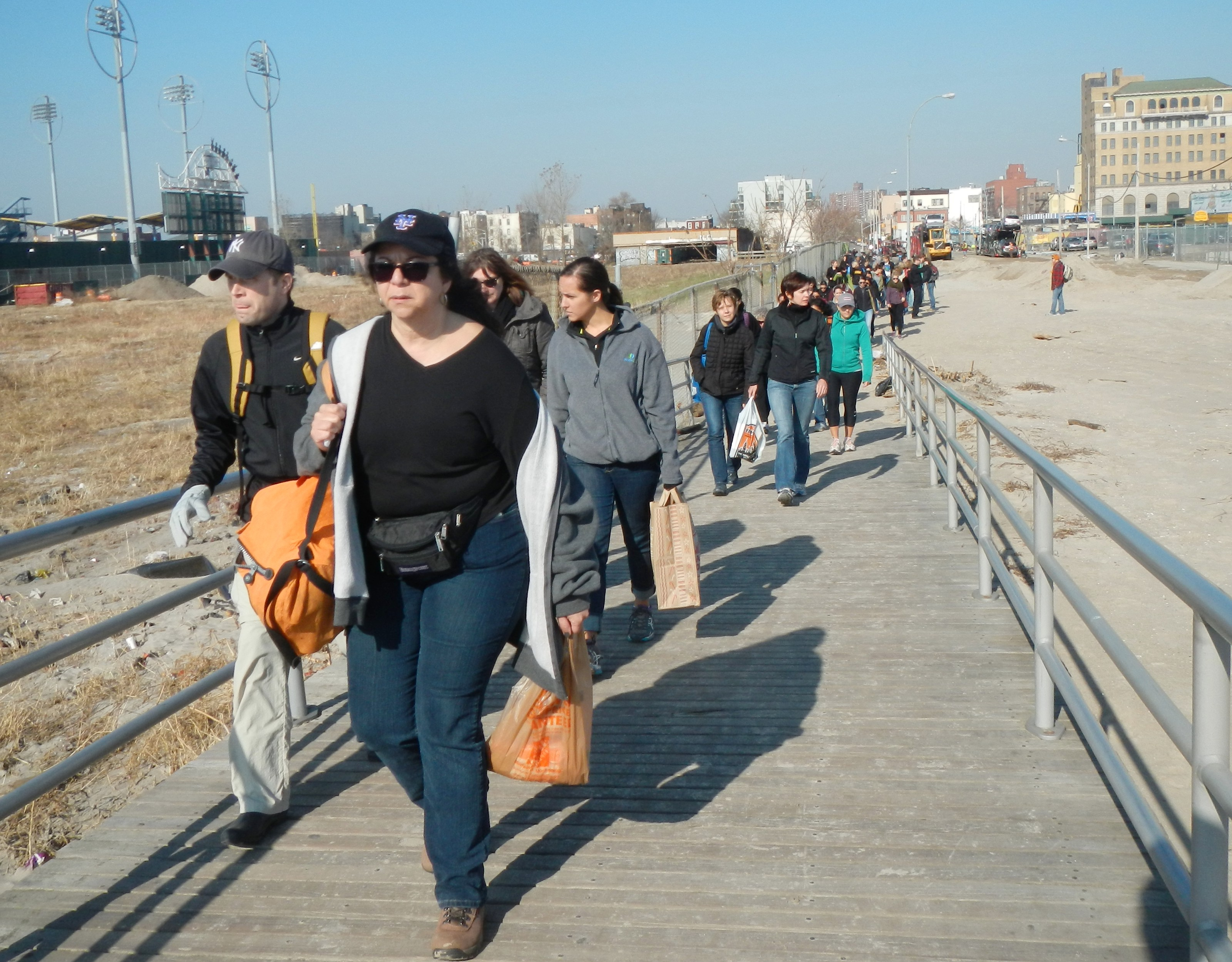
Volunteers arrive to clear the boardwalk after Hurricane Sandy.

Based on data from the 2010 United States census, the combined population of Coney Island and Sea Gate was 31,965, a decrease of 2,302 (6.7%) from the 34,267 counted in 2000. Covering an area of 851.49 acres (344.59 ha), the neighborhood had a population density of 37.5 inhabitants per acre (24,000/sq mi; 9,300/km^{2}).

The racial makeup of the neighborhood was 32.2% (10,307) African American, 30.9% (9,880) White, 8.7% (2,793) Asian, 0.2% (78) Native American, 0.0% (4) Pacific Islander, 0.2% (67) from other races, and 1.5% (467) from two or more races. Hispanic or Latino of any race were 26.2% (8,369) of the population. 82% of the population were high school graduates and 40% had a bachelor's degree or higher.

The entirety of Community Board 13 had 106,459 inhabitants as of NYC Health's 2018 Community Health Profile, with an average life expectancy of 80.4 years. This is lower than the median life expectancy of 81.2 for all New York City neighborhoods. Most inhabitants are adults, with 25% between the ages of 25–44, 27% between 45 and 64, and 22% who are at least 65 years old. The ratio of young and college-aged residents was lower, at 19% and 8%, respectively. Coney Island's elderly population, as a share of the area's total population, is higher than in other New York City neighborhoods.

As of 2016, the median household income in Community District 13 was $39,213. In 2018, an estimated 24% of Coney Island residents lived in poverty, compared to 21% in all of Brooklyn and 20% in all of New York City. One in eight residents (11%) were unemployed, compared to 9% in the rest of both Brooklyn and New York City. Rent burden, or the percentage of residents who have difficulty paying their rent, is 55% in Coney Island, slightly higher than the citywide and boroughwide rates of 52% and 51%, respectively. Based on this calculation, as of 2018, Coney Island is not considered to be gentrifying.

=== 2020s ===
According to the 2020 census data from New York City Department of City Planning, there were between 20,000 and 29,999 White residents, 10,000 to 19,999 Black residents, 5,000 to 9,999 Hispanic residents, and less than 5000 Asian residents.

In Coney Island, there has been a modest influx of Chinese immigrants moving in intermixing with other ethnic populations, especially since Hurricane Sandy in 2012. The Chinese population in the neighborhood nearly doubled between 2000 and 2013. Asian populations are located near Neptune and Mermaid Avenues west of Stillwell Avenue. The trend is largely due to their population spillover from other southern Brooklyn areas.

== Political representation ==
Politically, Coney Island is in New York's 8th congressional district. It is also in the New York State Senate's 23rd district, the New York State Assembly's 46th district, and the New York City Council's 47th district.

== Police and crime ==
Coney Island is patrolled by the New York City Police Department (NYPD)'s 60th Precinct, located at 2950 West Eighth Street. Transit District 34 is located at 1243 Surf Avenue, within the Coney Island–Stillwell Avenue subway station.

The 60th Precinct ranked 34th safest out of 69 patrol areas for per-capita crime in 2010. Between 1993 and 2010, major crimes decreased by 72%, including a 76% decrease in robberies, 71% decrease in felony assaults, and 67% decrease in shootings. As of 2018, with a non-fatal assault rate of 51 per 100,000 people, Coney Island's rate of violent crimes per capita is less than that of the city as a whole. The incarceration rate of 168 per 100,000 people is about the same as that of the city as a whole. The 60th Precinct has a substantially lower crime rate than in the 1990s, with crimes across all categories having decreased by 77.5% between 1990 and 2022. The precinct reported five murders, 16 rapes, 179 robberies, 373 felony assaults, 159 burglaries, 527 grand larcenies, and 121 grand larcenies auto in 2022.

== Fire safety ==
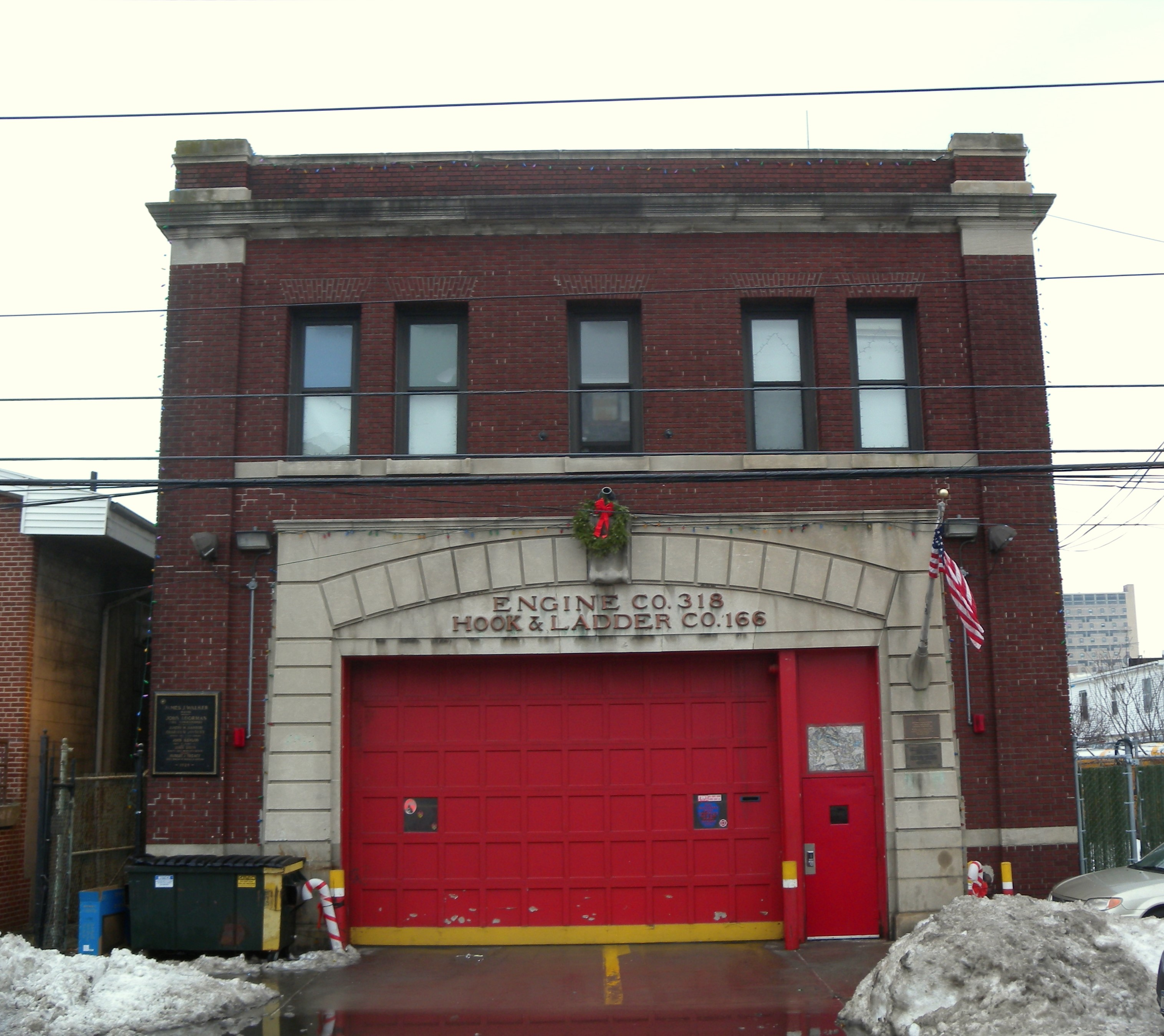
Engine Co. 318/Ladder Co. 166

The New York City Fire Department (FDNY) operates two firehouses in the area. Engine Company 318/Ladder Company 166 is located at 2510 Neptune Avenue. It contains the Coney Island Fire Station Pumping Station, listed on the National Register of Historic Places. Engine Company 245/Ladder Company 161/Battalion 43 is located at 2929 West 8th Street. In addition, FDNY EMS Station 43 is on the grounds of Coney Island Hospital.

== Health ==
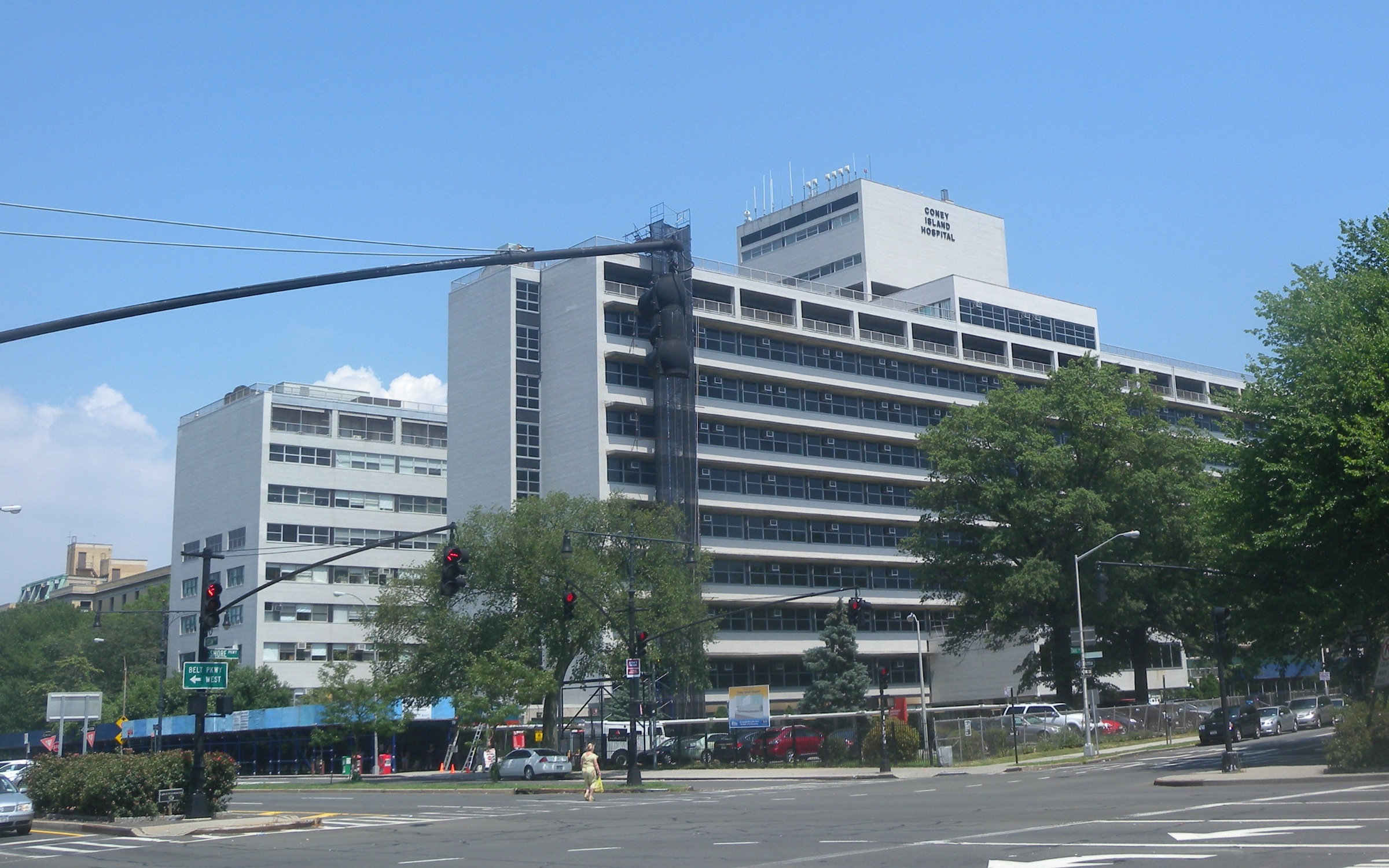
Coney Island Hospital

As of 2018, preterm births and births to teenage mothers are slightly more common in Coney Island than in other places citywide. In Coney Island, there were 95 preterm births per 1,000 live births (compared to 87 per 1,000 citywide) and 20.2 births to teenage mothers per 1,000 live births (compared to 19.3 per 1,000 citywide), slightly higher than in the median neighborhood. Coney Island has a high population of residents who are uninsured, or who receive healthcare through Medicaid. In 2018, this population of uninsured residents was estimated to be 14%, which is higher than the citywide rate of 12%.

The concentration of fine particulate matter, the deadliest type of air pollutant, in Coney Island is 0.0067 milligrams per cubic metre (6.7×10^{−9} oz/ft^{3}), lower than the citywide and boroughwide averages. Nineteen percent of Coney Island residents are smokers, which is higher the city average of 14% of residents being smokers. In Coney Island, 28% of residents are obese, 15% are diabetic, and 31% have high blood pressure—higher than the citywide averages of 24%, 11%, and 28%, respectively. In addition, 18% of children are obese, compared to the citywide average of 20%.

Ninety-two percent of residents eat some fruits and vegetables every day, which is slightly higher than the city's average of 87%. In 2018, 70% of residents described their health as "good", "very good", or "excellent", lower than the city's average of 78%. For every supermarket in Coney Island, there are 21 bodegas. The primary hospital in the neighborhood is Coney Island Hospital. In addition, NYC Health + Hospitals' Ida G. Israel Community Health Center is on Surf Avenue, and there is a substance-abuse treatment center on West 16th Street.

== Post offices and ZIP Codes ==
Coney Island's primary ZIP Code is 11224, though small portions located east of West 1st Street and Ocean Parkway are located in ZIP Code 11235. There are two United States Post Office branches in Coney Island. The Coney Island Station is located at 2727 Mermaid Avenue, and the Neptune Station is located at 532 Neptune Avenue.

== Education ==
Coney Island generally has a similar ratio of college-educated residents to the rest of the city as of 2018. While 45% of residents age 25 and older have a college education or higher, 18% have less than a high school education and 37% are high school graduates or have some college education. By contrast, 40% of Brooklynites and 38% of city residents have a college education or higher. The percentage of Coney Island students excelling in math has been increasing, though reading achievement has declined; math achievement rose from 53 percent in 2000 to 72 percent in 2011, but reading achievement fell from 57 to 55 percent within the same time period.

Coney Island's rate of elementary school student absenteeism is higher than the rest of New York City. In Coney Island, 26% of elementary school students missed twenty or more days per school year, compared to the citywide average of 20% of students.

=== Elementary, middle, and high schools ===
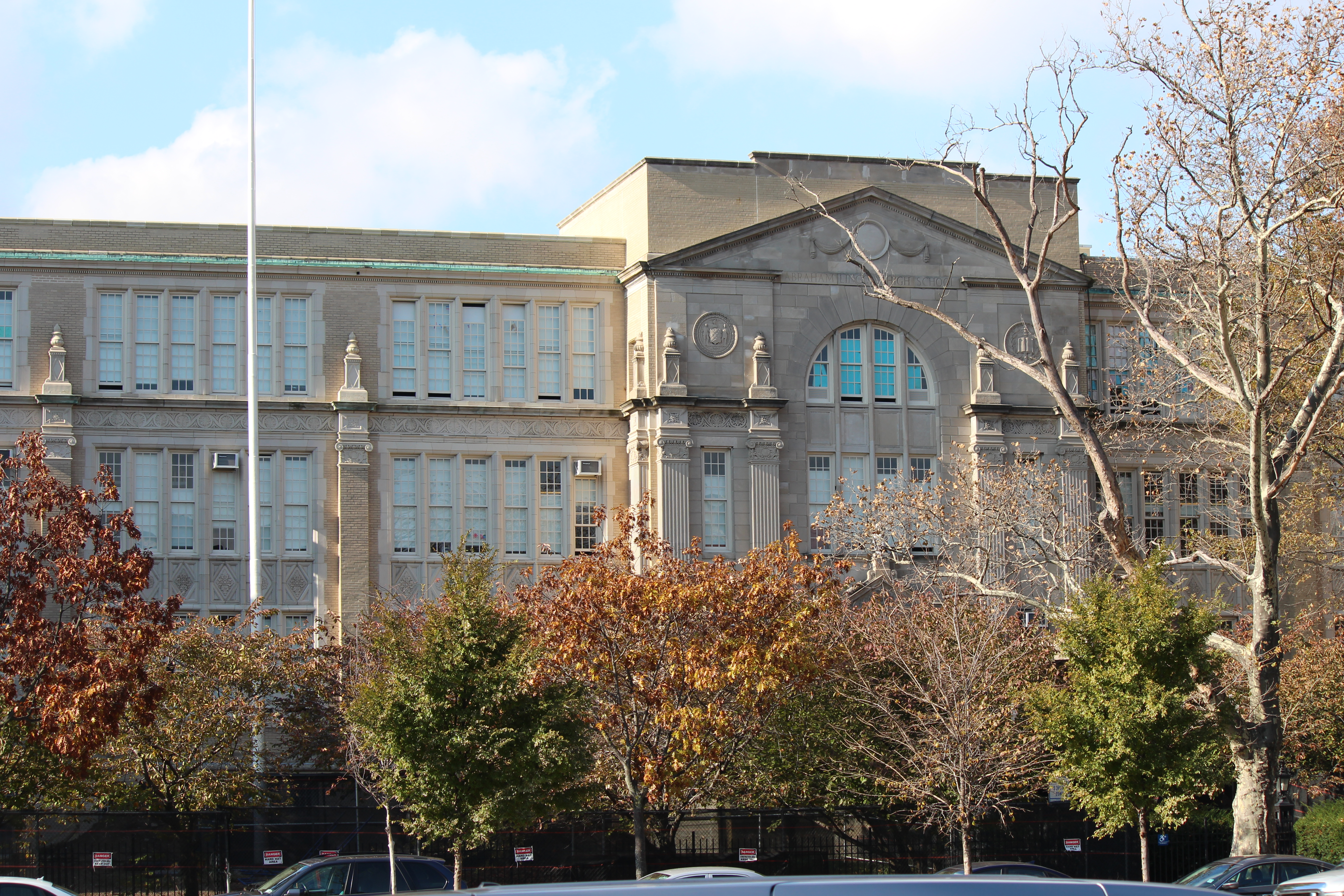
Abraham Lincoln High School

Coney Island is served by the New York City Department of Education, and students in the neighborhood are automatically "zoned" into the nearest public schools. The zoned schools for the main portion of Coney Island include:

- PS 90 Edna Cohen School (grades K-5)
- PS 100 Coney Island School (grades K-5)
- PS 188 The Michael E. Berdy School (grades K-4)
- PS/IS 288 The Shirley Tanyhill School (grades PK-8)
- IS 303 Herbert S. Eisenberg (grades 6–8)
- PS 329 (grades PK-5)

IS 239, the Mark Twain School for the Gifted and Talented (6–8), is a magnet school for gifted students, and it accepts students from around the city. In 2006, David Scharfenberg of The New York Times said, "Coney Island's elementary schools are a mixed lot, with only some exceeding citywide averages on the state's testing regimen."

All New York City high school students can go to any high school in the city. There are two public high schools in Coney Island: Abraham Lincoln High School and Rachel Carson High School for Coastal Studies.

=== Public library ===
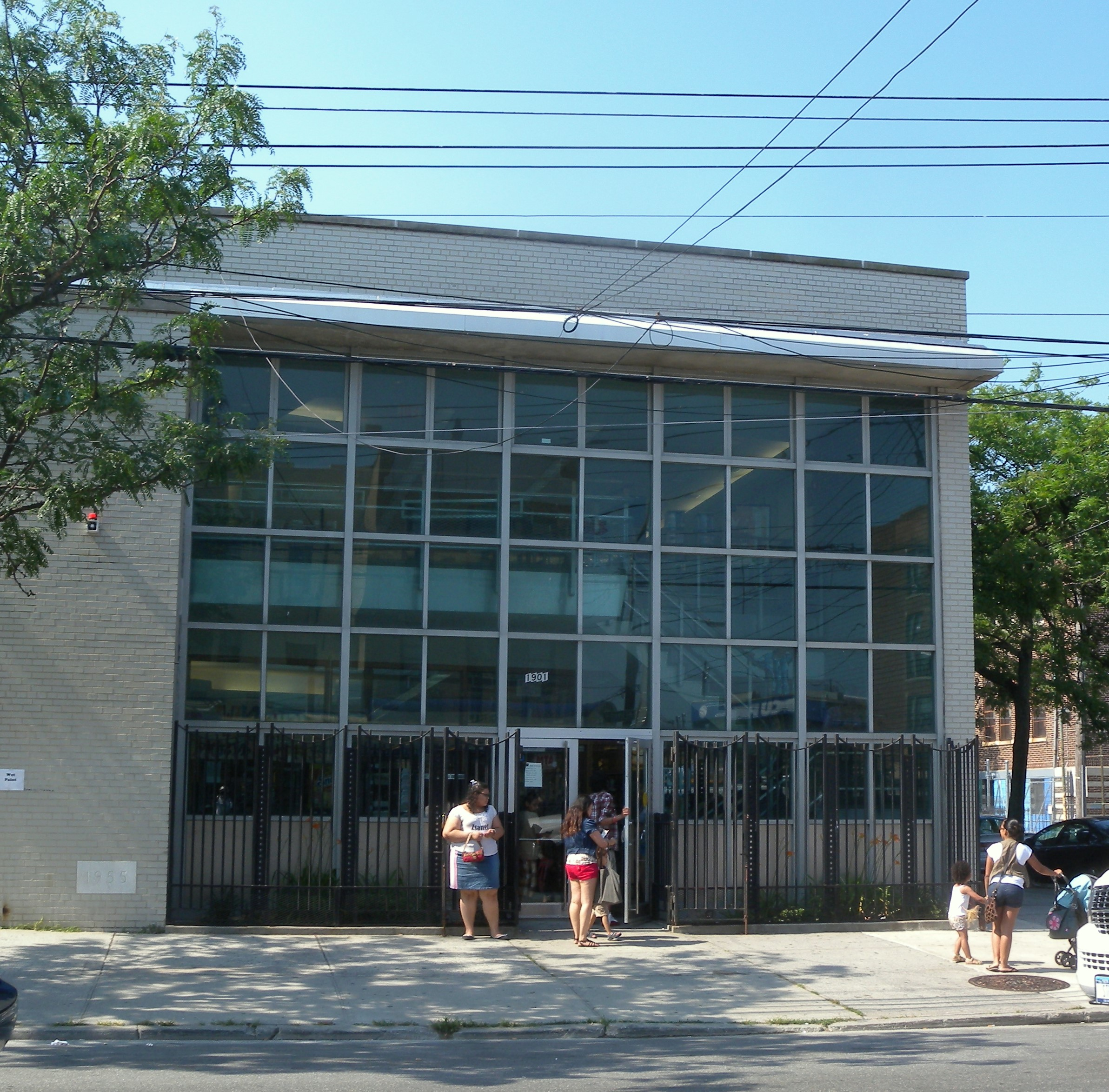
Coney Island library branch

The Brooklyn Public Library (BPL)'s Coney Island branch is located at 1901 Mermaid Avenue, near the intersection with West 19th Street. It opened in 1911 as an unmanned deposit station. Ten years later, it moved to the former Coney Island Times offices and became fully staffed. In 1954 another branch was built. According to BPL's website, the library was referred to as "the first-ever library built on stilts over the Atlantic Ocean." The branch was rebuilt in 2013 after being damaged in Hurricane Sandy.

== Transportation ==
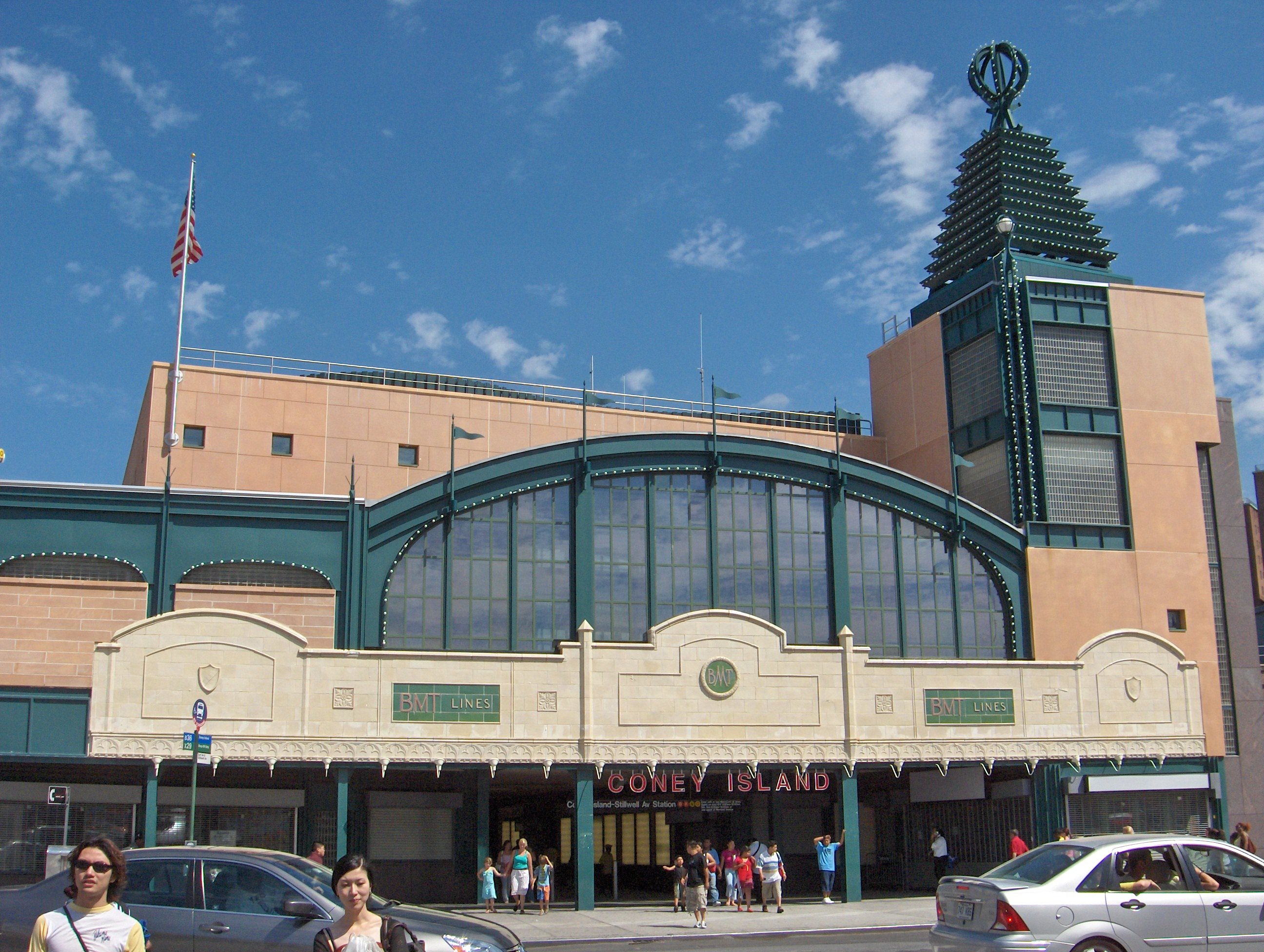
Coney Island–Stillwell Avenue station

Coney Island is served by four New York City Subway stations. The Coney Island–Stillwell Avenue station, the terminal of the D, F, <F>, N, and Q trains, is one of the largest elevated rapid transit stations in the world, with eight tracks serving four platforms. The entire station, built in 1917–1920 as a replacement for the former surface-level Culver Depot, was rebuilt in 2001–2004. The other subway stations within Coney Island are West Eighth Street–New York Aquarium, served by the F, <F>, and Q trains; Neptune Avenue, served by the F and <F> trains; and Ocean Parkway, served by the Q train.

A bus terminal beneath the Stillwell Avenue station serves the B68 to Prospect Park, the B74 to Sea Gate, the B64 to Bay Ridge, and the B82 to Canarsie and Starrett City. Additionally, the B36 runs from Sea Gate to Sheepshead Bay. The B1 and B4 both make stops on the neighborhood's border with Brighton Beach along Ocean Parkway, between Shore Parkway, Neptune and Brighton Beach Avenues. The X28 and X38 provide express bus service to Manhattan.

The three main west–east arteries in the neighborhood are (from north to south) Neptune Avenue, Mermaid Avenue, and Surf Avenue. Neptune Avenue becomes Emmons Avenue at Sheepshead Bay, while Surf Avenue becomes Ocean Parkway and then runs north toward Prospect Park. The north–south cross streets in Coney Island are numbered, with "West" prepended to their numbers. The street numbers run from West 1st Street at Coney Island's eastern border to West 37th Street at the western border, adjacent to Sea Gate.

Coney Island contains several bicycle paths. The Ocean Parkway bicycle path terminates in the neighborhood, while the Shore Parkway bike path (part of the Brooklyn Waterfront Greenway) runs east along Jamaica Bay and west and north along New York Harbor. On-street bike lanes are marked on Neptune Avenue and other streets in Coney Island. In addition, the Riegelmann Boardwalk is open to cyclists during the daytime, though bicycling hours are restricted during the summer months.

In 2019, NYC Ferry announced that the western part of Coney Island would be served by the Coney Island ferry route. The implementation of the Coney Island route was delayed indefinitely in 2022 due to local opposition that focused on safety and navigational issues. After the creekside ferry route was deemed unfeasible, a group of residents and politicians advocated for an ocean-side Steeplechase Pier Coney Island Ferry landing. In 2025, council member Justin Brannan, state senator Jessica Scarcella-Spanton, and the New York City Economic Development Corporation, oversaw the installation of a buoy that collects data on wind and wave conditions in the vicinity of the proposed Steeplechase Pier Coney Island Ferry landing to further study the feasibility of an ocean-side ferry landing at Coney Island.

== In popular culture ==
Coney Island has been featured in many novels, films, television shows, cartoons, and theatrical plays. This is linked to its iconic status as a vacation destination. Various slapstick comedies and films have been set at Coney Island or allude to it. There have also been several television documentaries about the area's history.

== Notable people ==
Notable current and former residents of Coney Island include:

- Bud Abbott (1897–1974), comedian, actor and producer. He was best known as the straight man half of the comedy duo Abbott and Costello
- Ken Auletta (born 1942), author, political columnist for the New York Daily News and media critic for The New Yorker
- Joe Bonomo (strongman) (1901–1978), weightlifter, strongman, film stunt performer and actor
- Jerry Della Femina (born 1936), advertising executive and restaurateur
- Mary E. Dillon (1886–1983), businesswoman and president of Brooklyn Borough Gas Company
- Jeffrey Epstein (1953–2019), financier and child sex offender
- Harold Feinstein (1931–2015), photographer
- Gene Feist (1923–2014), playwright, theater director and co-founder of the Roundabout Theater Company
- Irving Feldman (born 1928), poet and professor of English
- Sandra Feldman (1939–2005), educator and labor leader who served as president of the American Federation of Teachers
- Nat Finkelstein (1933–2009), photographer and photojournalist
- Debbie Goad (1954–2000), journalist and assistant editor of the magazine Answer Me!
- Arlene Gottfried (1950–2017), street photographer who was known for recording the candid scenes of ordinary daily life
- Gilbert Gottfried (1955–2022), stand-up comedian and actor, best known for his exaggerated shrill voice
- Marty Greenbaum (1934–2020), painter, mixed media assemblage and book artist
- Pamela Harris, politician who was a member of the New York State Assembly representing the 46th Assembly District from 2015 to 2018
- Marcus Illions (c. 1871–1949), master carver of wooden carousel horses in the early 20th century, who was called "the Michelangelo of carousel carvers" by The New York Times
- Rena Kanokogi (1935–2009), judo expert
- Robert Kirsch (1922–1980), literary critic and author, who was the literary editor of the Los Angeles Times for two decades
- Saritha Komatireddy (born 1984 or 1985), American federal prosecutor and former chief of staff of the U.S. Drug Enforcement Administration, Republican nominee for attorney general of New York in the 2026 election.
- Stephon Marbury (born 1977), former professional basketball player
- Pellegrino Morano (1877–unknown), head of a group of Neapolitan criminals with roots in the Camorra
- Nikita Nesterenko (born 2001), professional ice hockey center who currently plays for the San Diego Gulls
- Rhea Perlman (born 1948), actress
- E. J. Perry (1880–1946), early-twentieth-century silhouette artist
- Joe Rollino (1905–2010), weightlifter and strongman who dubbed himself the world's strongest man in the 1920s
- Larry Rosenberg (born 1932), Buddhist teacher
- Jay Sexter, educator who was the president of Mercy College
- Ayisha Siddiqa (born 1999), climate justice advocate
- Don Snyder (1934–2010), photographer and multimedia artist
- George C. Tilyou (1862–1914), entrepreneur and showman who founded Steeplechase Park
- Burt Topper (1928–2007), film director and screenwriter best known for cult films
- Arthur Tress (born 1940), photographer known for his staged surrealism
