= Steeplechase Park =

Amusement park in New York City (1897–1964)

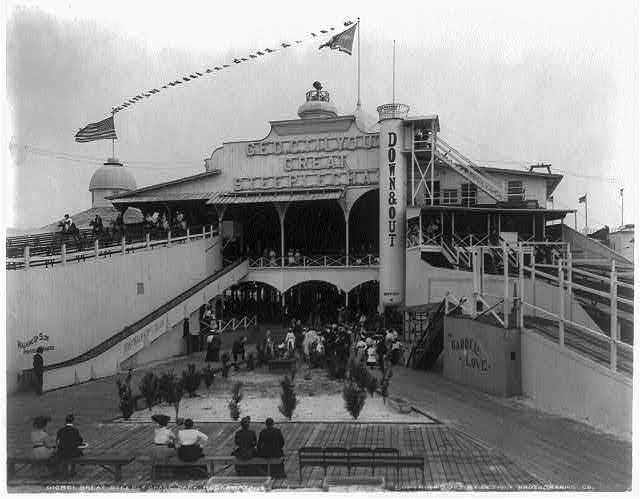
- Entrance to Steeplechase Park
- Interactive map of Steeplechase Park
- Location: Brooklyn, New York, United States
- Coordinates: 40°34′27″N 73°58′50″W
- Status: Defunct
- Opened: 1897
- Closed: 1964
- Owner: George C. Tilyou
- Operated by: Tilyou family
- General manager: George C. Tilyou (1897–1914); Thomas F. McGowan (1914–1927); James J. Onorato (1927–1959); Marie Tilyou (1959–1964)
- Area: 15 acres (6.1 ha)

Steeplechase Park was an amusement park that operated in the Coney Island neighborhood of Brooklyn in New York City, United States, from 1897 to 1964. Steeplechase Park was created by the entrepreneur George C. Tilyou as the first of the three large amusement parks built on Coney Island, the other two being Luna Park (1903–1944) and Dreamland (1904–1911). Of the three, Steeplechase was the longest-lasting, running for 67 years.

The park covered 15 acres (6.1 ha) at its peak. Its first rides were standalone attractions scattered around Coney Island that Tilyou had purchased in the early 1890s. Steeplechase itself opened in 1897 to unite these formerly separate attractions, and quickly gained popularity as a family-friendly destination with exhibitionist and risque undertones. It was destroyed by fire in 1907, but was quickly rebuilt. Steeplechase remained profitable as the Tilyou family continually brought in new rides and new amusements, such as the Parachute Jump. However, by the 1960s Steeplechase Park was becoming unprofitable due to high crime, the growth of suburban getaways, and the area's general trend toward residential development.

After the park closed in 1964, developer Fred Trump purchased the land and planned to develop it for residential use, but this never occurred, and the site was used seasonally for amusement rides during the 1970s. A dispute ensued over the proposed use of the Steeplechase Park site in the 1980s and 1990s, as two developers disagreed over whether to rebuild the amusement park or build a sports complex on the site. A minor-league baseball stadium called Keyspan Park (now Maimonides Park) was built in 2001.

The Parachute Jump is the only remaining portion of the former amusement park. The New York City Department of Parks and Recreation maintains the land under Maimonides Park as part of a green space also called Steeplechase Park. Steeplechase Plaza, a portion of Luna Park (2010) that contains the B&B Carousell, was named in homage to the former Steeplechase Park.

== History ==
Steeplechase was created by George C. Tilyou (1862–1914). On his honeymoon in 1893, he and his wife visited the World's Columbian Exposition in Chicago, where he saw the 250-foot-diameter (76 m) Ferris wheel and wanted to buy it. Since the wheel had already been sold, Tilyou built his own half-size version at Surf Avenue, on Coney Island, which soon became Coney Island's biggest attraction. After noting that the nearby Sheepshead Bay, Gravesend and Brighton Beach horseracing tracks were very popular, Tilyou added other rides and attractions on the Coney Island peninsula. He came to own several rides, though none were part of a single park. In fact, until the opening of Paul Boyton's Sea Lion Park nearby in 1895, all of Coney Island's rides were separately operated. As a result, Tilyou's concessions were originally overshadowed by the saloons on nearby Bowery Street.

=== 1897–1907: Creation and early years ===
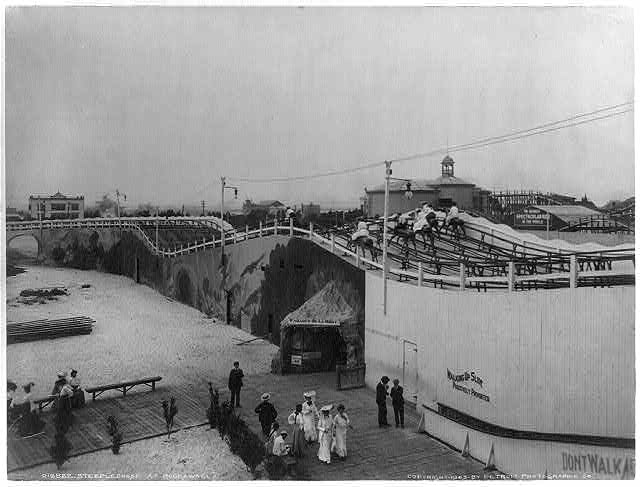
The steeplechase ride

Steeplechase Park opened in 1897 after Tilyou bought and improved the Steeplechase Horses attraction. Steeplechase Horses, manufactured by J.W. Cawdry, featured gravity-pulled mechanical horses racing along metal tracks. The park covered 15 acres (6.1 ha), an area of which Tilyou owned two-thirds outright; the other third was leased from the Huber family. It was located at the western end of Bowery Street. Steeplechase was approached by a grand stone archway on Surf Avenue to the north, the top of the archway decorated by four stone horses. The inclusion of a gateway, along with a new 25-cent admission charge, were intended to exclude the "seedier elements" and make the park a family destination. Drinking was prohibited, as was gambling and prostitution.

The park included over 50 attractions on its midway alone. Attractions included novelties such as the Human Niagara, a Venetian gondola-style ride, the Aerial Racing Slide, the Double-Dip Chutes, the Bicycle Railway, a "French Voyage" panorama, and a Wild West sideshow. Tilyou also operated a small steam railroad, a saltwater pool, a ballroom, and the Scenic Railroad coaster by LaMarcus Thompson. Completing the park were scale models of world landmarks such as the Eiffel Tower and Big Ben. Steeplechase Pier, a pier jutting into the ocean, was built to the south of the park in 1904. Tilyou adopted a "Funny Face" mascot depicting a smiling man with several dozen teeth, nicknamed "the Tilly", as the icon for his park. The mascot, which became a symbol of Coney Island, represented the area's wholesomeness and neoclassical architecture combined with its veneer of hidden sexuality. Tilyou's personal motto, "Keep 'em laughing", was symbolized by rides with such unconventional names as Whirlpool, Soup Bowl, Human Roulette, Human Pool Table, and Earthquake Staircase.

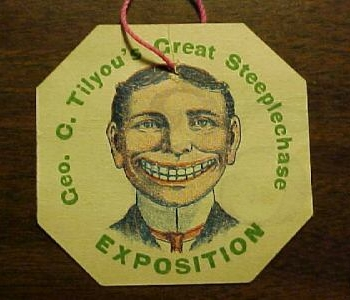
An admissions ticket for Steeplechase Park from 1905. George C. Tilyou's "Funny Face" logo became the iconic symbol of Coney Island.

In 1901, Tilyou visited the Pan-American Exposition at Buffalo, New York, to find additional rides for Steeplechase Park. He approached Frederic Thompson (no relation to LaMarcus) and Elmer "Skip" Dundy, the creators of the popular A Trip To The Moon ride, to ask if they would bring their ride to Steeplechase. The ride, an indoor dark ride that simulated a space flight, had been popular in the exposition, and Thompson and Dundy signed an agreement to relocate it to Steeplechase for a year. However, a rainy 1902 season reduced the profits of amusement park operators at Coney Island that year and forced the closure of the adjacent Sea Lion Park. Thompson and Dundy spent $700,000 rebuilding Sea Lion and moved Trip to the Moon to the newly expanded park, now called Luna Park, in 1903.

Following Luna Park's success, another amusement park on Coney Island, Dreamland, opened in 1904. At Coney Island's peak in the middle of the 20th century's first decade, the three amusement parks competed with each other and with many independent amusements. This was attributed partially to the variety of transit options available: by 1904, there were five railroads to Coney Island. Both Luna Park and Dreamland had more expensive attractions than Steeplechase Park. Tilyou countered this by modifying and adding contraptions for his customers, most of which carried an exhibitionist and risque undertone but were nonetheless popular. The entrance contained the Barrel of Fun, a 30-by-10-foot (9.1 by 3.0 m) revolving drum that threw visitors onto each other. Other contraptions included the Human Roulette Wheel, Earthquake Stairway, Dew Drop, Whichway, and Wedding Ring. All of these rides tossed riders around, often on top of each other, as they were designed under the assumption that men and women wanted any excuses to grab onto each other.

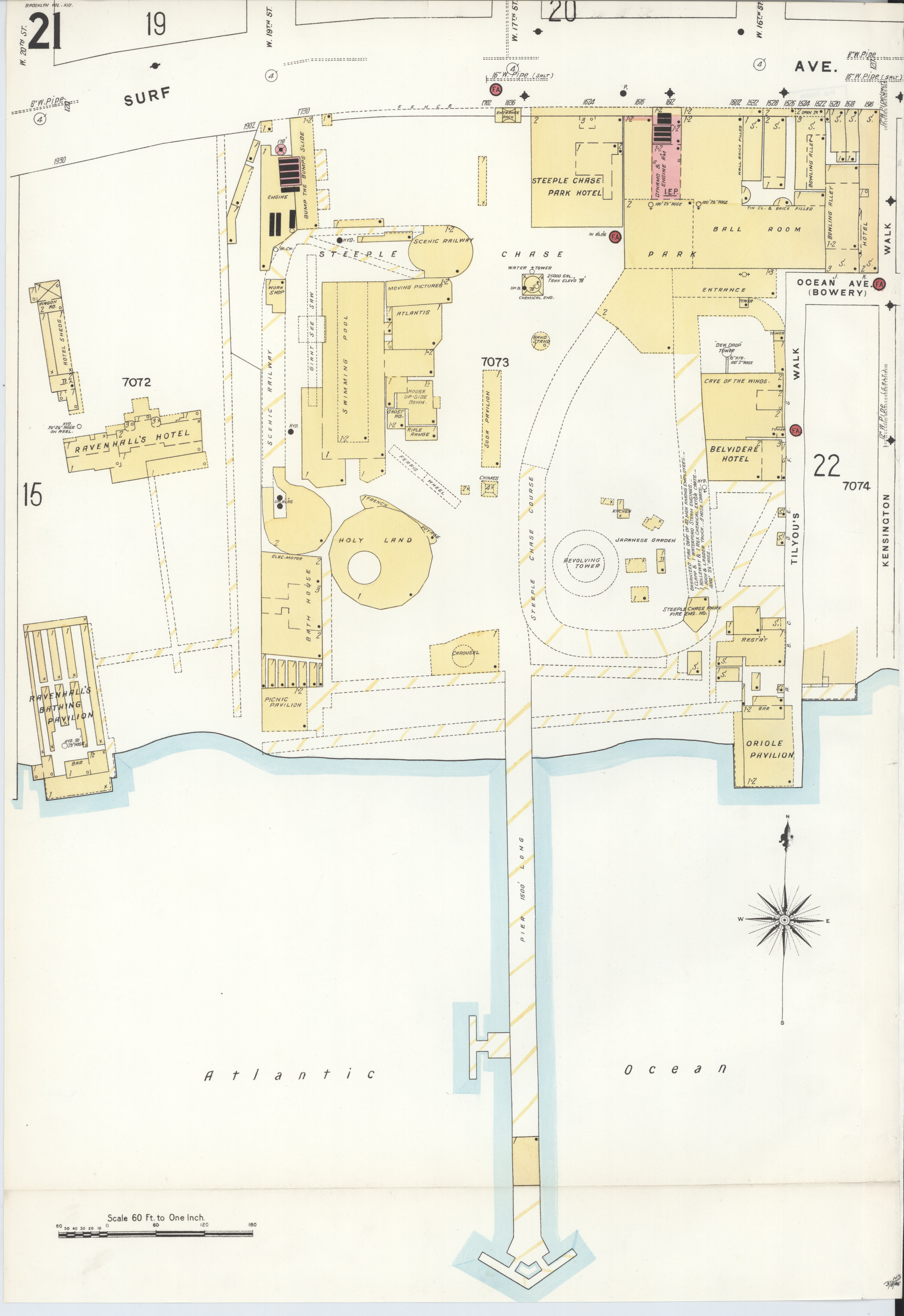
Steeplechase Park as seen in 1906

The success of Steeplechase and other parks in Coney Island inspired Tilyou to create additional amusement parks in the New York City area and elsewhere. In November 1904, Tilyou announced that he would sell Steeplechase Park to a syndicate of investors for $1.25 million, since he wanted to operate another amusement park in Rockaway, Queens. However, the sale of Steeplechase was annulled in February 1905 after $50,000 had been paid, since "defective titles" prevented the syndicate from purchasing some of the land under the park. From 1905 to 1907, Tilyou refined Steeplechase Park with attractions such as a miniature railroad, an orchestra stand, the Cave of the Winds, a Fads and Fantasy Building, the Limit Building, and a children's pony track. The Limit Building was short-lived, being replaced by the Monte Carlo Building in 1907.

=== 1907 fire and rebuilding ===
In the early morning of July 29, 1907, a fire started in the Cave of the Winds attraction. It spread quickly, destroying most of the wooden pavilions and hotels around Bowery Street; firefighters fought to save Tilyou's house at the corner of Steeplechase Park. The three-alarm fire was extinguished after two hours, but about 35 acres (14 ha) of Coney Island was destroyed. Steeplechase Park bore much of the damage, which was estimated at $1.5 million, but several hotels were also ruined. Even though the fire destroyed nearly everything within Steeplechase Park, Tilyou reportedly remained calm throughout, even promising to host events that had been planned in the park before the fire. The morning after the fire, Tilyou posted a sign in front of the park, which read:

To My Friends: I have troubles today that I had not yesterday. I had troubles yesterday which I have not today. On this site will be built a bigger, better, Steeplechase Park. Admission to the burning ruins — Ten cents.

Tilyou stated that the park would be restored to a "grander than ever" condition, but in the meantime, he would erect temporary tent shows. The remaining attractions opened one week after the fire. Ultimately, the park was rebuilt with fireproof steel-and-concrete structures, as the municipality had passed a law restricting the construction of combustible wooden structures. The park's reconstruction was funded by a $2 million stock measure issued by the Steeplechase Park Company, which Tilyou established in 1908. Tilyou sold 100,000 shares in that company to the public and gave a season pass to everyone who bought a $5 stock certificate. The park partially reopened in April 1908. The New York Times described the construction as "scarcely finished" and that crowds "flocked" to the rebuilt attractions.

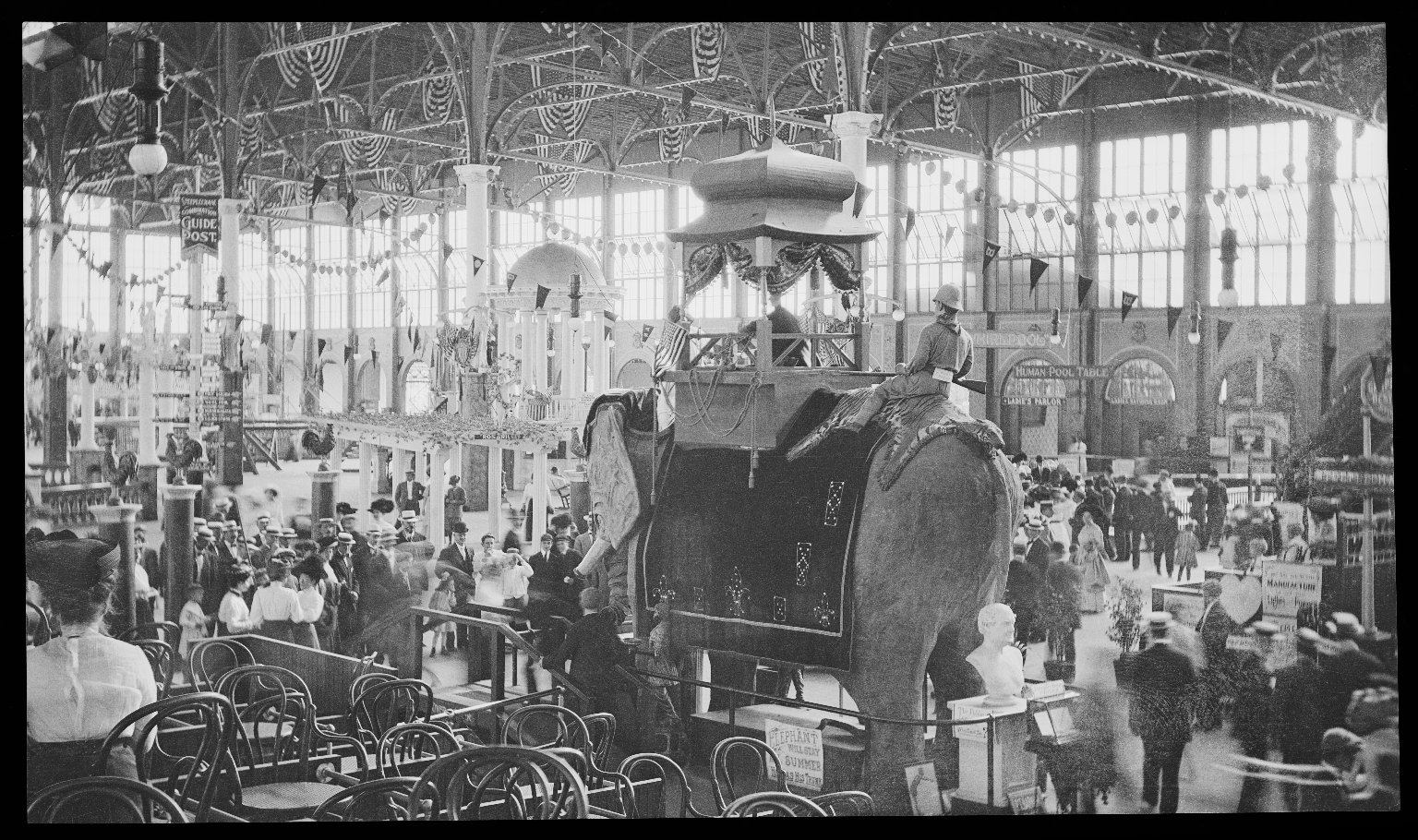
A decorative indoor elephant in Steeplechase's vast Pavilion of Fun by Eugene Wemlinger, 1910. Brooklyn Museum.

The reconstruction was completed in 1909. The rebuilt park's main attraction was the Pavilion of Fun, a steel-and-glass enclosure measuring 450 by 280 feet (137 by 85 m), with an area of 2.8 acres (11,000 m^{2}). It contained several rides and tawdry, exhibitionist attractions reminiscent of the previous iteration of Steeplechase Park, such as the Human Wheel, Human Niagara, the Mixer, and the Grinder. The Pavilion of Fun had opened during the 1908 season. The Ferris wheel was salvaged from the original park and was placed outdoors. A new Steeplechase Horses attraction was built around the pavilion, designed so that riders had to exit through the Pavilion of Fun. Steeplechase also included two new entrances, a 300-by-40-foot (91 by 12 m) plaza overlooking a sunken garden, the Palace of Pleasure, a ballroom, and various sideshows. Other attractions included airships, Venetian gondolas, and an Automobile ride similar to that in the first Steeplechase Park. There were eight roller coasters inside the rebuilt park as well. As before the fire, admission was 25 cents. A "combo" admission ticket entitled the holder to one experience on each of the park's 25 attractions.

=== 1910s and 1920s ===
Tilyou continued to add attractions to Steeplechase in the late 1900s and early 1910s. He added the first of several carousels to the park in 1908, and the "World's Largest Swimming Pool" was completed the following year. Tilyou opened a hall with an indoor swimming pool to the west of the pavilion in 1911, at which point he declared that he wanted to add one new ride per week. Several attractions opened in 1912, including the El Dorado Carousel and other structures salvaged from Dreamland after it was destroyed in a 1911 fire. Around this time, local residents and businesspeople were advocating for the construction of a public beach and boardwalk along the Atlantic Ocean. The New York Supreme Court ruled in 1913 that the state government could take over a 633-by-126-foot (193 by 38 m) section of Steeplechase Park, along the Atlantic shoreline, to make way for the public beach.

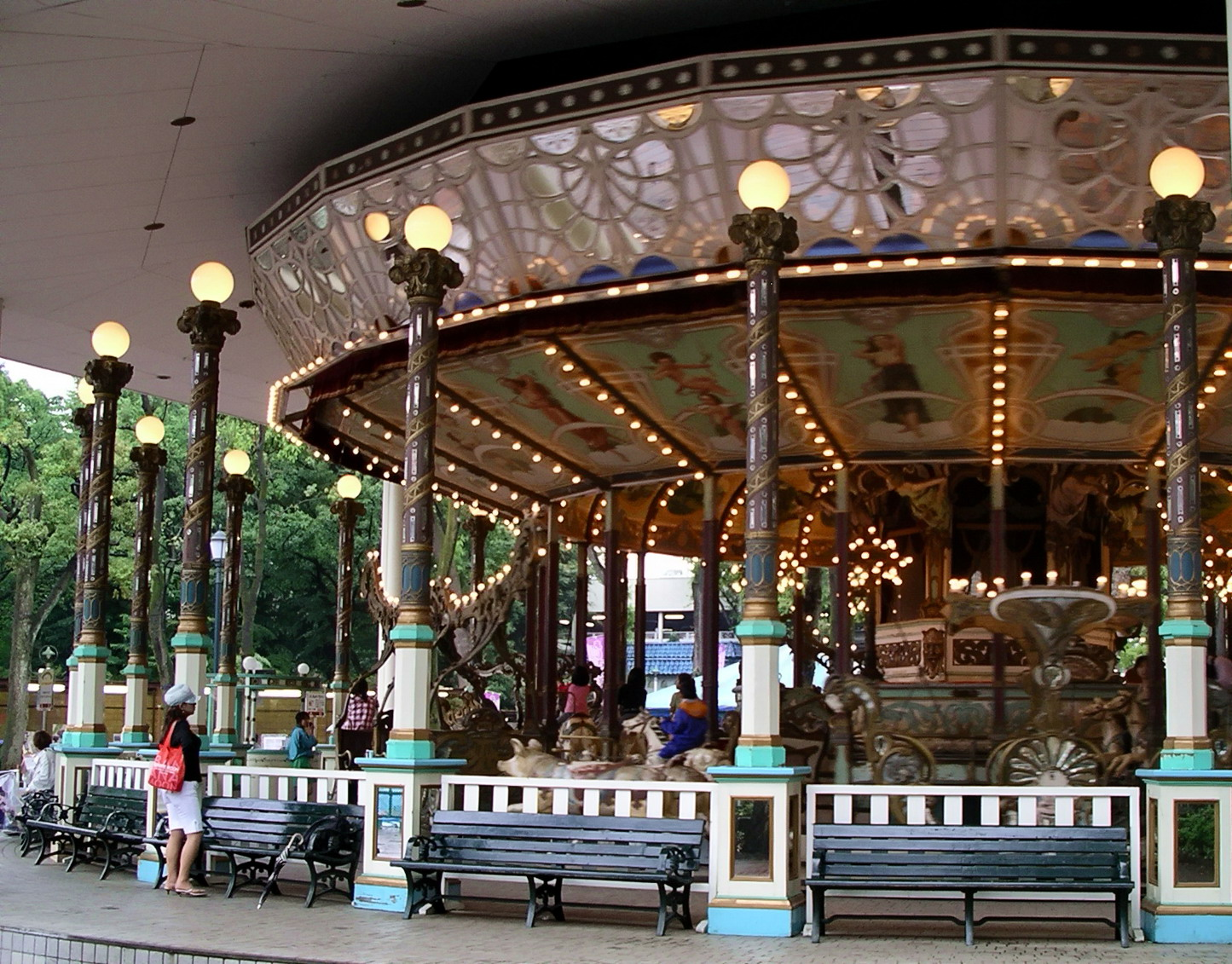
El Dorado Carousel, now located at the Toshimaen amusement park in Tokyo

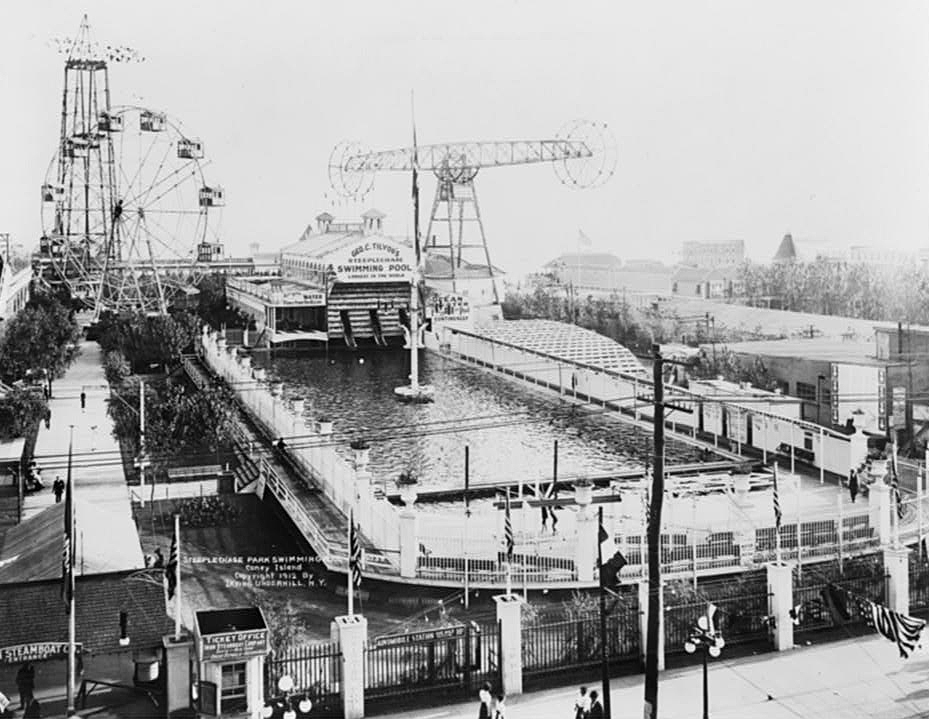
Outdoor pool, seen in 1912

In 1914, Tilyou died, leaving the care of the park to his children; Thomas F. McGowan then became general manager of the park. Steeplechase would remain within the Tilyou family until it closed a half-century later. George's oldest son Edward, an 18-year-old at the time of his father's death, constructed a skating rink at Steeplechase in 1915. A Racing Derby Carousel by master carousel builder Marcus Illions was added in 1920, and it featured 16 rows of four horses cycling up-and-down on small tracks within the carousel. Shortly afterward, Edward Tilyou also added "Babyland", a children's play area near the southeast corner of the park. Other attractions built in the early 1920s included the Frolic spinning ride, bumper cars, the Witchway swing, and a Caterpillar flat ride. By the early 1920s, the crowds at Steeplechase and other Coney Island parks had become more mellow and orderly, though the beachfront in general was described as rundown. Steeplechase Park started hosting several beauty contests near its outdoor pool, providing more entertainment for park patrons. These included the "Modern Venus" Bathing Beauty Contest, first held in 1922, and Grandma's Beauty Contest, which started in 1932.

This period also saw the destruction of some structures, such as the Upside-Down House burning down in 1911. Additionally, Steeplechase lost its private beach during the early 1910s. Following a 1912 lawsuit by New York State against Tilyou and other amusement owners for taking private ownership of Coney Island's beach, a judge ruled in 1913 that the beach actually belonged to the state. An appellate court affirmed this decision in 1916, with an exception made for part of Steeplechase Park, a plot of land granted by the state prior to the creation of the park itself. All obstructions on the beachfront, including a concrete walk within Steeplechase, were demolished in accordance with the ruling.

The Riegelmann Boardwalk was opened on the waterfront in 1922. In conjunction with the boardwalk's opening, the city slightly relocated West 16th and West 19th Streets at Steeplechase Park's eastern and western borders, respectively, which resulted in a slight expansion to Steeplechase's area. The boardwalk's opening resulted in increases to real estate valuations at nearby areas, such as Steeplechase Park, though some lots were also taken from the park to make way for new streets leading to the boardwalk. As a result, a former Brooklyn engineer alleged that the Tilyous lost money from the relocation of West 16th and West 19th Streets. The boardwalk's completion and a subsequent widening of Surf Avenue in 1924 prompted Edward Tilyou to make additional improvements to Steeplechase Park. The mid-1920s were described as the "golden age" of roller coasters on Coney Island: two gravity rides called the Zip and the Limit were constructed in Steeplechase Park, and immediately to the east, independent ride operator George Moran built the Thunderbolt roller coaster. Also built were a water ride called the "Old Mill tunnel of love" and a Noah's Ark-style attraction. Thomas McGowan died unexpectedly in 1927 and was replaced by James J. Onorato. The following year, one of the pools was demolished and replaced with an attraction called Hey Day, while a gas-powered Custer Cars attraction was installed on the boardwalk.

=== 1930s: Great Depression through World War II ===
The Great Depression resulted in significantly decreased attendance at Steeplechase Park. Before money ran out, a one-ring circus was constructed between the Limit coaster and an adjacent pool, while a children's wading pool was constructed. In addition, a carousel was constructed at West 16th Street in 1930, and the Whale and the Whip replaced Noah's Ark the following year. People still came to see the beauty contests at Steeplechase Park. In 1934, when finances slowly started to improve, a bobsled roller coaster model called Flying Turns was installed at Steeplechase.

Several accidents and fires continued to occur at Steeplechase. A fire in July 1932 caused $1.5 million in damage and injured six people, and left at least a thousand people homeless. However, Steeplechase Park and Luna Park were not as heavily damaged since the fire was mostly concentrated to the west. There were other incidents as well: in 1933, fifty-seven people were hurt in a balcony collapse caused by overcrowding, and three years later, a barge crashed into the Steeplechase Pier. In addition, patrons frequently received minor injuries such as friction burns, though some people were thrown or fell from rides, and one child died after falling off the Steeplechase Horses in 1935. A conflagration in September 1939 caused $200,000 in damage and injured 18 people. The concessions on the boardwalk were destroyed, as was the entrance to the park from the boardwalk, and several attractions within the park itself. The following year, a new brick concession structure was built on the site of the old concessions, and an Express Train ride was erected in front of the pavilion.

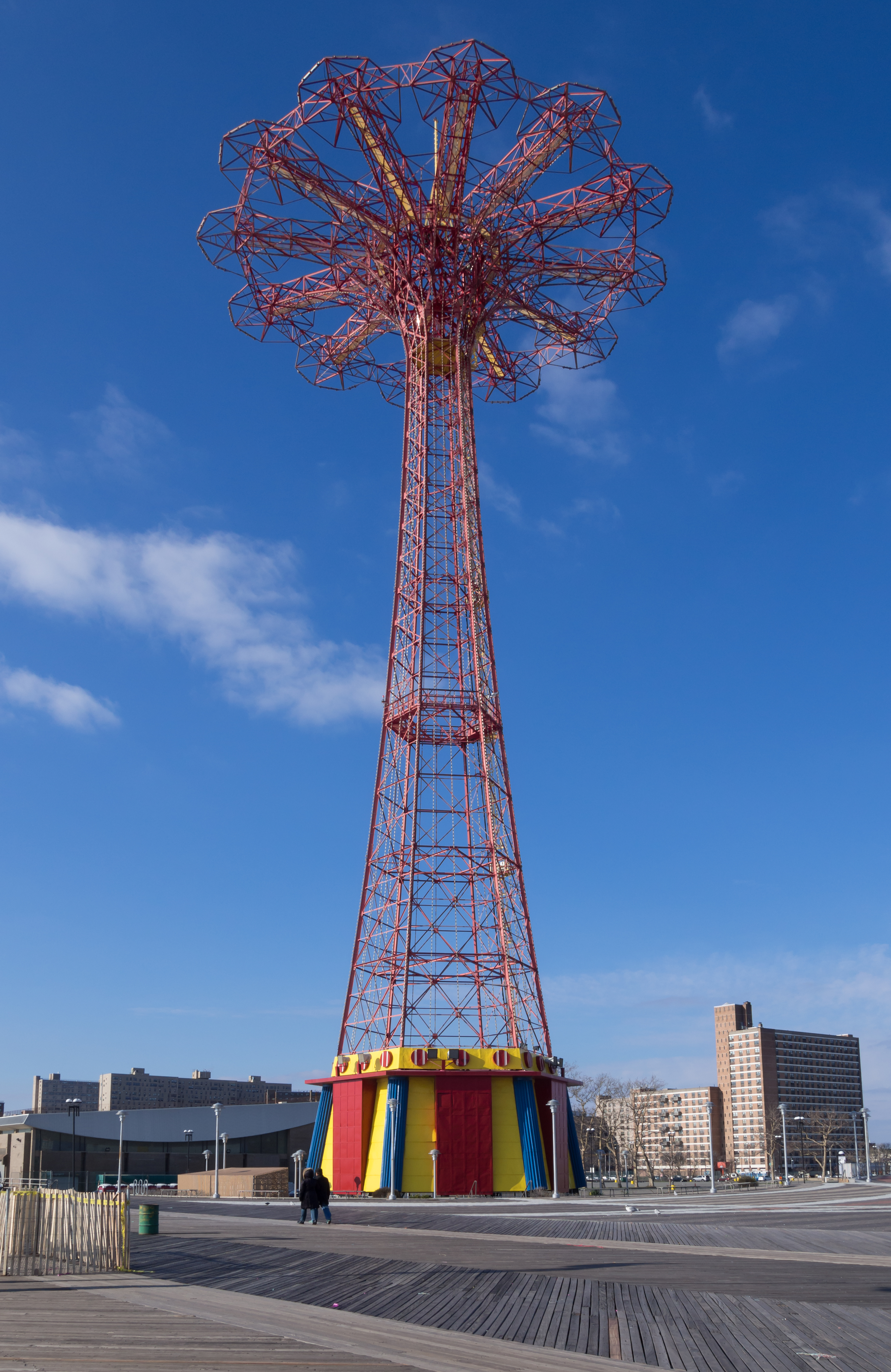
The Parachute Jump, acquired by Steeplechase from the 1939 New York World's Fair, still stands

The 1939 New York World's Fair in Flushing Meadows–Corona Park, several miles to the northeast of Coney Island, had created competition for Coney Island amusement parks, which saw sharply reduced attendance. Steeplechase's situation was exacerbated by the September 1939 fire, which had destroyed many of the larger attractions, including Flying Turns. After the World's Fair closed in 1940, the Tilyous purchased the fair's Parachute Jump, a parachute tower ride, and moved it to the former site of Flying Turns. The ride, inspired by a training device for paratroopers, opened in 1941 and contained 12 parachutes descending from a 250-foot-tall (76 m) tower. The Parachute Jump's installation was part of a reconstruction of an 800-foot (240 m) stretch of the Riegelmann Boardwalk. Other rides were added at Steeplechase in 1941, including rocket cars, a Whip ride, and the Silver Streak. The draft during World War II resulted in a shortage of qualified staff, and Onorato temporarily closed the Pavilion of Fun in 1945 due to the staff shortage. Only 70 people worked at Steeplechase that year, compared to 300 in a normal operating year; the park returned to normal staffing levels in 1946.

=== 1940s and 1950s: downfall ===
Despite the park's popularity with New Yorkers, many factors after the end of World War II would eventually lead to its decline, including frequent fires, low patronage, and white flight. Steeplechase's closest competitor, Luna Park, was heavily damaged by a pair of fires in 1944. Luna Park closed in 1946, leaving Steeplechase as the only major amusement park on Coney Island. Moreover, after Edward Tilyou died in 1944, control of the park was transferred to his siblings George Jr., Frank, Marie, and Eileen, who each owned a quarter share in the Steeplechase Corporation. The relationship between the siblings was fractious, and they often argued about Steeplechase's management.

In 1945, the Tilyou siblings leased out the boardwalk carousel to their cousin James J. McCullough. They rented out the pool in 1946; the pool's new operators instituted a season pass scheme that effectively locked out African Americans from using the pool, despite the fact that an increasing proportion of Steeplechase visitors was African-American. Park officials also discontinued the use of a flat admission fee and began selling tickets at three prices. The ballroom was also split in half to create a TV studio in 1947. The same year, the Tilyou siblings discontinued the combination ticket and started offering a pass where patrons could go on any 15 rides for one dollar. In practice, not many people bought the 15-ride pass, since various special-interest groups such as social, political, and religious organizations had designated days where they could visit Steeplechase Park for free. Steeplechase also saw its 20-millionth visitor that year. The Tilyous added extra rides for the 1948 season, including the Scrambler, the C-Cruise, and several children's rides. Onorato added a "lost kids' department" at the park in 1951 for children who had become separated from their guardians.

Steeplechase Park continued its downward trajectory with the demolition of several rides and structures and the neglect of others. The skating rink, now used only for the Tilyous' private functions, was demolished in December 1951. The following year, several structures on West 19th Street were demolished, as was the little-used Old Mill boat ride that ran under one of these structures; the site was filled by a parking lot in 1954. Other impediments included a 1953 flood and fire, which destroyed machinery; the death of the Tilyou siblings' mother in 1954, which caused further acrimony among the siblings; and the underpayment of employees, which was one of the main reasons Steeplechases' employees were mostly elderly citizens who could afford to take such a low wage. The park started becoming profitable again when Arthur Godfrey and His Friends started broadcasting from Steeplechase in 1955. After Steeplechase Pier was destroyed by fire in 1957, a larger replacement opened the next year. George Tilyou Jr. died in 1958, and his sister Marie took over as Steeplechase Corporation president the next year, demoting James Onorato to general manager. Marie, who had long wanted to change Steeplechase's image against the wishes of her brothers, began adding rides for the 1959 and 1960 seasons, such as a Tilt-a-Whirl, a Round Up ride, and a Paratrooper ride.

=== Demise ===
New York City parks commissioner Robert Moses was a longtime critic of Coney Island, describing the beach as so crowded that bathers had less room than in a coffin. As early as 1937, he had published a report about the possible redevelopment of Coney Island. Moses, who was also a New York City housing commissioner, rezoned the area for high-rise housing in the late 1940s. Subsequently, in 1953, Moses proposed that most of the peninsula be rezoned for various uses, claiming that it would be an "upgrade" over the various business and unrestricted zones that existed at the time. Steeplechase Park would be allowed to remain open, but much of the shorefront amusements and concessions would be replaced by residential developments.

At the time, Coney Island was seeing fewer visitors year-over-year. Crime increases, insufficient parking facilities, bad weather, and the post-World War II automotive boom were cited as contributing factors in the decrease of visitors to Coney Island. The start of the 1964 New York World's Fair, also in Flushing Meadows–Corona Park, was another factor. Ironically, prior to the World's Fair, Steeplechase Park was seeing record high patronage; the highest single-day visitor count, over 18,000 customers, was recorded in 1961. Nevertheless, it also faced problems of its own: a severe assault of an employee in 1961 forced the closure of the Insanitorium, while Marie Tilyou was opposed to her nephew Frank II's proposal to bring rides from the Century 21 Exposition to the park. Further, Steeplechase had been leasing one-third of its land from the Huber family, which decided to sell that land in 1962. More attractions were destroyed in a 1963 fire, which razed two blocks on Steeplechase's west side. High crime was also rampant; for instance, a mass shooting nearby in 1962 resulted in three people being killed, and visitors were generally afraid of being attacked by residents of nearby public housing projects. By 1964, the area had seen its lowest number of patrons in a quarter-century. The Tilyou family was paying $120,000 annually in taxes.

By the early 1960s, the children of George C. Tilyou were themselves aging; his last surviving son, Frank, died in 1964. The shares of Steeplechase Park were now held by four women—Marie, Eileen, and the respective widows of Frank and George Jr.—all of whom had differing visions for the park. Steeplechase Park closed for the season on September 20, 1964, for what would be the last time. Though no official closure announcement was made, rumors of a sale started circulating in February 1965. Developer Fred Trump bought the property for $2.5 million on July 1, 1965, and announced his intention to build luxury apartments on the old Steeplechase property. Though the sale was opposed by the Coney Island Chamber of Commerce, it was consistent with the area's gradual conversion into a residential community. At the time of its closure, Steeplechase Park was Coney Island's longest-lasting attraction; it had outlasted the original park's steeplechase attractions by more than a half-century.

== Later use of the site ==
=== Trump ownership and Kaufman operation ===
==== 1960s ====
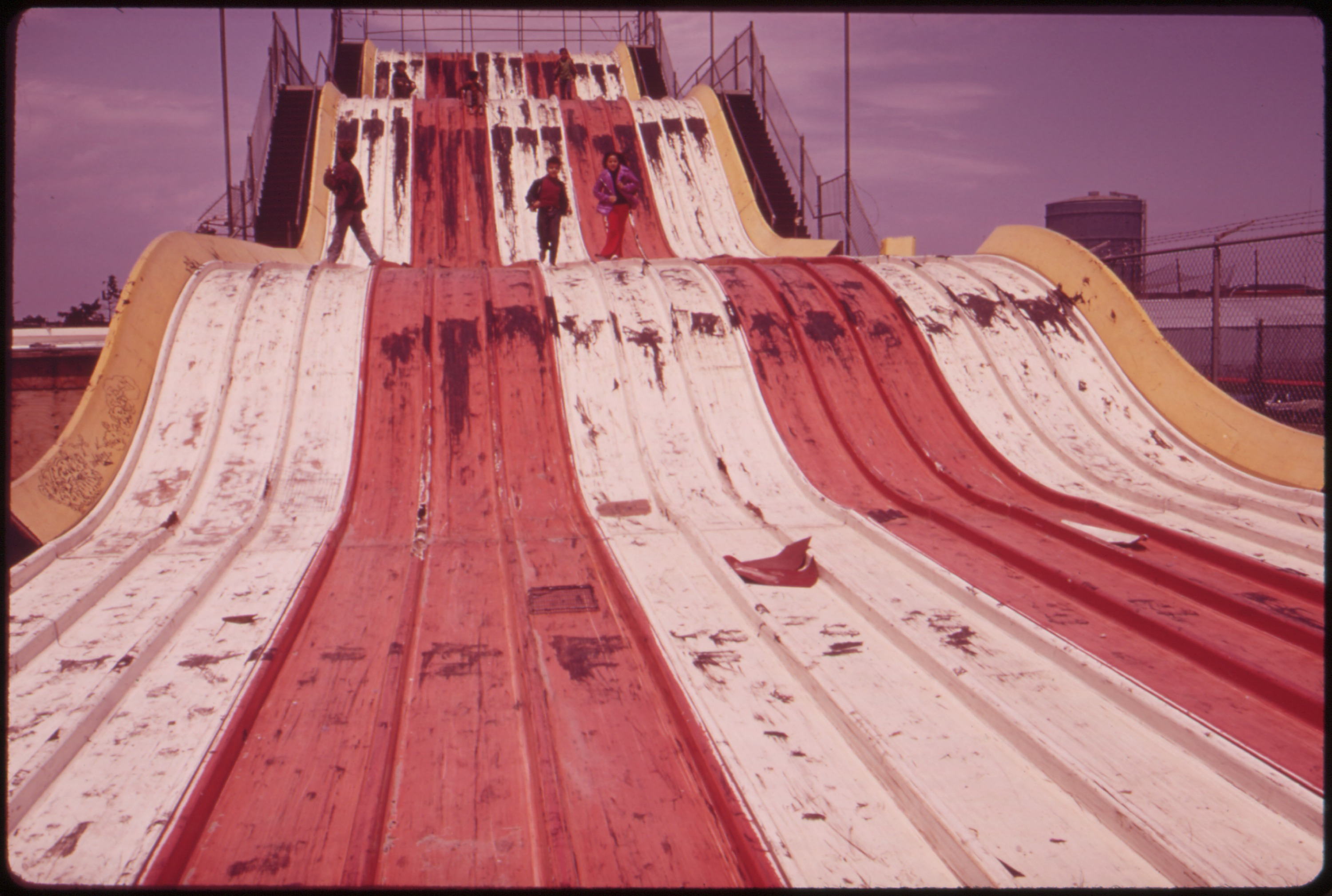
A 1973 photo of an abandoned "Giant Slide" that had been set up for a few years on the old Steeplechase site

Trump demolished Steeplechase Park's Pavilion of Fun during a highly publicized ceremony in September 1966. At the demolition, he was said to have sold bricks to ceremony guests to smash the remaining glass windows on the Pavilion of Fun. Trump supposedly destroyed the pavilion to circumvent a landmark law being proposed by the city following the demolition of the old Pennsylvania Station in 1963. Mechanical horses from Steeplechase Park were sold to a park in Dania Beach, Florida, while the El Dorado Carousel was first placed into storage in New Jersey and then sent to Japan. On part of Steeplechase Park's site, Trump proposed building a 160-foot-high (49 m) enclosed dome with recreational facilities and a convention center, designed by Morris Lapidus. Brooklyn borough president Abe Stark supported the proposal, while the Coney Island Chamber of Commerce opposed the plans, saying the proposed dome was too small to accommodate recreational uses. Trump wanted to build four 30-story apartment towers, with a total of 3,000 apartments, on the remainder of the site.

The Coney Island Chamber of Commerce submitted plans to Stark for a 12.5-acre (5.1 ha) resort on Steeplechase Park's site in December 1965. In October 1966, the city announced its plans to acquire the former park so that the land could be reserved for recreational use. Although residents supported the city's action, Trump called the city's proposal "wasteful". The New York City Planning Commission rezoned the Steeplechase site for recreational use around 1967. The same year, Trump started leasing the property to Norman Kaufman, who operated fairground amusements on a corner of the site, calling his amusement park "Steeplechase Park". Kaufman and his partner Irving Vichinsky operated 53 rides, including three roller coasters.

New York City parks commissioner August Heckscher II proposed in January 1968 that the New York state government build an "open-space" state park on the Steeplechase site, and the New York City Board of Estimate voted that May in favor of funding to buy the land from Trump. Condemnation of the site started in 1969. The city ultimately purchased the proposed park's site for $4 million, with partial funding from the federal government. As a condition of the deal, the sale or lease of the future parkland required permission from the New York State Legislature, thus blocking Trump from developing the site as apartments.

==== 1970s and early 1980s ====
Trump filed a series of court cases related to the proposed residential rezoning and ultimately won a $1.3 million judgment. After the city acquired the land, Kaufman began leasing the site from the city in 1970. The city also leased out the boardwalk and parking lot sites at extremely low rates, which resulted in a $1 million loss of revenue over the following seven years. Since the city wanted to build the state park on the site of Kaufman's Steeplechase Park, it attempted to evict him by refusing to grant a lease extension. The city government first tried to evict Kaufman by refusing to give licenses to any of his rides, but Kaufman continued to operate rides there, even after one of his employees died in 1974. A state judge granted the city the right to evict Kaufman in December 1974 but ruled that Kaufman could stay through the 1975 season.

NYC Parks was supposed to have devised a plan for the proposed state park in 1969, but it never did so. Under the terms of Kaufman's lease, the city could evict him with 30 days' notice once it had devised a plan for a park. Due to the city's inaction, in 1975, the United States Department of Housing and Urban Development nearly withdrew a proposed grant of $2 million for the park. The city ultimately accepted the grant. In early 1977, city officials again attempted to evict Kaufman and force him to pay back rent, but a state judge rejected these claims. That June, the city's parks commissioner suggested that the city would redevelop the original Steeplechase Park's site as an amusement area instead of an open-air state park and proposed that the city return the grant. This move was opposed by the chairman of the New York City Planning Commission, who wanted to use the grant to pay for pedestrian walkways at the Steeplechase site.

In 1977 and 1978, Kaufman withheld rent payments to the city because of the ongoing litigation, and he sued the city for $1.7 million. By 1979, Kaufman had expanded his park and had plans to eventually rebuild the historic Steeplechase Park. He had also bought back the original Steeplechase horse ride with plans to install it the following season. Kaufman continued to operate the site until the end of summer 1980. In June 1981, the city paid Kaufman a million dollars for the rides, even though the amusements were estimated to be worth much less than that. However, the city had finally succeeded in evicting Kaufman from the property.

=== Development as stadium ===
In the mid-1980s, restaurant mogul Horace Bullard proposed rebuilding Steeplechase Park. He had already bought several acres of property just east of the Steeplechase Park site, including the site of the defunct Thunderbolt coaster and the lots west of the Abe Stark rink, and planned to spend $20 million just on cleaning up the neighborhood. He called for using the property, bounded by West 15th and West 19th Streets between Surf Avenue and the Boardwalk, to build a $55 million amusement park based on the original. The city agreed, and the project was approved in 1985. Bullard planned to open the park by mid-1986 to coincide with the Statue of Liberty's centennial celebration. The project was delayed while the New York City Planning Commission compiled an environmental impact report. The New York City Council and the State Legislature also had to agree to lease some of the land to Bullard, but the legislative bodies did not give their approval until mid-1986. By early 1987, the cost of the amusement park had nearly doubled to $100 million. The city government gave final approval to Bullard's plans in 1989, at which point the park was supposed to cost $250 million and open in May 1992.

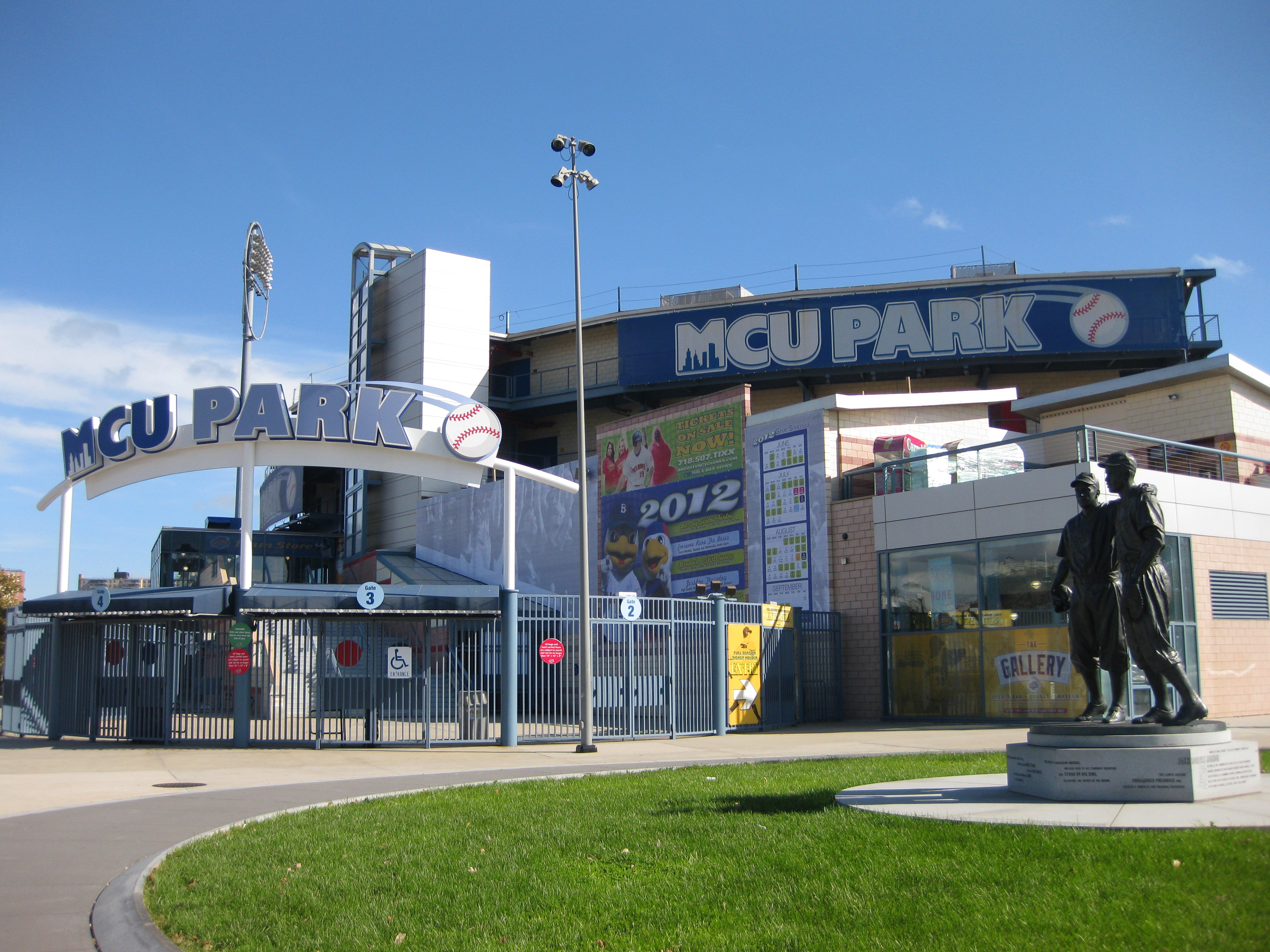
Maimonides Park, a minor-league baseball stadium built on the Steeplechase site in 2001. At the time of the photo, the stadium was known as MCU Park.

Concurrently, in December 1986, the New York State Urban Development Corporation formally proposed the construction of a $58 million, 17,000-seat minor-league baseball stadium near the site. State senator Thomas Bartosiewicz attempted to block Bullard from building on the Steeplechase site, as he was part of an organization that had promised another developer, Sportsplex, the right to build an amateur sports arena on the site. Construction was held up for another four years as Bullard and Sportsplex fought over the site.

After Rudy Giuliani took office as mayor of New York in 1994, he negated the Bullard deal by approving the construction of a minor-league baseball stadium on the site allotted for Steeplechase Park. In 1998, Giuliani had canceled Sportsplex and the entertainment complex, and instead unveiled another plan where only the parking lot would be built. The minor league team was called the Brooklyn Cyclones. Bullard, now no longer rebuilding Steeplechase Park, had wanted to restore the Thunderbolt as part of a scaled-down amusement park. Giuliani had the coaster demolished on the grounds that the Thunderbolt was about to collapse, though the coaster's destruction took weeks. In 2000, the city approved the $31 million Keyspan Park (now Maimonides Park), which used funds from the canceled Sportsplex. The 6,500-seat minor-league baseball stadium opened the following year, in conjunction with the Brooklyn Cyclones' inaugural season in 2001.

== Current status ==
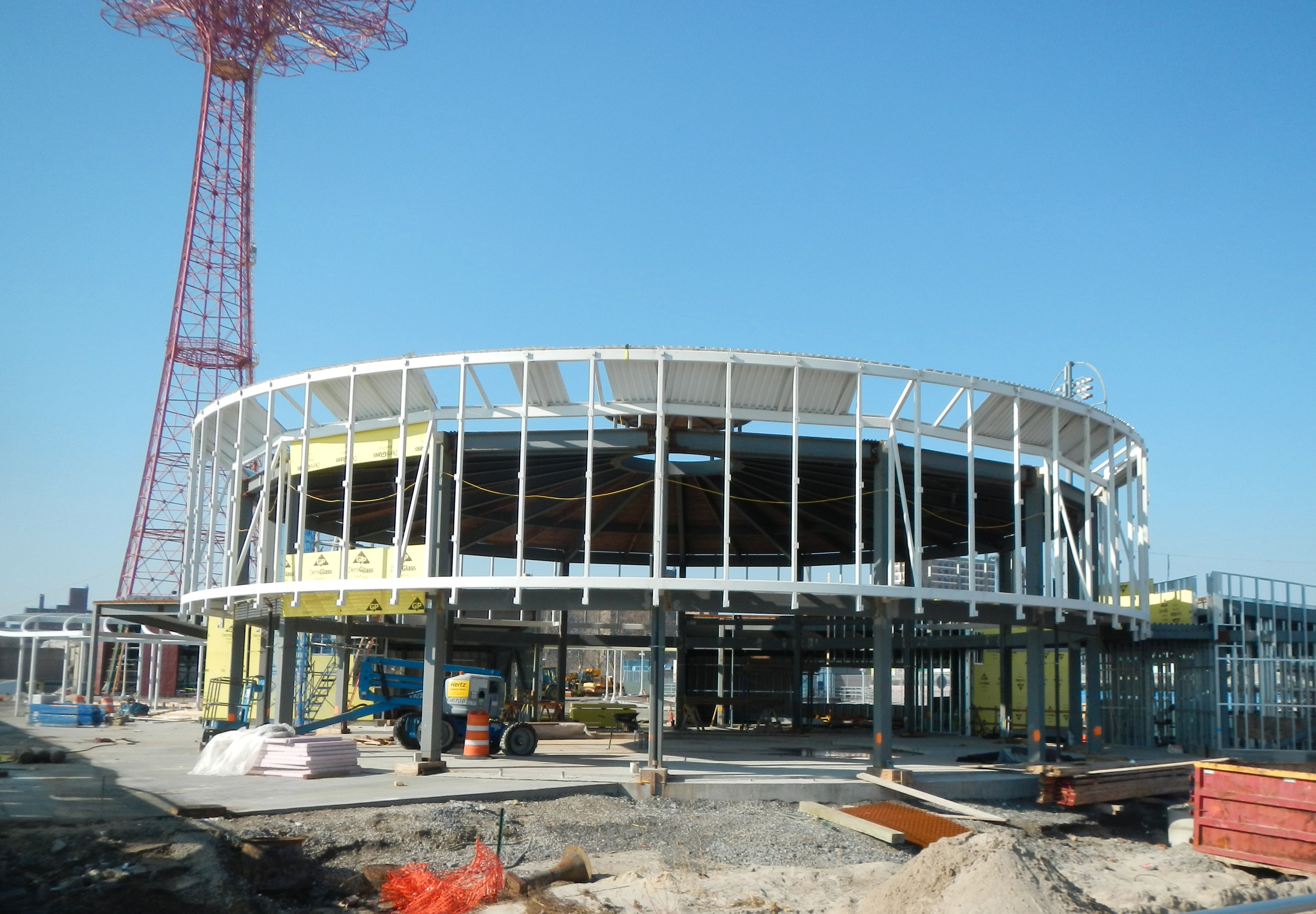
B&B Carousell under construction at new Steeplechase Plaza

Much of the former Steeplechase Park site is occupied by Maimonides Park. The New York City Department of Parks and Recreation owns the 10 acres (4.0 ha) land under Maimonides Park and maintains it as "Steeplechase Park". A public plaza on the boardwalk is located to the south of Maimonides Park and operated by NYC Parks.

In November 2011, work started on a 2.2-acre (0.89 ha) site around the Parachute Jump, to be called Steeplechase Plaza. The city also announced that the historic B&B Carousell, which had been stored at the Brooklyn Army Terminal since 2005, would be relocated to Steeplechase Plaza within Luna Park. The carousel opened in 2013 at the Steeplechase Plaza section of Luna Park, near the former site of Steeplechase Park. The carousel was placed on the National Register of Historic Places in 2016. The plaza is adjacent to Thunderbolt, a steel coaster that opened in 2014 on the site of the original wooden Thunderbolt.

The only structure still standing that was once part of Steeplechase is the Parachute Jump. It had been proposed for demolition in the mid-20th century. Due to the expense involved in destruction, the ride outlived the remainder of the park, operating until 1964. Still too expensive to tear down, the tower was made a New York City designated landmark in 1977. Three months later the New York City Board of Estimate overturned the landmark designation, citing doubts about the tower's structural integrity. In 1980, the Parachute Jump was placed on the National Register of Historic Places, and in 1989, the Parachute Jump was once again recognized as a city landmark.
