= B&B Carousell =

Carousel in Brooklyn, New York

- U.S. National Register of Historic Places
- New York State Register of Historic Places
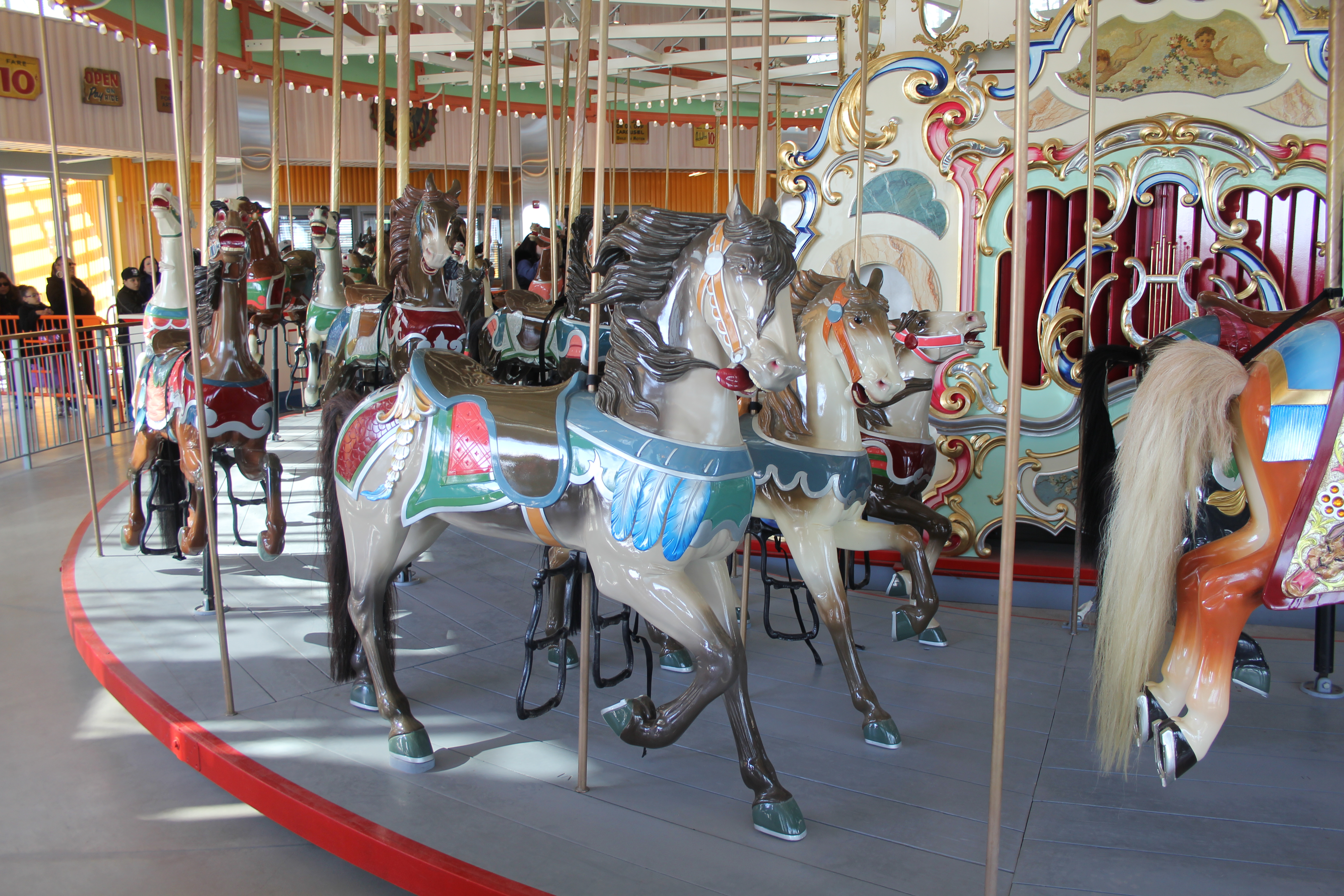
- The carousel's multicolored horses, restored in 2008–2013

- Location within New York City
- Location: 1615 Boardwalk, Brooklyn, NY
- Coordinates: 40.5731°N 73.9832°W
- Built: c. 1906–1909; 117 years ago
- Architects: William F. Mangels, Marcus Illions
- NRHP reference No.: 16000035
- NYSRHP No.: 04701.018809

Significant dates
- Added to NRHP: February 23, 2016
- Designated NYSRHP: December 30, 2015

The B&B Carousell is a historic carousel at Coney Island in Brooklyn, New York City. It was built by Coney Island-based manufacturer William F. Mangels c. 1906–1909, with wooden horses carved by Marcus Illions. The carousel has been relocated and refurbished several times over its history. The B&B Carousell has been located in Luna Park since 2013.

The "Carousell" in the attraction's name is derived from the way Mangels's brochures spelled the word, while the "B&B" refers to William Bishoff and Herman Brienstein, the owners who moved it back to Coney Island from New Jersey. Charles Carmel crafted replacement horses for the B&B Carousell in 1927, and August Wolfinger painted murals on the carousel's rounding boards in the 1940s. It is the last operating carousel in Coney Island, and in 2016, it was listed on the National Register of Historic Places.

== Description ==
=== Site and exterior ===
The B&B Carousell is bordered by Riegelmann Boardwalk to the south, West 16th Street to the east, and MCU Park to the west and north. The Thunderbolt roller coaster is located just east of the carousel. The B&B Carousell is located inside a cylindrical building pavilion, which was built between 2011 and 2013 when the carousel was relocated to Luna Park. A large sign with the word "Carousell" is hung near the top of the building's exterior. The rounding boards, which are the panels located on the top of the carousel building's exterior, contain painted depictions of motifs representing the United States, such as the United States Flag, the bald eagle, Abraham Lincoln, and the Statue of Liberty.

=== Interior ===
==== Horses and chariots ====
The carousel consists of fifty horses and two chariots. There are 18 "sections" of horses connected to spokes that revolve around the center of the carousel. Sixteen of the sections each contain three horses located side by side. Thirty-six of the horses, within twelve of the eighteen sections, can move up and down. These horses are connected to brass poles with spiral-groove designs, which in turn are connected to the cranking rods at the top of each section, which rotate when the carousel is in motion. Fourteen of the horses, as well as both chariots, do not move. Twelve of the stationary horses are spread across four sections. The other two stationary horses are located side by side with each of the chariots, which take up the space normally occupied by two horses. The stationary horses are also connected to poles, which are connected to stationary rods at the top of each section.

The original horses were created by carousel-horse carver Marcus Illions, but most of them were replaced by carvings from Charles Carmel in 1927. The horses and chariots are installed on a rotating wooden platform, with its inner and outer edges painted red. The sizes of the horses vary: the largest horses are located on the outside, while the smallest horses are located on the inside. Each of the horses is designed with different motifs and colors, and appear in "a variety of dramatic poses". The lead horse stands alone, and the pole connected to the lead horse contains a plaque stating: "Abraham Lincoln Centennial Horse. Riders Not Permitted. Built by MC Illions. 1909." To celebrate Abraham Lincoln's 100th birthday in 1908, Illions had carved four horses for different carousels. This particular horse was originally installed on the Stubbman Carousel in 1908. It is the only horse originally carved by Illions that is still in situ on the B&B Carousell.

==== Frame ====
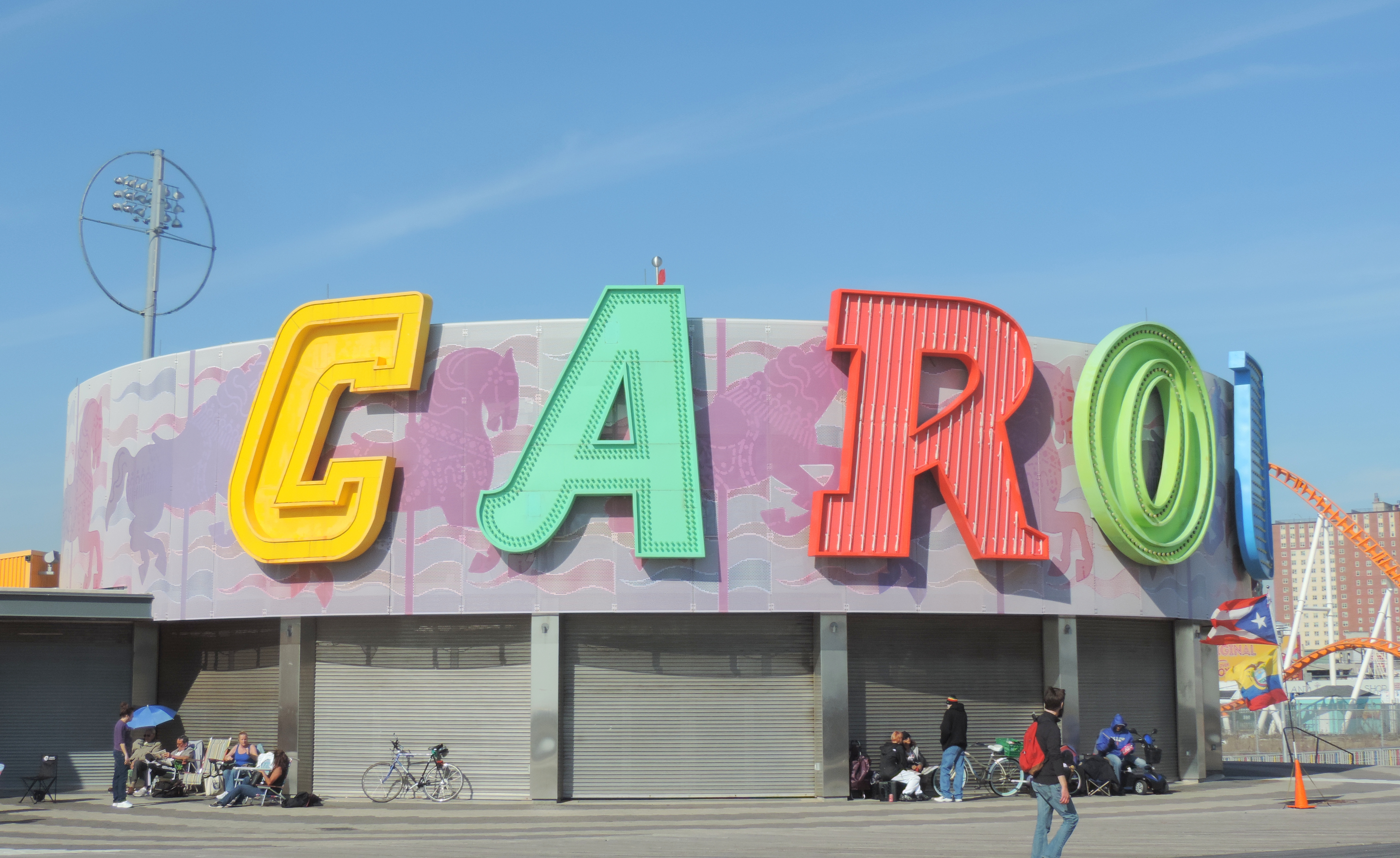
The exterior of the B&B Carousell building as seen from the Riegelmann Boardwalk during the offseason.

The carousel frame was built by William F. Mangels. The center of the carousel contains a large pole, which is hidden by a fairground organ on one side and gold-framed mirrors on the other three sides. The organ was built by Gerbruder-Bruder and imported from Germany around 1917. It was originally a 69-key organ before the Brooklyn-based B.A.B. Organ Company refurbished it into a 66-key instrument in the 1930s, and is one of three such organs in known existence. For a time after the carousel opened, outsiders could try to grab the single brass ring in order to gain a free ride. The brass ring was later removed for monetary reasons, though onlookers could still grab steel rings.

The carousel's sweeps—horizontal beams under the roof that connect to the center pole and to poles bolted to the outer edge of the rotating wooden platform—are painted white. The sweeps, which radiate from the center, are held together by a series of cross sweeps, which run in a polygonal shape around the center of the carousel. These cross sweeps also have colored flower designs.

== History ==
The B&B Carousell is one of more than two dozen carousels that have operated on Coney Island throughout the area's history. In Coney Island's heyday, it contained up to a dozen carousels at a time, and there were four wooden carousels on Surf Avenue alone. By the late 1880s, the first carousel manufacturers had opened in Coney Island, and by the early 1900s, the island had several carousels. There was even a "Coney Island" style of carousel horses.

=== Early history ===
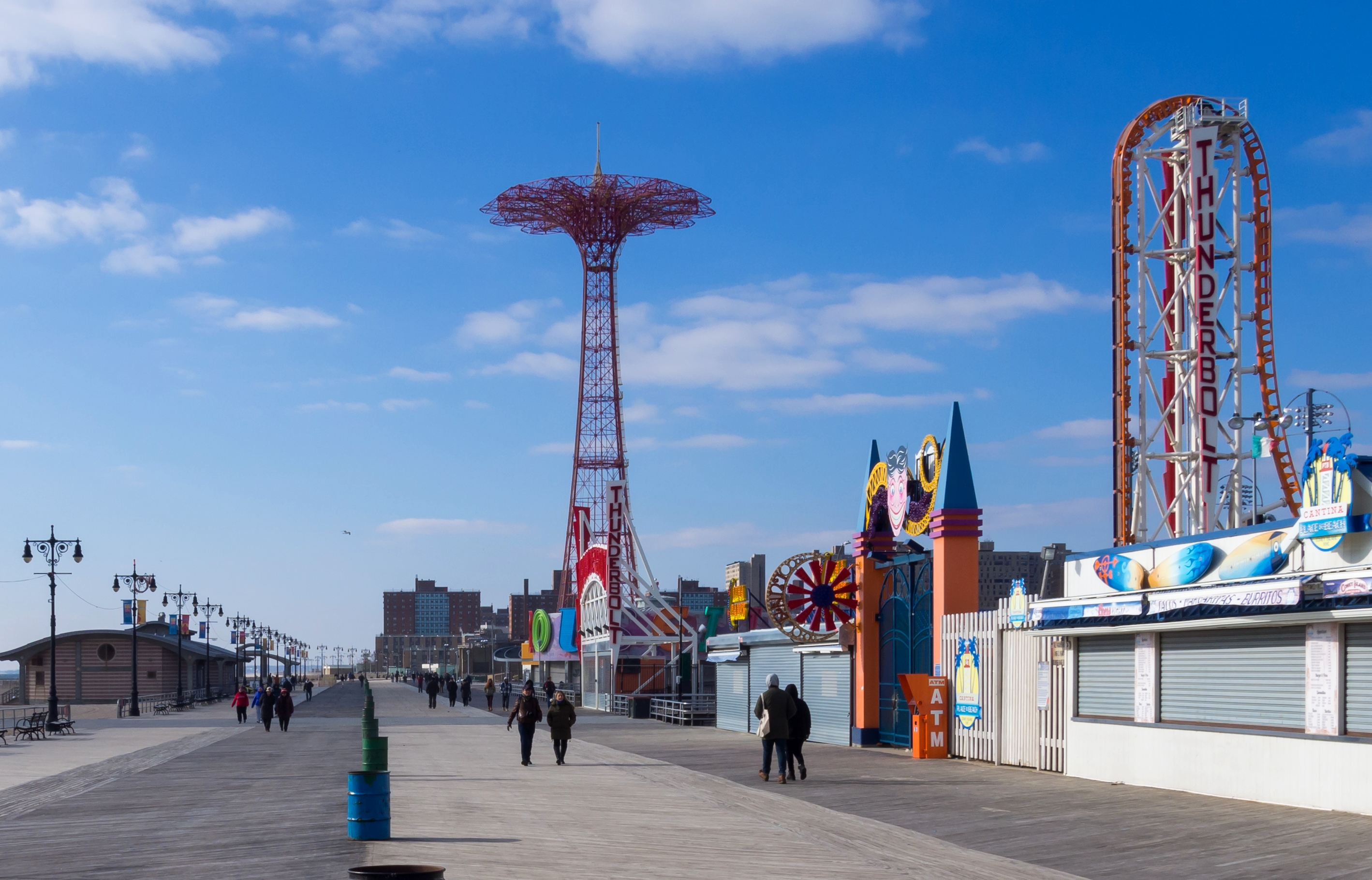
View looking west from Riegelmann Boardwalk; the B&B Carousell is the structure with the multicolored sign at bottom center, just behind the sign for the Thunderbolt roller coaster. The Parachute Jump can be seen in the background, behind the carousel building.

Mangels and Illions constructed the B&B Carousell at Coney Island between 1906 and 1909. The carousel was initially located in New Jersey; it was likely first installed at Asbury Park, then moved to Lake Hopatcong in 1927. Around the same time that the carousel was relocated to Lake Hopatcong, Charles Carmel carved the two chariots, as well as replacements for most of Illions's horses. In 1932, the carousel was sold to William Bishoff and Herman Brienstein. The "B&B" in the carousel's name refers to Bishoff and Brienstein, and "Carousell" is the spelling used in Mangels's catalogs.

The carousel was moved back to Coney Island by 1934–1935, and was sited at 1043 Surf Avenue near West 12th Street. Five years later, the carousel was moved to another location on Surf Avenue. In the 1940s, August Wolfinger was commissioned to paint the carousel's rounding boards.

Coney Island's allure as an amusement area began to wane in the 1960s and 1970s. James McCullough and Mike Saltzstein purchased the B&B Carousell in 1973. By 1979, it was one of the last remaining carousels in the city. By that time, a single ride on the carousel cost 50 cents. When Saltzstein died in 2001, the B&B Carousell was the only remaining amusement attraction on Coney Island located north of Surf Avenue. Out of the 2,000 to 3,000 wooden carousels produced between 1880 and 1930, the B&B Carousell was one of about 175 that remained.

=== Restoration ===
Shortly before Saltzstein's death, the land under the B&B Carousell had been purchased by developer Joe Sitt. After Saltzstein's death, McCullough found it difficult to continuing operating the attraction, and Sitt evicted McCullough once the lease on the carousel expired. The carousel was proposed to be auctioned off. In 2005, a private donor purchased the carousel and gave it to the government of New York City, which stored the carousel at Brooklyn Army Terminal. Starting in 2008, the horses of the B&B Carousell were restored by carousel restorer Todd W. Goings in Marion, Ohio. According to The New York Times, the restoration involved synthesizing and applying more than 80 colors that most closely matched the horses' original tones, using brushes made of several animals' natural bristle. The final part of the restoration included new horsehair tails for the 50 horses. The New York City Economic Development Corporation paid $1,700,000 for the restoration.

In 2011, the city announced that the B&B Carousell would be reinstalled at Steeplechase Plaza within Luna Park. It reopened there in 2013, near the former site of Steeplechase Park. The B&B Carousell was listed on the National Register of Historic Places in 2016. It is Coney Island's last operating carousel.

== See also ==
- Amusement rides on the National Register of Historic Places
- Flushing Meadows Carousel, another NRHP-listed carousel with Illions horses, located at Flushing Meadows–Corona Park in Queens
- National Register of Historic Places listings in Brooklyn
