= Luna Park (Coney Island) =

Luna Park may refer to one of two parks located in Coney Island:

- Luna Park (Coney Island, 1903)
- Luna Park (Coney Island, 2010)
