= Dreamland (Coney Island, 2009) =

Former amusement park in Brooklyn, New York

Coordinates: 40.5740°N 73.9784°W

Dreamland was an amusement park in Coney Island, Brooklyn, New York City that operated at the site of the defunct Astroland park for the 2009 season. It was replaced with a new Luna Park the following year.

The park was operated by Anthony Raffaele for Thor Equities. The park contained two large freak shows as well as independent attractions to see a giant snake, a giant rat (really a baby capybara), and a tiny woman. It also included a carousel, a scrambler, and other rides.

Thor Equities shut the park down before the end of the 2009 season because the operators had accumulated $600,000 in unpaid back rent. Thor locked the operators out in the middle of the night without a formal eviction.
