= Luna Park (Coney Island, 2010) =

Amusement park in Brooklyn, New York

- Interactive map of Luna Park
- Location: Coney Island, Brooklyn, New York, United States
- Coordinates: 40.573972°N 73.978479°W
- Status: Operating
- Public transit: New York City Subway: Coney Island–Stillwell Avenue West Eighth Street–New York Aquarium; NYCT Bus: B36, B64, B68, B74, B82, X28, X38
- Opened: May 29, 2010
- Owner: Zamperla
- Operated by: Central Amusement International, LLC
- General manager: Fernando Velasquez
- Operating season: April–October
- Area: 14.5-acre (59,000 m^{2})

Attractions
- Total: 28
- Roller coasters: 6
- Website: Official website

Luna Park is an amusement park in Coney Island, Brooklyn, New York City. It opened on May 29, 2010, at the site of Astroland, an amusement park that had been in operation from 1962 to 2008, and Dreamland, which operated at the same site for the 2009 season. It was named after the original 1903 Luna Park which operated until 1944 on a site just north of the current park's 1000 Surf Avenue location.

The park was designed, developed, and operated by Central Amusement International, LLC (CAI), a subsidiary of the Italian company Zamperla which built 19 new mechanical rides for the park. There are also interactive games, food and beverage concessions, and live entertainment.

As of 2017, the park's general manager is Fernando Velasquez.

== History ==
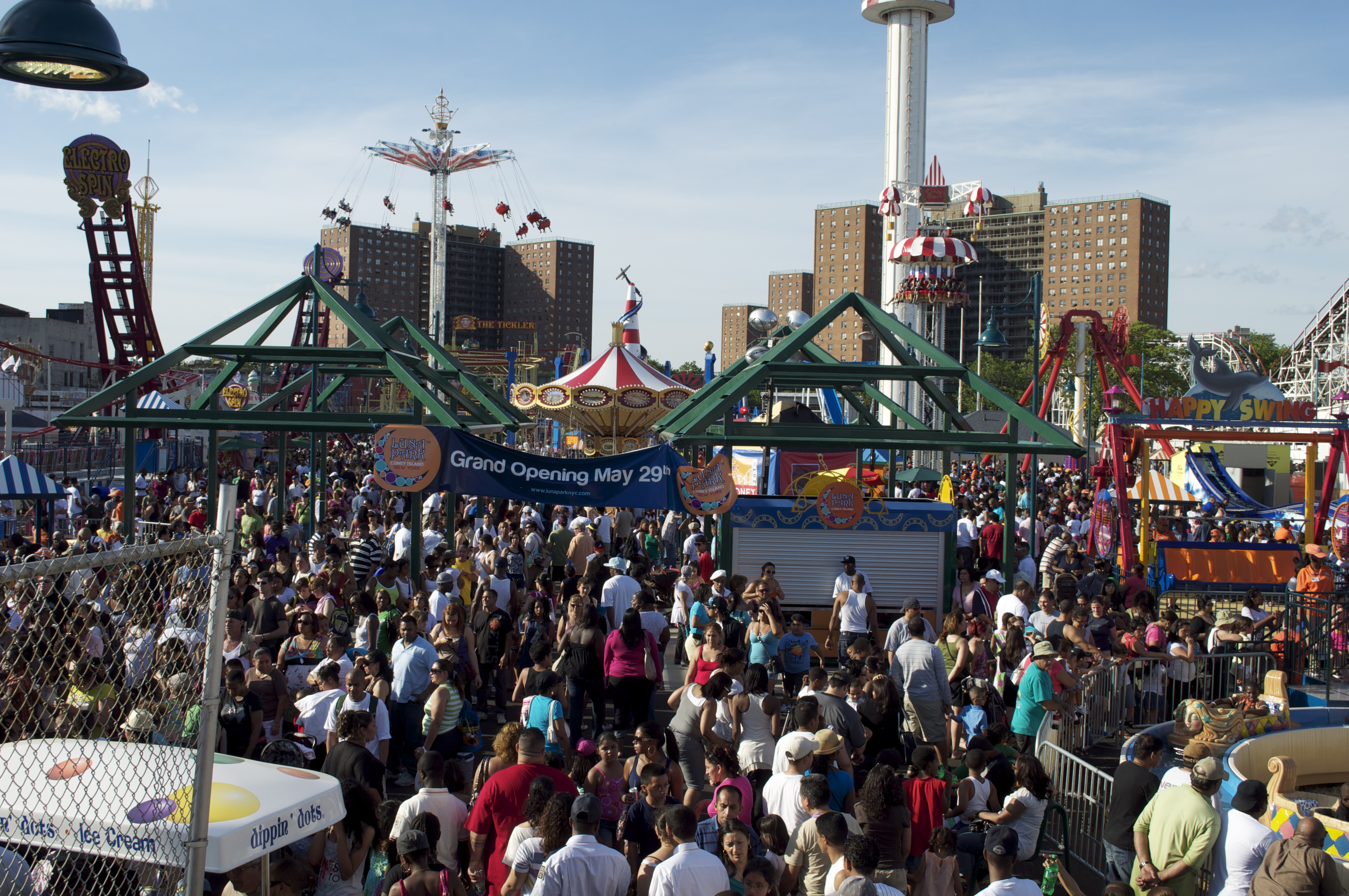
Luna Park during its opening weekend in 2010

In September 2003, Mayor Michael Bloomberg, the New York City Council and Brooklyn Borough President Marty Markowitz formed the Coney Island Development Corporation (CIDC). The corporation released the "Coney Island Revitalization Plan" in 2005, which laid out its plan to preserve and grow the historic amusement area. At the end of the 2008 season, the Coney Island Astroland amusement park closed. In 2009, a traveling carnival operated amusement rides on the Astroland site, renaming it Dreamland.

=== Opening and early years ===
On February 16, 2010, New York City Mayor Michael Bloomberg announced the winning bid to develop and operate an amusement park to be constructed on the 3.16-acre (12,800 m^{2}) former site of Astroland in Coney Island would be awarded to Zamperla/Central Amusement International under a 10-year lease.

The new Luna Park was widely advertised across New York City in posters, billboards, and advertisements on the side of public buses as part of an advertisement for the attractions at Coney Island. The ads boasted the punchlines "Thrill is nothing without speed", referring to the various thrill rides at the park and "The FUN is back at Coney Island" referring to the Coney Island restoration project. The park opened on May 29, 2010. Besides the new rides brought in by Zamperla, many older rides from Astroland were incorporated into Luna Park. These included the old park's centerpiece, "Astrotower", which was not operational; another inherited ride was the landmarked Cyclone roller coaster, which was leased out to Astroland in 1975. Some of the other old spaced themed elements were incorporated into the amusement areas.

On July 2, 2013, Luna Park was evacuated as a precaution due to a problem with the Astrotower swaying; part of the attraction remained closed over the Fourth of July, and it had been demolished by July 6. In May 2014, the Thunderbolt steel coaster opened at Luna Park; it was named after the 1925 coaster that had been demolished in 2000.

=== Expansion ===
In August 2018, the New York City Economic Development Corporation and the New York City Department of Parks and Recreation announced that Luna Park would be expanded. The new rides would be located on a 150,000-square-foot (14,000 m^{2}) city-operated parcel between West 15th and West 16th Streets, next to the new Thunderbolt coaster. The rides would include a 40-foot-high (12 m) log flume called the Super Flume, as well as a circus themed zip-line and a ropes course called "Sky Chaser", a family coaster, and possibly a water drop tower. that were originally scheduled to open in 2020. There would also be a public plaza and an amusement arcade within the newly expanded amusement area. The expansion would enlarge the park by 50 percent and were expected to add 100 jobs.

These construction projects were placed on hold in early 2020 with the COVID-19 pandemic in New York City. Alessandro Zamperla, president of Luna Park's owner Central Amusement International, stated in mid-2020 that he hoped to have these rides open in 2021. The park reopened for the 2021 season, and the expansion started in October 2021. Luna Park officials announced in 2022 that the roller coaster would be named Tony's Express, after Alessandro's grandfather Antonio, while the log flume would be named Leti's Treasure, after his grandmother Letizia. The new rides were still under construction at the end of the 2022 season. Four of the new rides opened in June 2023.

== Description ==
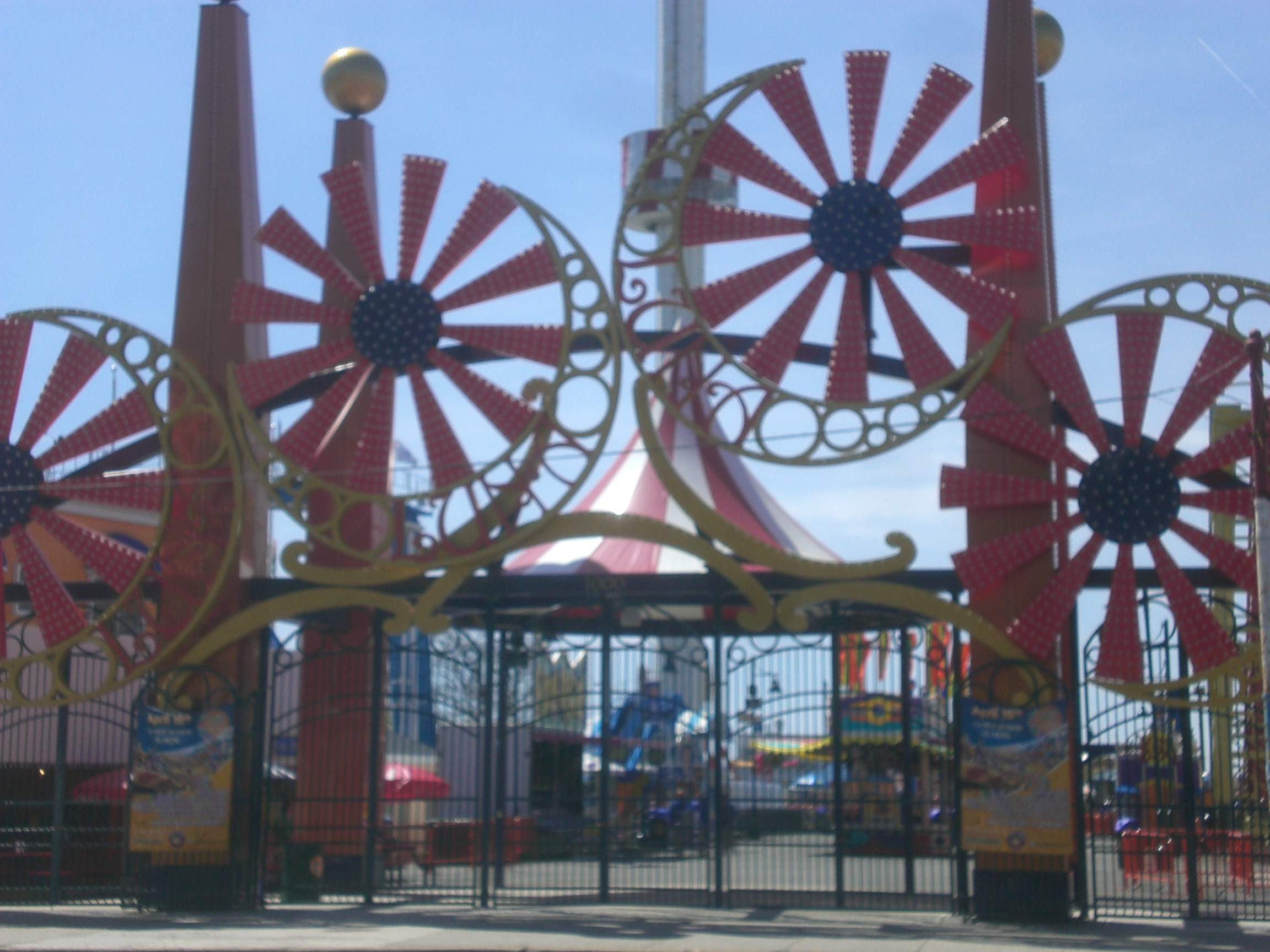
Luna Park entrance

Luna Park's entrance is patterned after the entrance to the original 1903 Luna Park and was built on the ground of the former Astroland amusement park. It has 19 new attractions and games. It is the only area on Coney Island where the use of cash to pay for amusements and rides is not allowed; visitors must buy Luna Cards and spend Luna Credits or use an unlimited ride wristband that allows four hours of ride time on select rides. Variations of the Coney Island "Funny Face" logo can be seen throughout the park. The logo, from the early days of George C. Tilyou's Steeplechase Park, was created about 100 years ago. It has featured in TV shows such as Law & Order and Mr. Robot.

=== Attractions ===
Luna Park has 36 attractions designed and manufactured by Zamperla. Luna Park also operates the Coney Island Cyclone, an official city and national landmark. Six rides, including some from the former Victorian Gardens Amusement Park, were placed in the area where the Wild River was located for the 2021 season.

==== Thrill Rides ====
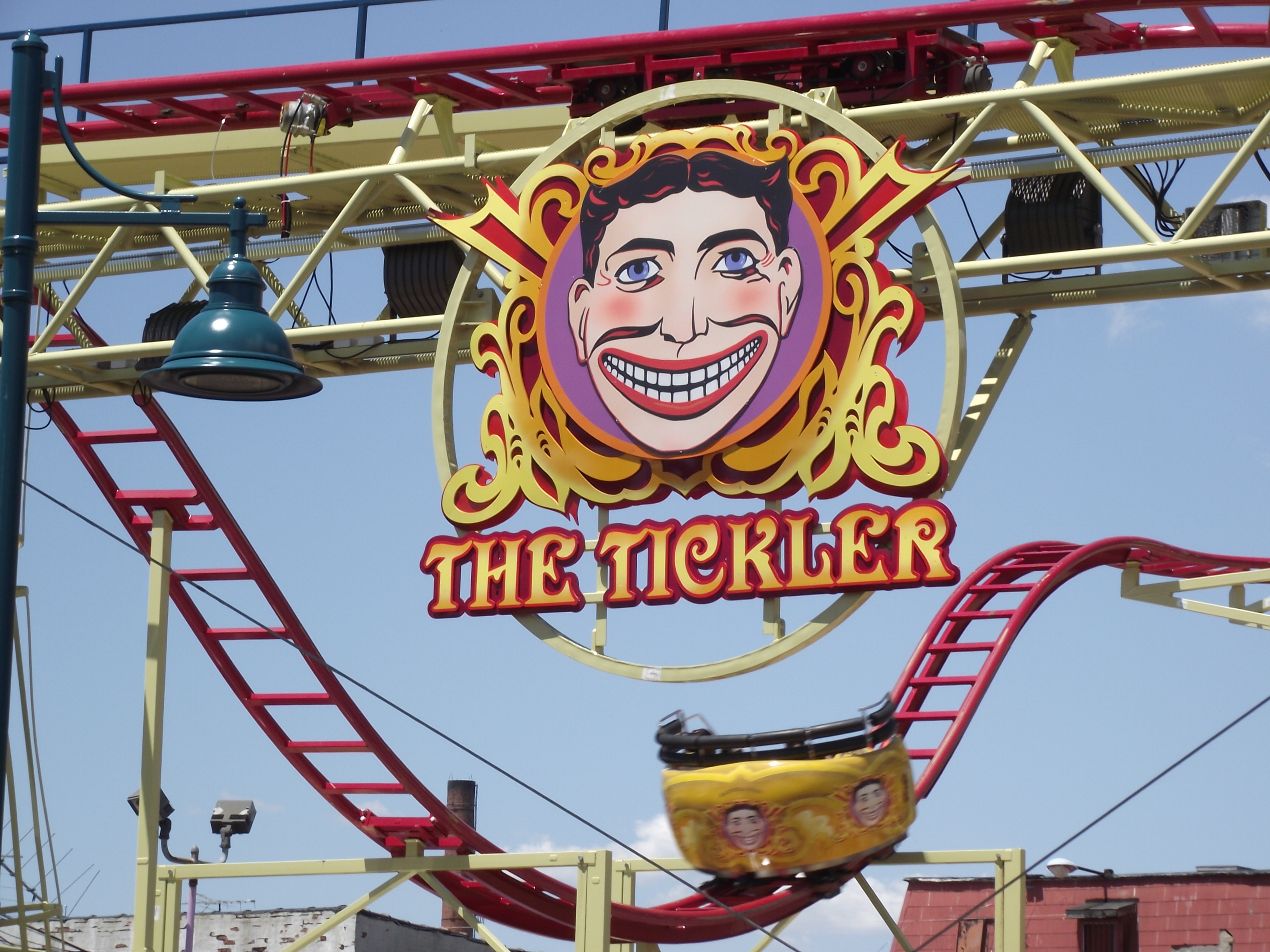
The Tickler ride with the Coney Island "Funny Face" logo.

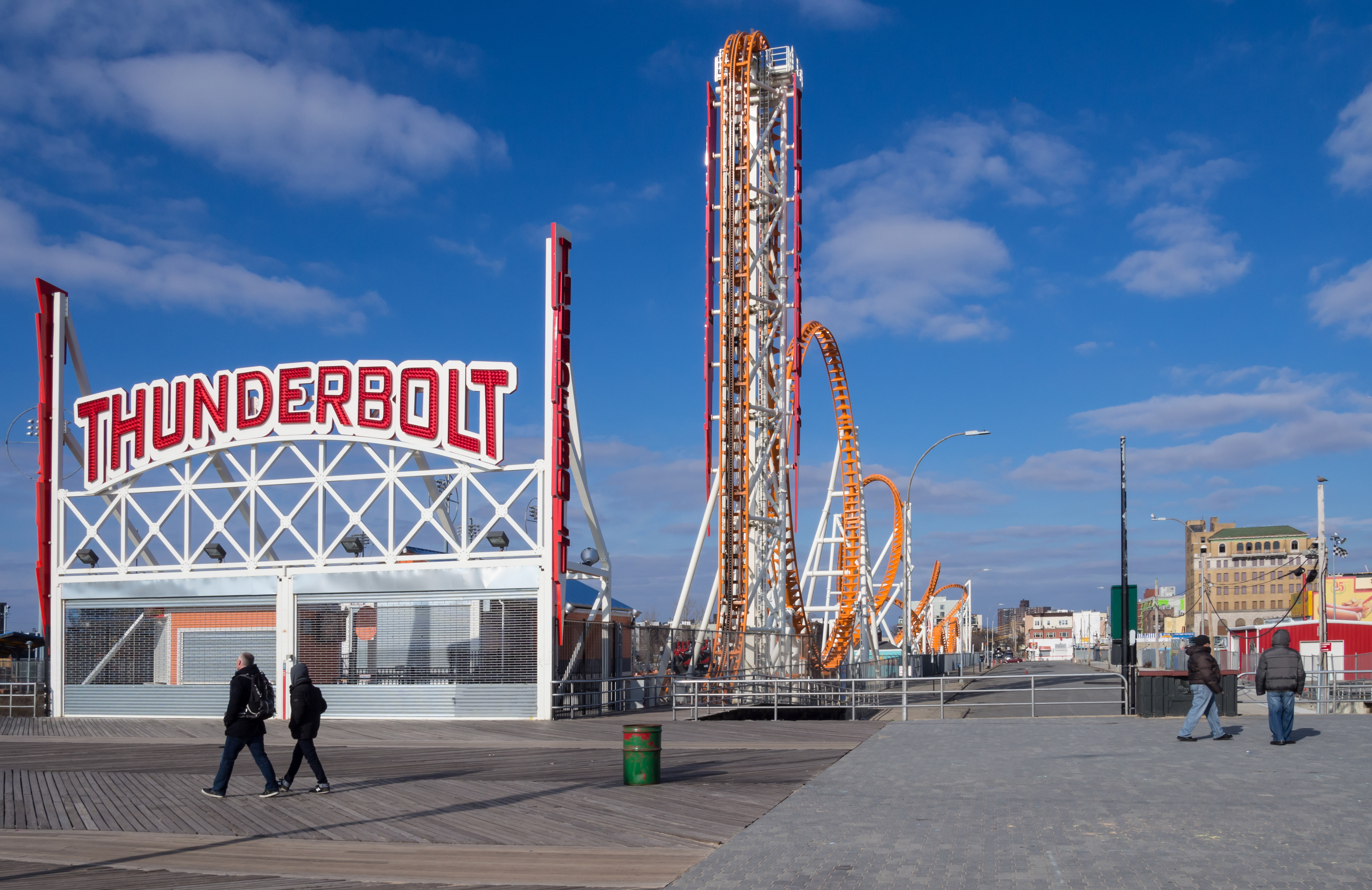
The Thunderbolt

- Atlantic Aviator
- Brooklyn Flyer
- Clockworkz
- Coney Clipper
- Cyclone
- Electro Spin
- Luna 360
- The Tickler (2010 roller coaster)
- Thunderbolt (2014 roller coaster)
- Tony's Express
- Leti's Treasure
- Sky Chaser

==== Family Rides ====
- B&B Carousell
- Circus Coaster
- Coney Island Hang Glider
- Coney Tower
- Lynn's Trapeze
- WindstarZ

==== Kiddie Rides ====
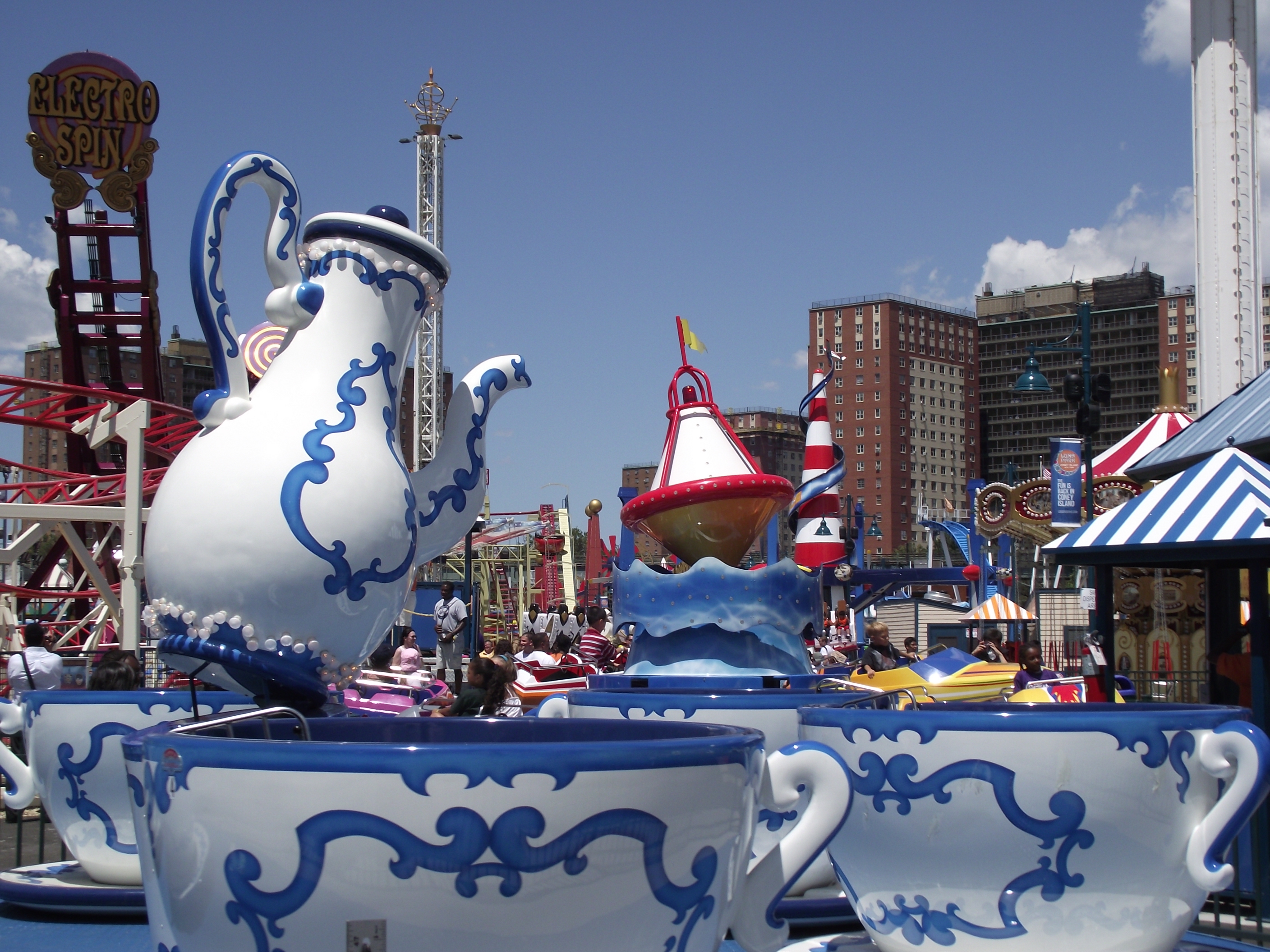
The Tea Party ride

- Brooklyn Barge
- Convoy
- Magic Bikes
- Seaside Swing
- Big Top Express
- Speed Boat
- Tea Party
- Circus Candy
- Fire Patrol

==== Victorian Gardens Rides ====
- Rainbowheel
- Aeromax
- Grand Prix
- Mini Mouse

=== Scream Zone ===
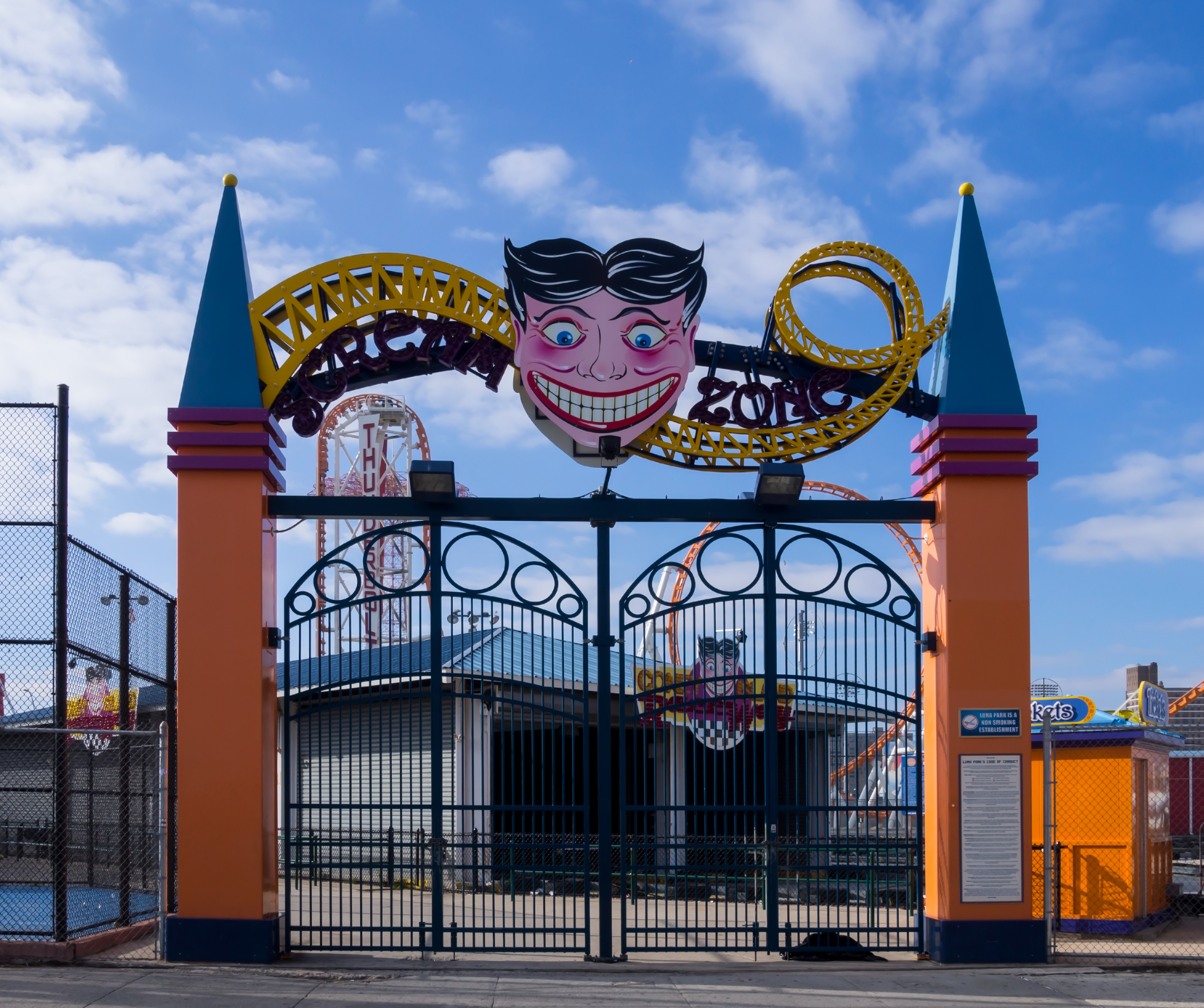
Entrance to the Scream Zone

For the 2011 season, an addition called Scream Zone opened that featured four rides. Since then, more rides have been added in a secondary section.

==== Rides ====
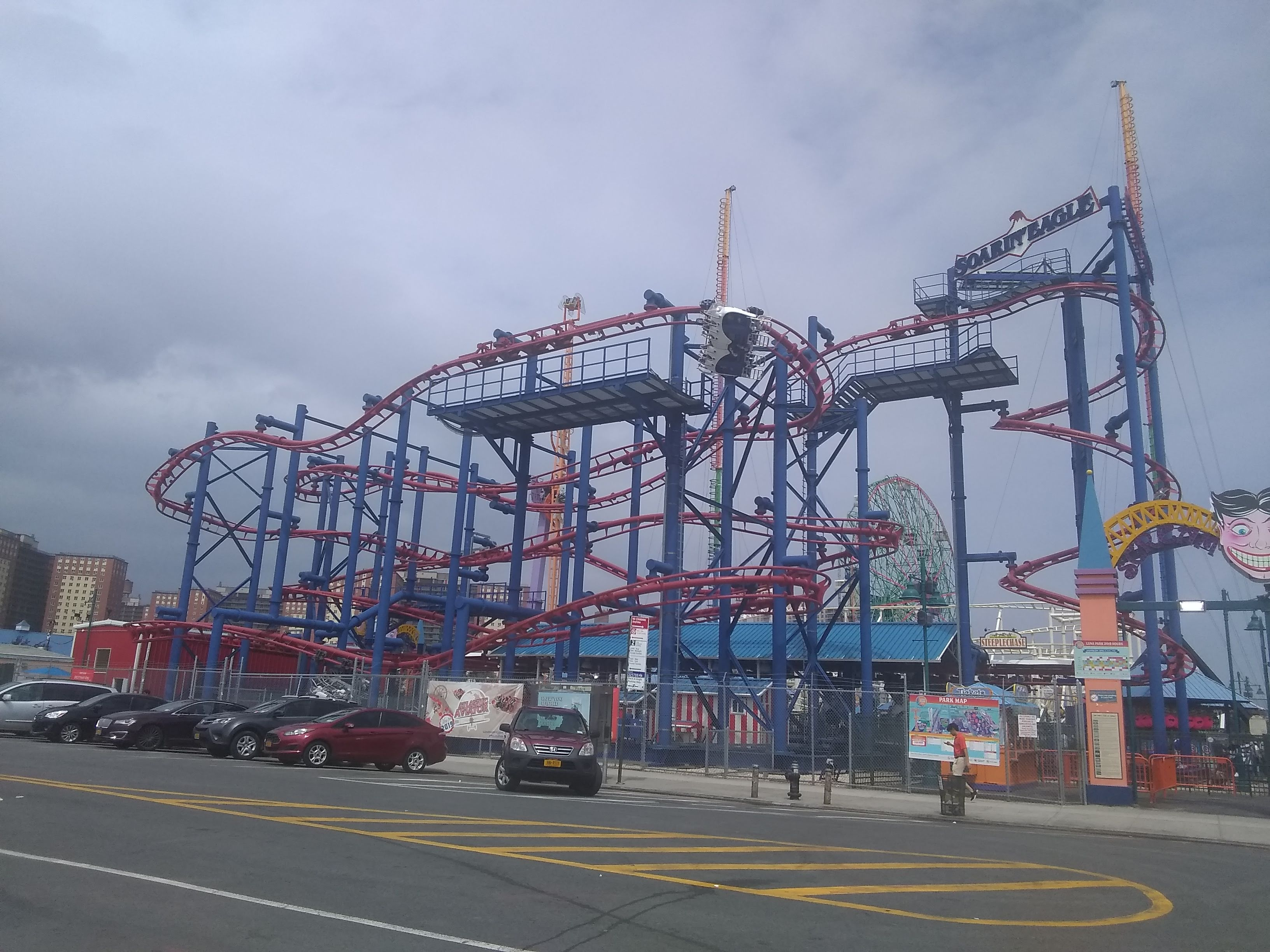
The Soarin' Eagle ride

- Astro Tower (Named after Astroland's Astro Tower)
- Endeavor
- Slingshot
- Steeplechase (2011 Roller Coaster) - A Zamperla launching motocoaster with trains resembling horses
- Soarin' Eagle - A Zamperla "flying" coaster where riders lie on their stomachs and cars go up a spiral lift hill
- Zenobio - A booster-type ride

=== Nearby Attractions ===
- Brooklyn Go-Kart - A kiddie version of the Coney Island Raceway, with different owners
- El Dorado's Auto Scooters - Bumper Cars
- Brooklyn Mini Golf
- Swinging Ship
- Coney Art Walls- A collection of public murals with an event venue and a Coney-Island theme, though some of the murals have been vandalized.
- Maimonides Park – a minor league ballpark that is home of the Brooklyn Cyclones
- Nathan's Famous, the original location of the chain

=== Arcades and Games ===
- Luna Park Arcade
- Warpzone Retro Darkade - A small arcade featuring retro arcade games.
- There are also many stall games spread through the area of the park.

=== Former Attractions ===
- Wild River - Log Flume
- Coney Island Raceway - Go-Kart Track
- Eclipse - Mini Discovery (2010-2013). Replaced by Luna 360. The ride now operates at Six Flags Great Escape as Extreme Supernova.

== See also ==
- Luna Park, list of parks based on the original Luna Park
