= Astroland =

Former amusement park in Coney Island, Brooklyn, New York

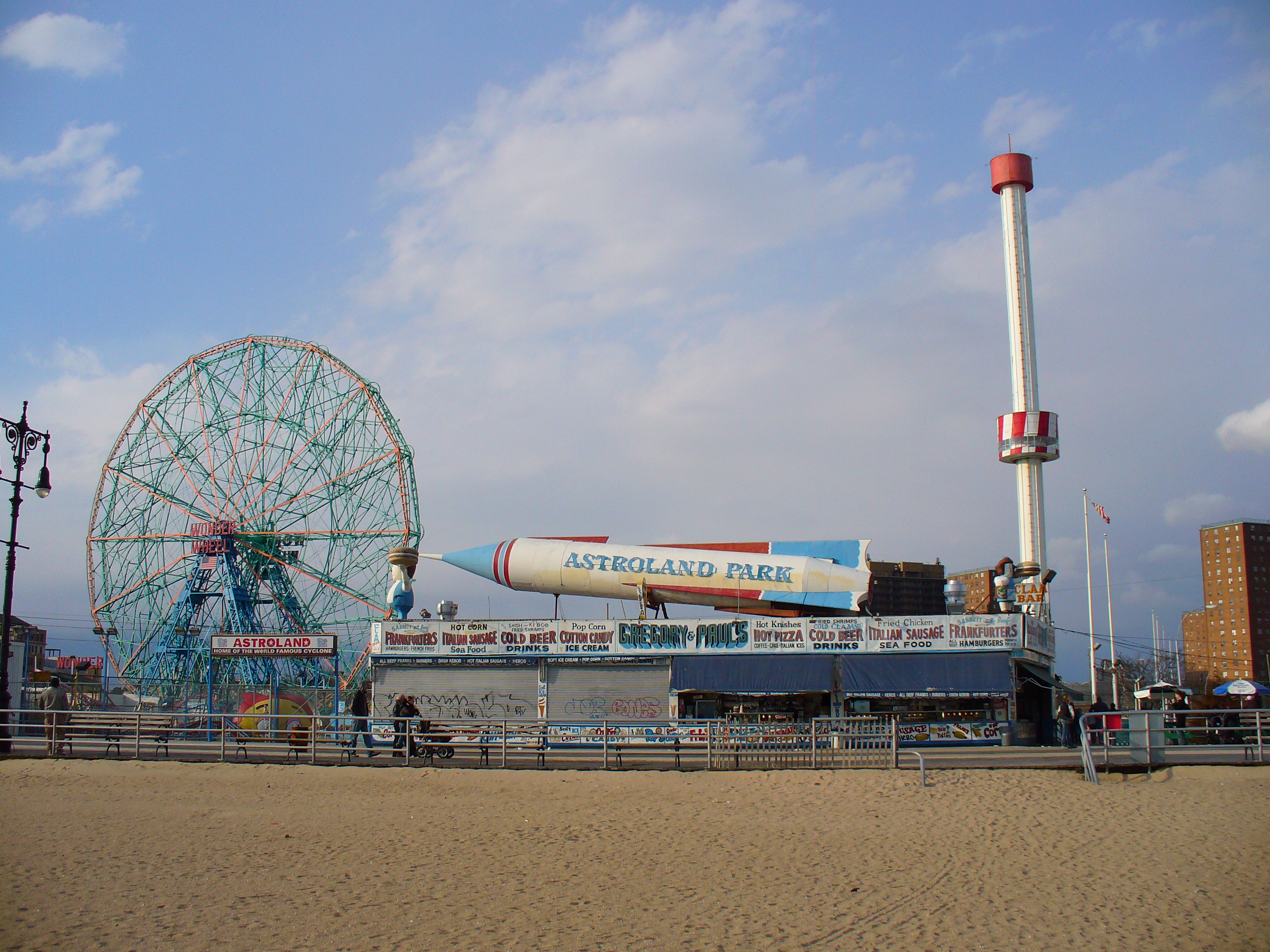
- Astroland entrance on the Riegelmann Boardwalk (2007)
- Interactive map of Astroland
- Location: Coney Island, Brooklyn, New York, U.S.
- Coordinates: 40.5743°N 73.9792°W
- Status: Defunct
- Opened: 1962
- Closed: September 7, 2008
- Operating season: March–November
- Area: 3.1 acres (1.3 ha)

Attractions
- Total: approximately 36
- Roller coasters: 2
- Water rides: 1

Astroland was a 3.1-acre (1.3 ha) amusement park in Coney Island, Brooklyn, New York City that opened in 1962. It was located at 1000 Surf Avenue (at the corner of West 10th Street) on the boardwalk. It ceased operations on September 7, 2008.

== History ==
Astroland was first built as a "space-age" theme park when it opened in 1962, although in later years "a visit [was] more like stepping into the past than the future." Some of the later rides were similar to regular carnival rides, but others offered a kitsch experience that was lacking in modern amusement parks.

In 1955, Dewey Albert and his friends Nathan Handwerker, Herman Rapps, Sidney Robbins and Paul Yampo formed a corporation called Coney Island Enterprises. In 1957, Rapps and Albert announced they would build Wonderland. Through a series of acquisitions, together they built what is today known as Astroland, with rides including the Tower to the Stars or Astrotower gyro tower, the Cape Canaveral Satellite Jet emulating a trip to the Moon, the Mercury Capsule Skyride carrying patrons in bubble cars across the park to the boardwalk, and the Neptune Diving Bells, a duplicate of an Atlantic City ride that took patrons 30 feet down into a tank to watch porpoises and fish. In June 1975 Astroland was chosen to be the new operator of the Cyclone, the famous wooden roller coaster, which stood on Parks Department land. On July 12, 1975, an early-morning fire wiped out much of the park, but they were able to rebuild.

=== Closure ===
On November 28, 2006, Astroland was sold by the Albert family for US$30 million to Thor Equities, which announced plans to redevelop the area as a $1.5 billion year-round resort, although the plans never came to fruition. Under the agreement, the Alberts would continue to operate the Cyclone. At the time, the Alberts hoped to relocate attractions like the water flume and the Astrotower to another part of the neighborhood. After the sale, opposition to the relocation plan emerged. Efforts supporting the extension of Astroland's existence for the 2008 summer season were established. Astroland celebrated the 45th anniversary of its opening on April 1, 2007.

It was announced on October 24, 2007, that the Albert family and Thor had reached a deal, and that Astroland would re-open March 16, 2008. However, after a few months when no agreement between the two parties could be reached, Astroland closed on September 7, 2008. It was replaced in 2009 by a new park called Dreamland. A new amusement park called Luna Park, named after Brooklyn's original, well-known Luna Park and other Luna Parks from the early twentieth century, opened for the 2010 season on May 29, 2010, at the former site of Astroland.

On July 2, 2013, Luna Park was evacuated as a precaution due to a problem with the Astrotower swaying. The Fire Department of New York responded to the park after concerns regarding the structural integrity of the former operational ride, which was situated in the center of the amusement area. Because of the potential risk to other rides in the area of the tower, those attractions were closed on the Fourth of July. An initial portion of the Astrotower was taken down beginning the night of July 3, 2013. Demolition crews worked through the night into the morning of July 4 to remove part of the Astrotower, and Luna Park reopened to visitors at 3 P.M. (EDT). By July 6, 2013, the Astrotower had been reduced to a four foot high stump, and the pieces were sold to a local junkyard for scrap.

The former Astroland Rocket was brought back to Coney Island near the site of the former park, installed as a historical monument inside neighboring Deno's Wonder Wheel Park. Signs posted in front of the rocket by the Coney Island History Project explain its history.

== Rides and attractions ==
=== Adult rides ===
- Musik Express (MONAE) (operated in 2008 only) (travel in USA)
- Power Surge (until mid-2006) (sold, went to Australia)
- Top Spin 2 (sold to Funtown Pier and later sold to travel unknown)
- Coney Island Cyclone (operations transferred to Luna Park in 2011)
- Water Flume (An Arrow Dynamics Log Flume)
- Pirate Ship (storage in Parque Diversiones)
- Bumper Cars (currently operates at the neighboring Deno's Wonder Wheel Amusement Park)
- Dante's Inferno
- Break Dance relocated from Lincoln Park in Massachusetts. Reopened in 1988 (storage in Parque Diversiones and sold to UK)
- Astrotower gyro tower (unused after 2010, demolished in 2013)
- Tilt-A-Whirl (relocated to Parque Diversiones)
- Scrambler (relocated to neighbor at Deno's Wonder Wheel in 2015 and later sold)
- Enter Prise (replace for Top Spin added)
- Super Himalaya (Mack) (replace for Power Surge added)
- Wave Swinger (replace for Pirate Ship added)
- Rainbow (replace for Break Dance added)
- Bayern Kurve (replace for Super Himalaya added)
- Round Up (old Astroland)
- Paratrooper (old Astroland)
- Satellite Jet (old Astroland)
- Diving Bells (old Astroland)
- Mercury Capsule Skyride (old Astroland)
- Astroland Rocket (old Astroland) (currently on display at neighboring Deno's Wonder Wheel Amusement Park)
- Apollo 11

=== Kiddie rides ===
- Pirate Jet
- Mini Tea Cups
- Frog Hopper
- Motorcycle Jump
- Super
- Himalaya
- Fire Engines
- Big Apple Coaster
- Mini Trucks
- Convoy
- Popeye Boats
- Circuit 2000
- Carousel
- Kiddie Roller Coaster (replace for Big Apple Coaster)
- Dune Buggy Jump

=== Other attractions ===
- More than ten games of skill
- Three arcades
- Two Coney Island-style restaurants

== In popular culture ==
Astroland was used as a location in the music video for "Even the Nights Are Better," a 1982 ballad by Air Supply.
