= Marcus Illions =

American carousel carver (1871–1949)

Marcus Charles Illions
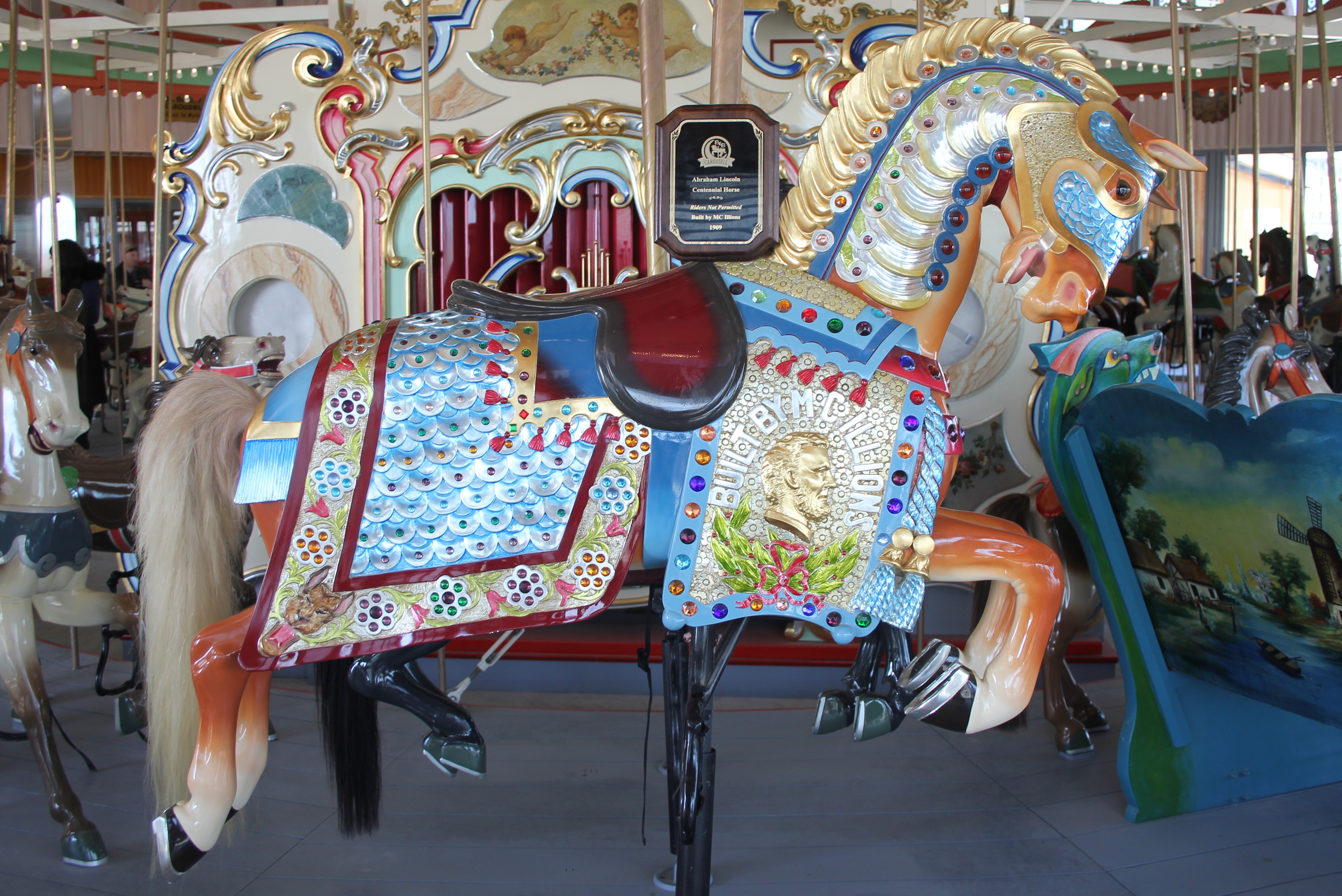
- A 1909 Illions creation on Coney Island's B&B Carousell
- Born: circa 1871; Lithuania
- Died: August 11, 1949; Brooklyn, New York
- Occupation: Carousel carver
- Children: Harry (born circa 1893), Phillip (1895), Rudolph (1897), Rose (1899), Bernard (1902).

Marcus Charles Illions (c. 1871–1949) was a master carver of wooden carousel horses and other figures at Coney Island, Brooklyn, New York City in the early 20th century. The New York Times referred to him as "the Michelangelo of carousel carvers".

Illions was born in 1870 or 1871 in Lithuania, becoming a builder of circus wagons before emigrating to England, where he carved carousel horses. An alternative account in an obituary states that he was actually born in England. He came to America in 1888, where he carved for Charles I. D. Looff and William F. Mangels in Coney Island before starting his own company, M. C. Illions and Sons Carousell Works, in 1909. His five children were all active in the business from very early ages, in roles that included carver and commercial artist. At one time in the early 1900s, ten carousels carved by Illions operated in Coney Island.

Illions was an exponent of what has become known as the Coney Island style of carousel figure carving, which "is characterized by flamboyant horses, bedecked with jewels and gold and silver leaf". By 1909, Illions' company produced "a new line of horses with explosive, flying manes and powerful, straining bodies, decked out with latticework harnesses and other virtuoso feats of carving".

A machine known as Feltman's Carousel is considered by one source to have been Illions' best work. Though no longer intact, 24 of its horses were incorporated into the Flushing Meadows Carousel in 1964 and are still in use today.

The Great Depression of the 1930s decreased demand for amusement products and Illions experienced financial problems. He died broke in 1949. His legacy includes extant carousels across the United States, which are listed here:

Carousel Name	City and State	Year
San Francisco Zoo	San Francisco, CA	1921
Six Flags New England	Agawam, MA	1909
Worlds of Fun	Kansas City, MO	1926
Flushing Meadows Carousel	Flushing, NY	1903
Congress Park	Saratoga Springs, NY	1904
Hempstead Lake State Park	West Hempstead, NY	1914
Columbus Zoo	Powell, OH	1914

During the restoration of the B&B Carousell for its 2013 reopening on the Coney Island Boardwalk, it was discovered that one of the horses is in fact by Marcus Illions. All of the other horses were executed in the early 1920s by another well-known Coney Island carver, Charles Carmel. The Illions horse was one of a set of four executed in 1909 to commemorate the centennial of the birth of Abraham Lincoln, and features colorful rhinestones and a relief of Lincoln's profile. This is the only one of the set that can be ridden by the public today, as the other three are all in private collections. The most recent prior owner of the B&B had used the Illions horse to replace one of the Carmel horses that an earlier owner had removed from the carousel.
