= Thunderbolt (2014 roller coaster) =

Steel roller coaster in New York City

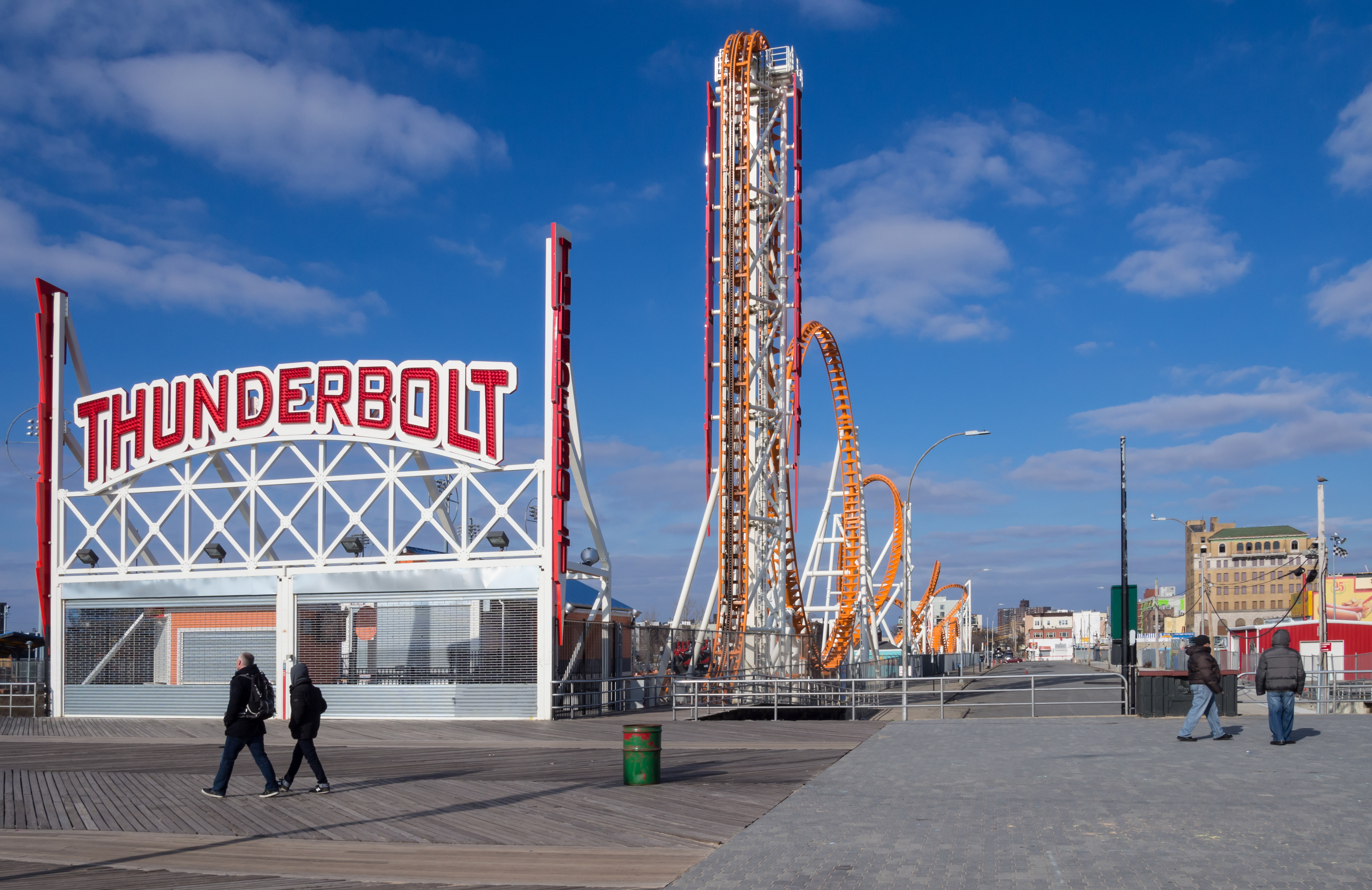
- The completed Thunderbolt

Luna Park
- Location: Luna Park
- Coordinates: 40.573487°N 73.982551°W
- Status: Operating
- Opening date: June 14, 2014
- Cost: US$9 million

General statistics
- Type: Steel
- Manufacturer: Zamperla
- Lift/launch system: Vertical chain lift
- Height: 115 ft (35 m)
- Drop: 112 ft (34 m)
- Length: 2,234 ft (681 m)
- Speed: 56 mph (90 km/h)
- Inversions: 4
- Duration: 00:38
- G-force: 4.3
- Height restriction: 50 in (127 cm)
- Trains: Unknown number of trains with a single car; riders arranged 3 across in 3 rows for a total of 9 riders per train
- Pay-per-use attraction
- Thunderbolt at RCDB

Thunderbolt is a steel roller coaster at Luna Park in the Coney Island neighborhood of Brooklyn in New York City. It is located near Surf Avenue and West 15th Street, on the Riegelmann Boardwalk next to the B&B Carousell.

== History ==
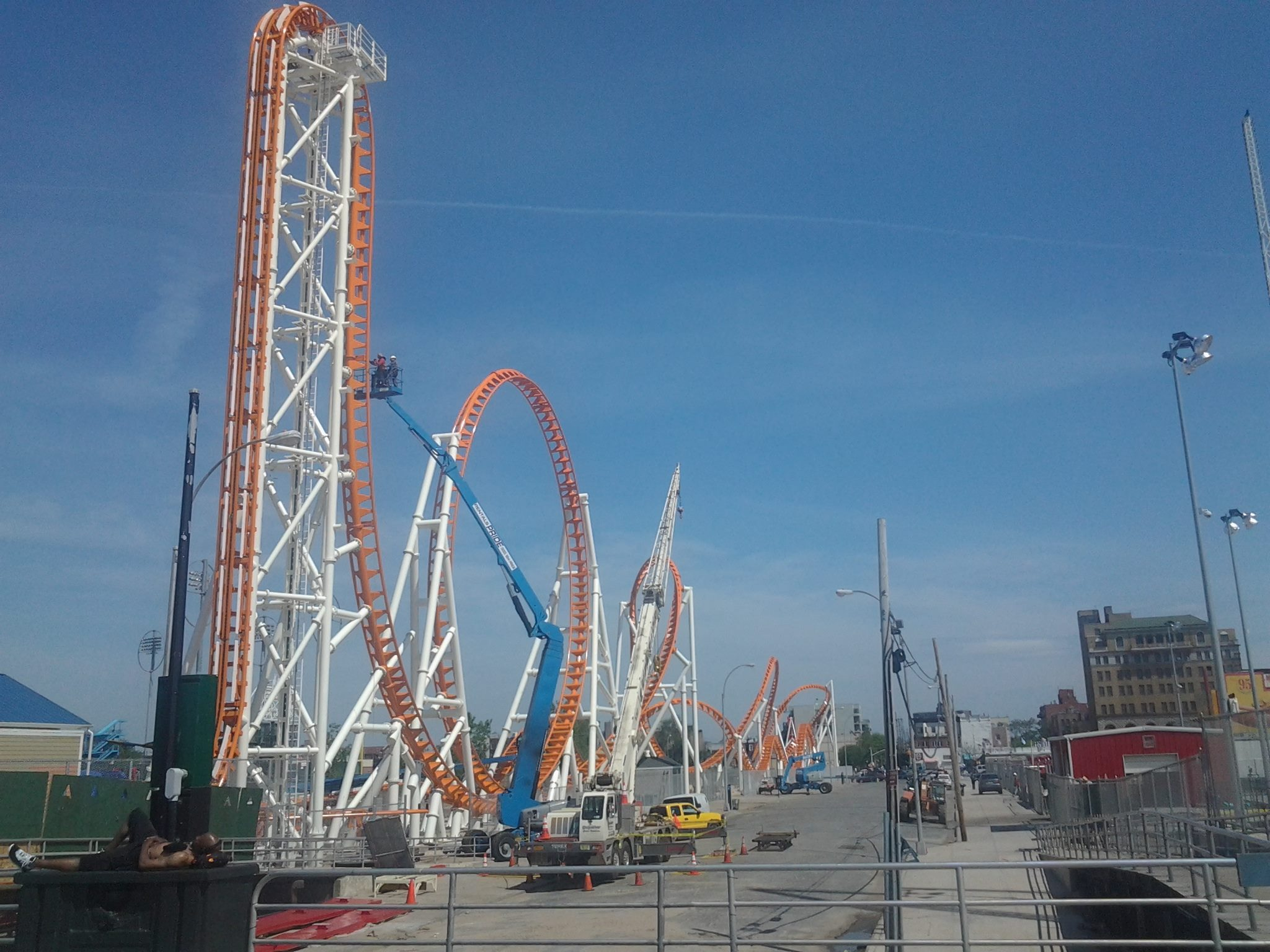
Under construction

A wooden roller coaster named the Thunderbolt was originally operated by George Moran on Coney Island from 1925 to 1982. It was demolished in 2000 due to neglect.

In June 2013, it was announced that the operators of Luna Park at Coney Island, Zamperla, would construct a new steel roller coaster which would use the Thunderbolt name. Due to the small footprint required for the coaster, the original plans called for the coaster to use an elevator instead of a lift hill. The ride's manufacturer Zamperla announced further details in November 2013, which showed that the ride would have a vertical lift hill.

Published reports stated that Thunderbolt was expected to be completed and opened by Memorial Day 2014, but construction delays pushed the opening date back. During Memorial Day weekend, on May 25, 2014, the opening was delayed to early June and revised to open by June 6. Just before the scheduled opening on June 6, the opening date was once again delayed. Thunderbolt finally opened on June 14, 2014.

== Characteristics ==
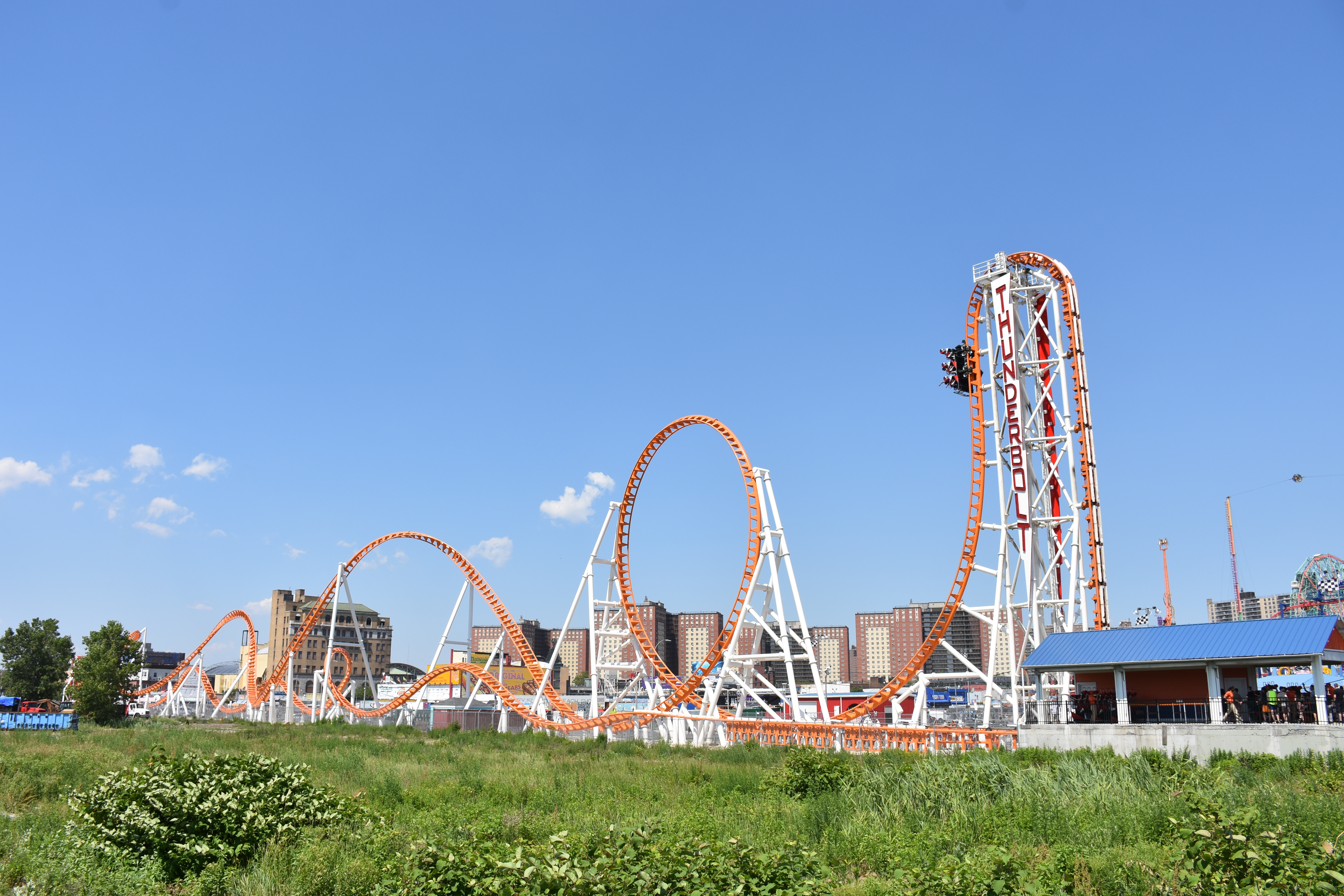
Thunderbolt viewed from the west, June 2016

Thunderbolt was manufactured by Zamperla at a cost of $9 million and has a 90-degree vertical drop and four inversions. From the beginning of the initial drop, to the end of ride, it takes 38 seconds. The ride features 2,234 feet (681 m) of track and runs at a top speed of 56 miles per hour (90 km/h). Thunderbolt is a pay-per-use attraction, as guests must pay $12 for each time they ride on the coaster.

After leaving the station, the train turns 180 degrees to the left and enters a 90-degree, 125-foot (38 m) lift hill. It immediately descends 90 degrees and enters a vertical loop, followed by a Zero-G Roll to the left. After the second inversion, the train enters a leftward-sloping Stengel dive, followed by a dive loop to the right. The train goes over two airtime hills before entering a right-hand corkscrew. After the corkscrew, the train enters an off-axis bunny hill before hitting the brake run and entering the station.

Each train consists of a single car with nine seats, arranged in three rows of three. This is different from conventional coaster trains, which are usually arranged in rows of two or four across.

== Other installations ==
Coney Island's Thunderbolt is the first of five Zamperla coasters manufactured under the "Thunderbolt" brand as of 2019. There are three possible layouts for the Thunderbolt coaster model. The first version is 2,234 feet (681 m) long. This layout is used by Coney Island's Thunderbolt and two other coasters: Rapid Train at Gyeongnam Mason Robotland in Gyeongnam, South Korea; and Rollin' Thunder at the Park at OWA in Foley, Alabama. The second version is 2,215 feet (675 m) long while the third version is 1,230 feet (375 m) long. Both alternate versions are meant to operate on wider lots with a shorter depth.
