= Thunderbolt (1925 roller coaster) =

Former roller coaster at Coney Island, Brooklyn, New York

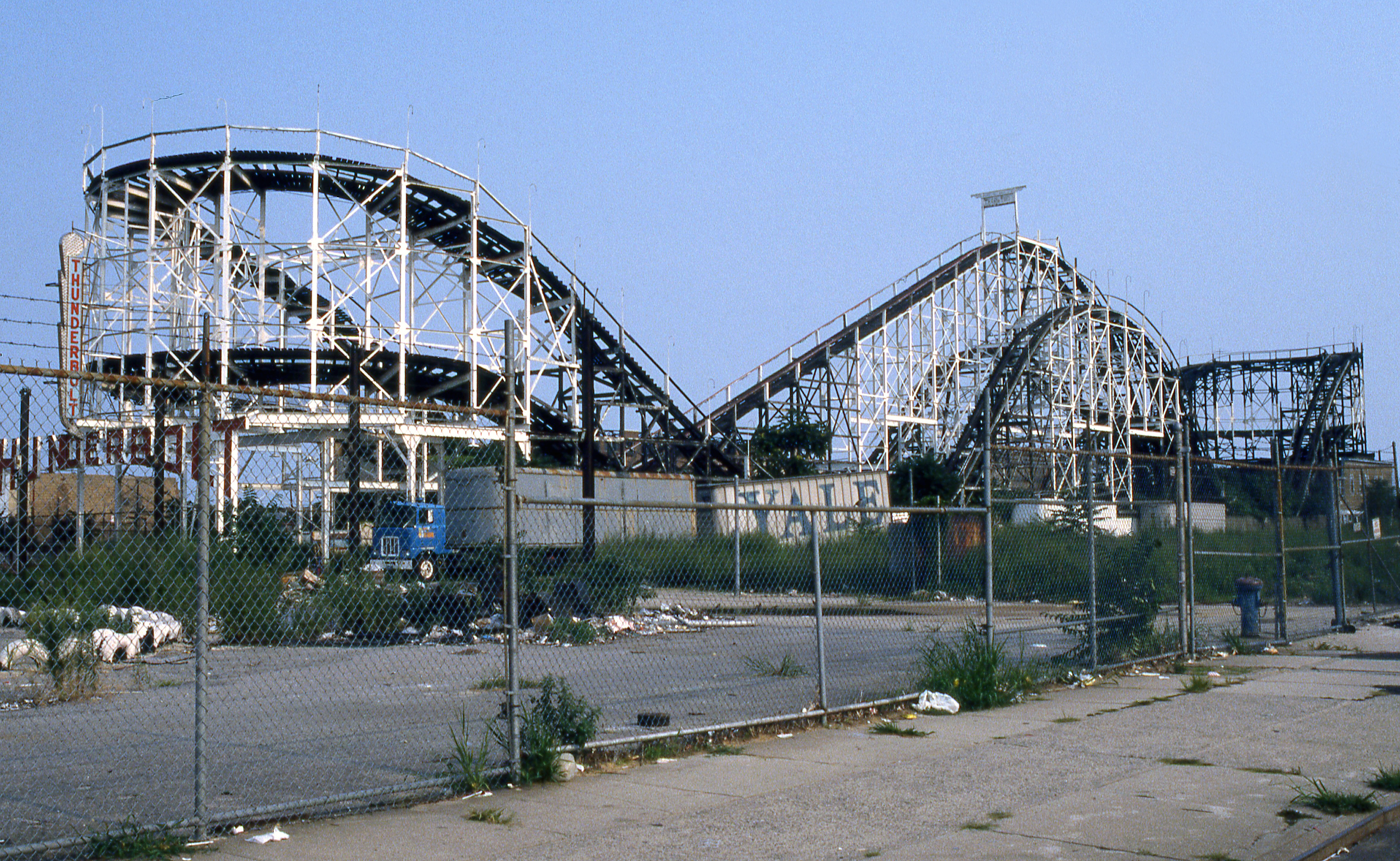
- The inactive Thunderbolt in 1986

Coney Island
- Location: Coney Island
- Coordinates: 40°34′26″N 73°58′57″W
- Status: Removed
- Opening date: 1925
- Closing date: 1982

General statistics
- Type: Wood
- Designer: John A. Miller
- Height: 86 ft (26 m)
- Duration: 1:17
- Thunderbolt at RCDB

The Thunderbolt was a wooden roller coaster located at Coney Island in Brooklyn, New York. Designed by John Miller, it operated from 1925 until 1982 and remained standing until it was demolished in 2000. The demolition was controversial, as the property owner Horace Bullard was not notified, nor had any formal inspection been done on the structure.

In June 2013, it was announced that a new steel roller coaster would be constructed on Coney Island named the Thunderbolt. The steel coaster opened in 2014 and uses a completely different design.

== In popular culture ==
It was featured briefly in Woody Allen's 1977 film Annie Hall as the boyhood home of Alvy Singer (Allen's character). The house was a real residence, built in 1895 as the Kensington Hotel. The roller coaster was constructed with part of its track scaling the top of the building.

The indie rock/slowcore band Red House Painters 1993 album, Red House Painters (Rollercoaster) features a sepia toned photograph of the Thunderbolt as its cover art. The last film to photograph the Thunderbolt was Requiem for a Dream.

In the 1995 IMAX film Across the Sea of Time, the coaster is featured in abandoned condition.

In the 1998 movie He Got Game, Spike Lee features the coaster in its dilapidated state.

In the 2025 video game Old Skies, an area in front of the abandoned rollercoaster is a time travelling landing point from the future back to 1993.
