= William F. Mangels =

American amusement manufacturer (1866–1958)

William F. Mangels (1 February 1866–11 February 1958) was an amusement manufacturer and inventor. He worked at Coney Island and was a major player in the development of American amusement parks at the start of the 20th century. In addition to manufacturing carousels and inventing rides, including The Whip, he wrote a book titled The Outdoor Amusement Industry: From Earliest Times to the Present (ISBN 0848820029). Mangels is interred at Green-Wood Cemetery in Brooklyn, New York.

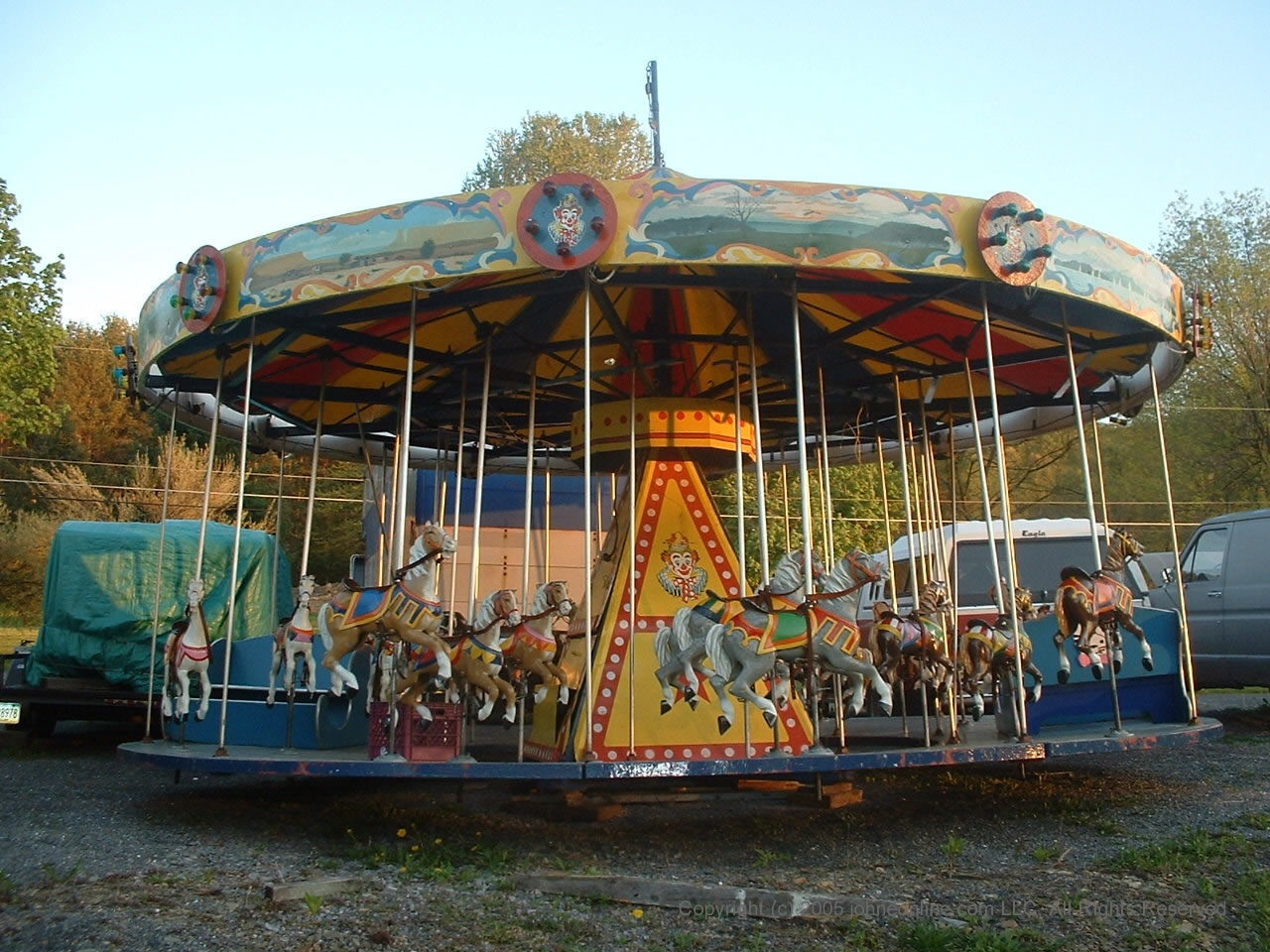
W.F. Mangels Kiddie Galloping Horse Carrousel circa 1935

== Early life and career ==
Mangels was born on February 1, 1866, in Germany. In 1883, he moved to New York and began working as a bicycle repairman. He was called to work on a carousel and found an interest in the mechanics. He later started the W.F. Mangels Company, which would become one of the biggest amusement park ride manufacturers.

Mangels would enter a business relationship with M. C. Illions, the wood carver for many of his carousels. His 1901 patent that focuses on the cranks used to make carousel horses go up and down is still used today.

== Death ==
Mangels died on February 11, 1958, at the age of 92 at his home in Brooklyn.
