= A Trip to the Moon (disambiguation) =

A Trip to the Moon is a 1902 French silent film by Georges Méliès.

A Trip to the Moon or Le voyage dans la lune may also refer to:

- Trip to the Moon (1958 film), a Mexican comedy film
- "A Trip to the Moon" (Chronicle), a 1964 TV science fiction comedy film episode
- Le voyage dans la lune (album), by Air, 2012
- Le voyage dans la lune (opera-féerie), by Jacques Offenbach, 1875
- A Trip to the Moon (attraction), a dark ride at Coney Island
- Drop the Dip, later known as Trip to the Moon, a former roller coaster at Coney Island

== See also ==
- A Voyage to the Moon (disambiguation)
- Exploration of the Moon, various missions to the Moon
- Moonshot (disambiguation)
