= Electrocuting an Elephant =

1903 film

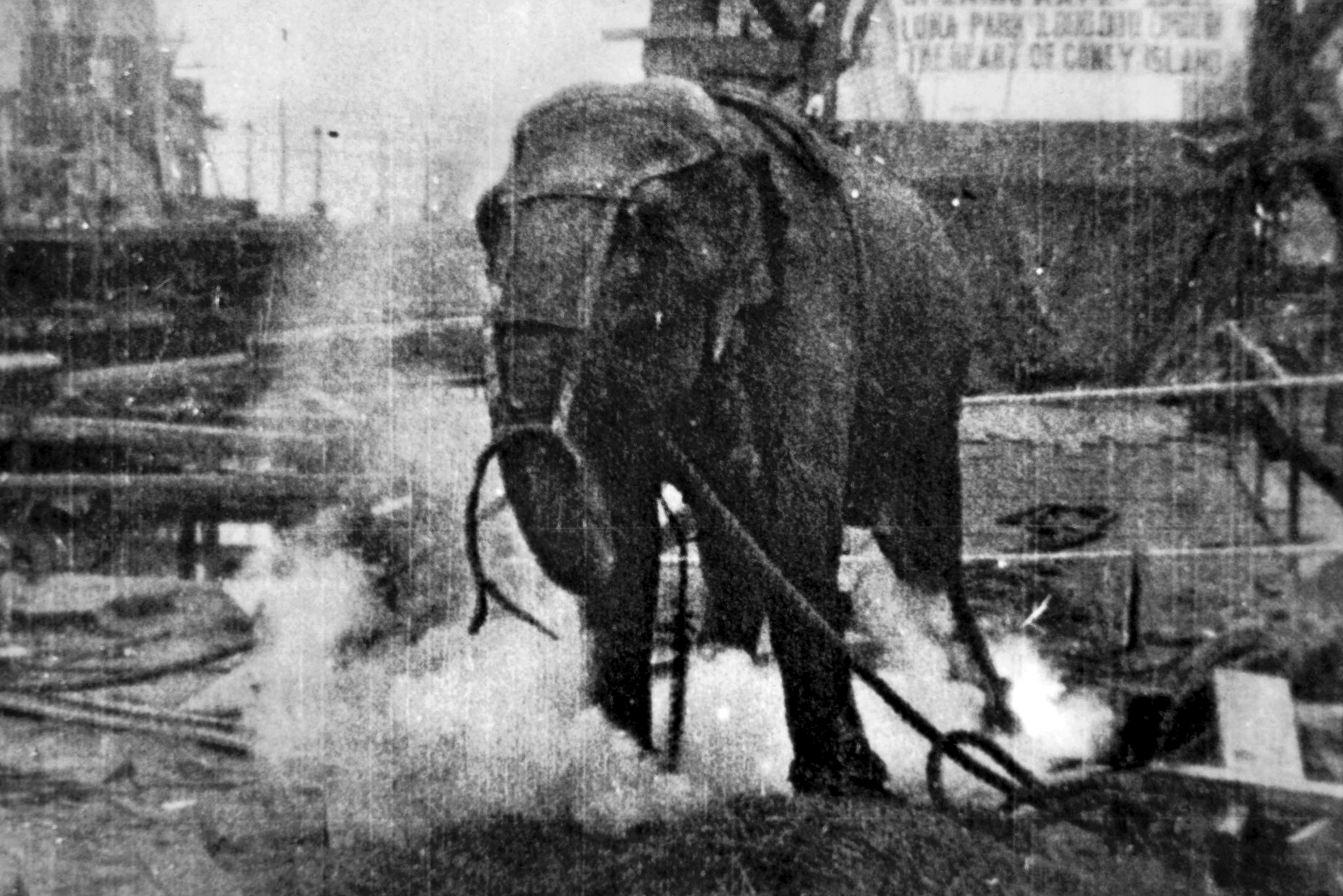
- A frame capturing the moment electricity is shot through Topsy's body. The smoke around her is the result of heat generated by the electrical current.
- Cinematography: Edwin S. Porter or Jacob Blair Smith
- Distributed by: Edison Manufacturing Company
- Release date: January 17, 1903
- Running time: 74 seconds (70 feet of film)
- Country: United States
- Language: Silent

Electrocuting an Elephant (also known as Electrocution of an Elephant) is a 1903 American black-and-white silent actuality short film depicting the killing of the elephant Topsy by electrocution at a Coney Island amusement park on January 4, 1903. It was produced by the Edison film company (part of the Edison Manufacturing Company) and is believed to have been shot by either Edwin S. Porter or Jacob Blair Smith.

The film was released on January 17, 1903, 13 days after Topsy's death. It was later submitted to the Library of Congress as a paper print for copyright purposes. This form of submission may have saved the film for posterity since most films and negatives of this period decayed or were destroyed over time. It is believed to be the first time a death was ever captured in a motion picture film. As a film published in 1903, it is in the public domain.

== Background ==
This film documents the publicly announced killing of Topsy the elephant at the unfinished Luna Park on Coney Island, New York City on January 4, 1903. The elephant had recently been acquired from Forepaugh Circus, where she had a reputation as a "bad" elephant, having killed a drunken spectator the previous year who burnt the tip of her trunk with a lit cigar. After several incidents at Luna Park (sometimes attributed to the actions of her handler, William "Whitey" Alt) the owners of Luna Park, Frederic Thompson and Elmer "Skip" Dundy, claimed they could no longer handle the elephant and announced they would hang Topsy in a public spectacle and charge admission. The American Society for the Prevention of Cruelty to Animals stepped in, questioning the idea of hanging an elephant as well as making a public spectacle out of the death of an animal. The event was instead limited to invited guests and press only. Thompson and Dundy agreed to use a more sure method of strangling the elephant with large ropes tied to a steam-powered winch, with both poison and electrocution planned as backup, a measure supported by the ASPCA.

== Synopsis ==
The full Electrocuting an Elephant film

The 74-second film opens with Topsy being led past a crowd of people through an unfinished Luna Park to the execution spot, an island in the middle of a lagoon used for boat-rides, by elephant handler Carl Goliath.

The film cuts and an intervening hour and forty-five minutes are not recorded. During this unrecorded interval, Topsy refused to cross the bridge to the island forcing the park employees and Brooklyn Edison electricians to re-rig the strangling apparatus and electrical wiring to where Topsy stood. Topsy was fed carrots laced with 460 grams of potassium cyanide by press agent Charles Murray, while copper-clad sandals connected to electric lines were strapped to her feet. When the film camera restarts, Topsy is seen with the bridge over the lagoon and the original execution spot. Topsy tries to shake off one of the sandals and then stands still.

Sharkey gave a signal and an electrician on a telephone told the superintendent at Coney Island station nine blocks away to close a switch, before Luna Park chief electrician Hugh Thomas closes another within the park, sending 6,600 volts from Bay Ridge across Topsy's body for 10 seconds, toppling her to the ground as smoke rises from her feet. According to at least one contemporary account, she died "without a trumpet or a groan." Right at the end of the film, the noose tied around Topsy's neck can be seen tightening.

== Release ==
This was one of many short actuality films by the Edison Manufacturing Company shot at Coney Island from 1897 on. It was released on January 17, 1903, 13 days after Topsy's death, to be viewed in Edison coin-operated kinetoscopes. It was described in the Edison catalog as:

Topsy, the famous "Baby" elephant, was electrocuted at Coney Island on January 4, 1903. We secured an excellent picture of the execution. The scene opens with keeper leading Topsy to the place of execution. After copper plates or electrodes were fastened to her feet, 6,600 volts of electricity were turned on. The elephant is seen to become rigid, throwing her trunk in the air, and then is completely enveloped in smoke from the burning electrodes. The current is cut off and she falls forward to the ground dead.

Electrocuting an Elephant does not seem to have been as popular as other Edison films from that period.

=== Copyright status ===
Under the Copyright Act of 1909, the copyright of a film released around that time would last 28 years unless it was renewed for another 28 years by its owner. Therefore, Electrocuting an Elephant entered the public domain in the United States in either 1931 or 1959.

== Depiction in media ==
The film fell into relative obscurity in the years after 1903, showing up as an out-of-context clip in the 1979 film Mr. Mike's Mondo Video. In 1991, documentary maker Ric Burns made the film Coney Island which included a segment recounting the death of Topsy, including clips from the film Electrocuting an Elephant. The film was also used in a memorial arts piece to commemorate the 100th anniversary of Topsy's death created by New Orleans artist Lee Deigaard and exhibited at the Coney Island USA museum. It allowed the public to view the film on a hand cranked mutoscope while surrounded by hanging chains and standing on a copper plate.

=== War of the currents misconception ===
In popular culture, Thompson and Dundy's execution of Topsy has switched attribution, with narratives claiming the film depicts an anti-alternating current demonstration organized by Thomas A. Edison during the war of the currents waged against his competitor, George Westinghouse. This is a popular misconception. Edison never visited Luna Park and the electrocution of Topsy took place 10 years after the war of the currents had already ended. Edison was, in fact, no longer attached to General Electric, which had formed from a merger between Edison General Electric Company and the Thomson-Houston Electric Company in 1892. By 1903, there was no longer motivation for Edison's production company to produce anti-alternating current propaganda. The use of alternating current for executions had already become standard practice.

== See also ==
- Mary, another "bad elephant" whose 1916 execution by hanging was a similar public spectacle
- Edwin S. Porter filmography
