= Coney Island (1991 film) =

- Directed by: Ric Burns
- Written by: Richard Snow; Ken Burns; Geoffrey C. Ward
- Produced by: Buddy Squires; Ric Burns; Justin Rhodes
- Starring: David McCullough; Sam Waterston; Julie Harris
- Cinematography: Buddy Squires; Allen Moore; Alicia Weber
- Edited by: Paul Barnes; Tricia Reidy
- Music by: Alicia Weber
- Production company: Steeplechase Films
- Distributed by: Direct Cinema
- Release date: February 4, 1991
- Running time: 90 minutes
- Language: English

Coney Island is a 1991 documentary film that traces the history of Coney Island, the westernmost part of the barrier islands of Long Island, New York. The film covers the island's 1609 discovery by Henry Hudson, its 1870s incarnation as a respectable beach destination for city-dwellers and a showcase of the new developments ushered in by the machine age, the early 20th century, when amusement parks and innovative attractions attracted hundreds of thousands of people each day, and the gradual demise of the amusements.

The film is narrated by Philip Bosco. It premiered at the Sundance Film Festival and was broadcast nationally on PBS as part of the American Experience program in February 1991.

On-camera appearances include Al Lewis, Vincent Gardenia, Eli Wallach, Elliot Willensky, Frederick Fried and Mae Timpano. Voice-over actors include Judd Hirsch, Nathan Lane, John Mahoney, Jerry Orbach, George Plimpton, Lois Smith, Frances Sternhagen and Andrei Codrescu.

== Synopsis ==
Coney Island began as a resort destination in the early 1830s and gained popularity in the 1860s as advances in transportation reduced the time it took to get there from other parts of New York City. As visitors increased, attractions were added, including a tall observation tower, the Coney Island Elephant Hotel, early roller coasters, carousels, and arc lights to enable nighttime swimming.

Politician John Y. McKane controlled approval of much of the building for years until he was removed from office for election fraud. Just before 1900 CE, George C. Tilyou built Steeplechase Park, the first of the three major amusement parks of Coney Island. At this point, Coney Island was attracting around 250,000 people on a summer Sunday. Luna Park followed in 1903, debuting its popular "A Trip to the Moon" ride. The park was decorated with thousands of electric lights, which were still a novelty at the time. In January 1903, before Luna Park opened, the owners decided to euthanize one of their elephants named Topsy by publicly electrocuting it. Conducted at the Shoot the Chute lagoon plastered with advertising banners announcing the new park's opening, the spectacle drew 1500 people, 100 press photographers, and an Edison Manufacturing film crew (scenes from the Edison film Electrocuting an Elephant can be seen in this segment). In 1904, Dreamland was opened by William H. Reynolds. It featured historical reenactments, a dwarf village with 300 residents, and an infant incubator for premature babies, designed to show off this latest scientific development. Just seven years later, a devastating fire destroyed Dreamland and initiated the slow decline of Coney Island. The death of George C. Tilyou in the aftermath of World War I saw a reduced level of innovation in the new attractions at Coney Island, though the crowds only got bigger. During the Great Depression, many of the existing attractions, amusements and midway prizes were reduced in scale to save money. As World War II ended, the new ubiquity of the personal automobile allowed families to easily vacation at less crowded beaches in the Greater New York area. In 1946, Luna Park closed. Steeplechase Park limped along until closing in 1964.

== Critical reception ==
Time magazine called the film one of the top ten television programs of 1991, and the Chicago Tribune called it "one of the best documentaries you will ever see".

== Awards ==
- Organization of American Historians Erik Barnouw Award in 1992
- Chicago Film Festival's Silver Hugo Award
