= John Peter Haines =

American non-profit executive

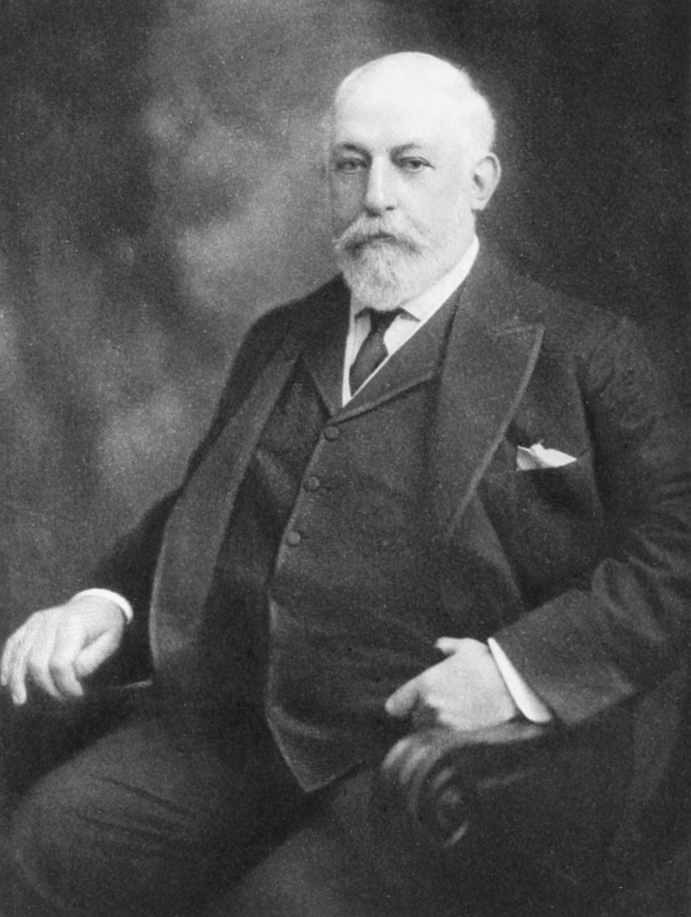
- Born: December 17, 1851; New York, New York
- Died: June 27, 1921 (aged 69); Toms River, New Jersey
- Education: Columbia University
- Occupation(s): Businessman, activist
- Spouse: Mary Merritt (m. 1873)

Signature
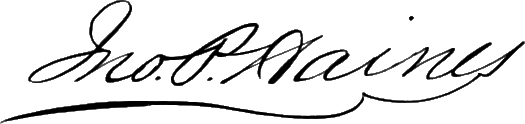

John Peter Haines (1851–1921) was President of the American Society for the Prevention of Cruelty to Animals (ASPCA) from 1889 to 1906.

== Biography ==
John Peter Haines was born in Manhattan, New York on December 17, 1851, the son of William Augustus Haines and Emily Somers (Stagg) Haines. He had three siblings by the names of William Augustus Haines Jr. (1846–1912), Richard Townley Haines (1855–1896), and Emily Somers Haines Jr. (1858–1928). He was educated by private tutors and at Columbia University.

He married Mary Merritt in 1873.

He died at his home in Toms River, New Jersey on June 27, 1921.

== Animal welfare ==
Haines was on the executive committee of the American Society for the Prevention of Cruelty to Animals (ASPCA) for 14 years. He was the president of the ASPCA from 1889 to 1906. As president he expanded the organization and improved the headquarters of the Society by designing newly built file rooms and an ambulance house.

In 1903 he stopped the owners of the Coney Island Luna Park from conducting a public hanging of an elephant named Topsy saying it was needlessly cruel and animal deaths should not be a public spectacle. Instead, he agreed to a more private affair that included poisoned carrots with cyanide, electrocution, then afterwards strangulation with a winch.
