= A Voyage to the Moon =

A Voyage to the Moon may refer to:

- Comical History of the States and Empires of the Moon, a 1657 novel by Cyrano de Bergerac, some translations of which bear this title
- A Voyage to the Moon (Tucker novel), an 1827 novel by George Tucker under the pseudonym Joseph Atterley

== See also ==
- A Trip to the Moon (disambiguation)
