= A Trip to the Moon (attraction) =

Dark ride at Coney Island

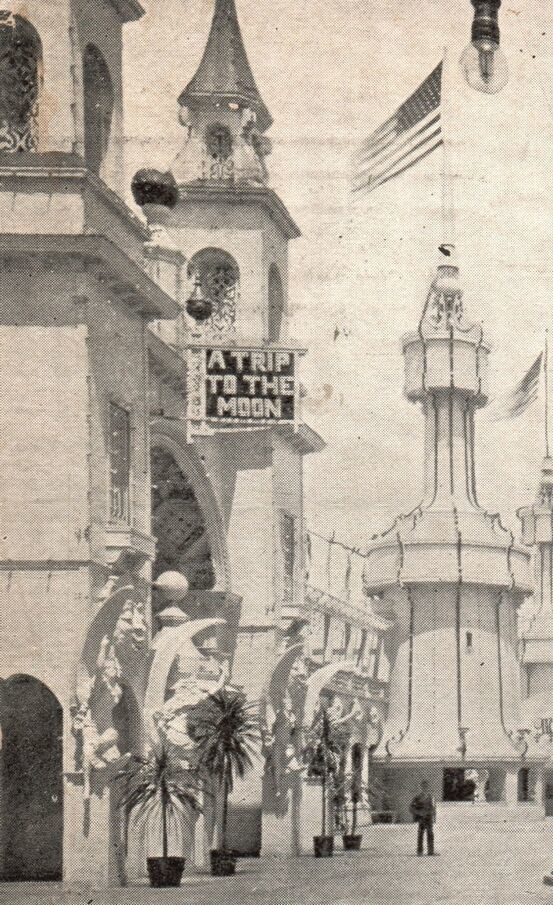
Entrance to A Trip to the Moon

A Trip to the Moon was a pioneering early dark ride, best known as the flagship and namesake of Luna Park in Coney Island, Brooklyn, New York City.

== History ==
A Trip to the Moon was originally designed by Frederic Thompson for the Pan-American Exposition of 1901 in Buffalo, New York. Tickets for the popular ride were US$0.50 ($19.00 in 2025 dollars) at the time, twice the price of other attractions at the exposition. It was experienced by over 400,000 people before it closed on November 2, 1901. It was the first electrically powered mechanical "dark ride" and one of the first space rides.

After the exposition, Thompson and his partner Elmer "Skip" Dundy brought the attraction to Tilyou's Steeplechase Park, then later established it as the anchor of their newly opened Luna Park in 1903, on land formerly occupied by the Elephantine Colossus.

== Experience ==
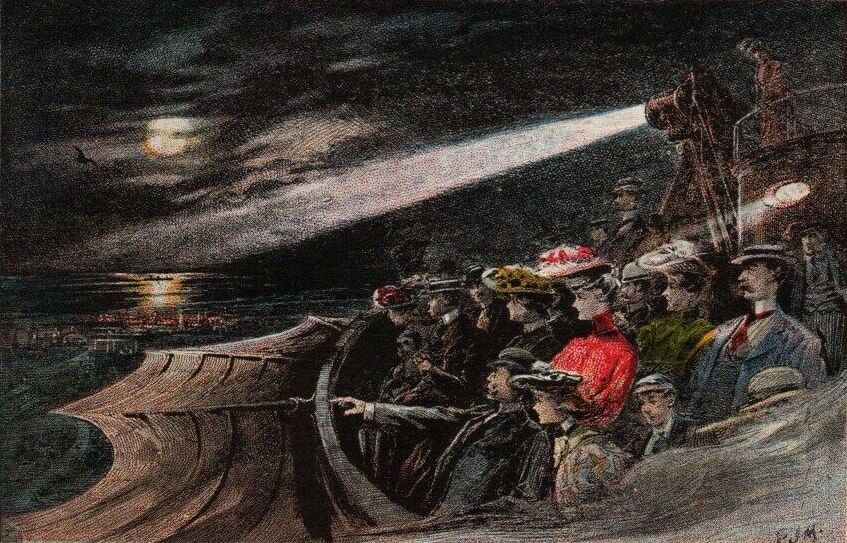
Contemporary illustration of the experience on A Trip to the Moon

The first version of the ride involved a simulated trip for thirty passengers from the fairgrounds to the Moon aboard the airship-ornithopter Luna, with visions displayed of Niagara Falls, the North American continent and the Earth's disc. The passengers then left the craft to walk around a cavernous papier-mâché lunar surface peopled by costumed characters playing Selenites. There they visited the palace of the Man in the Moon and his dancing "Moon maidens", before finally leaving the attraction through a Mooncalf's mouth. After it was brought to Coney Island's Luna Park, the ride was revamped in a new building at a cost of $52,000. The ride's centerpiece was a ship called Luna III, enlarged to accommodate more passengers. Unlike its original Buffalo incarnation, the new version of the ride passed over a panorama of Coney Island and Manhattan's skyscrapers before rising into the clouds.

== See also ==
- Topsy (elephant) - used in a publicity stunt, dragging the airship Luna from Steeplechase Park to Luna Park
