= Drop the Dip =

Former roller coaster at Coney Island

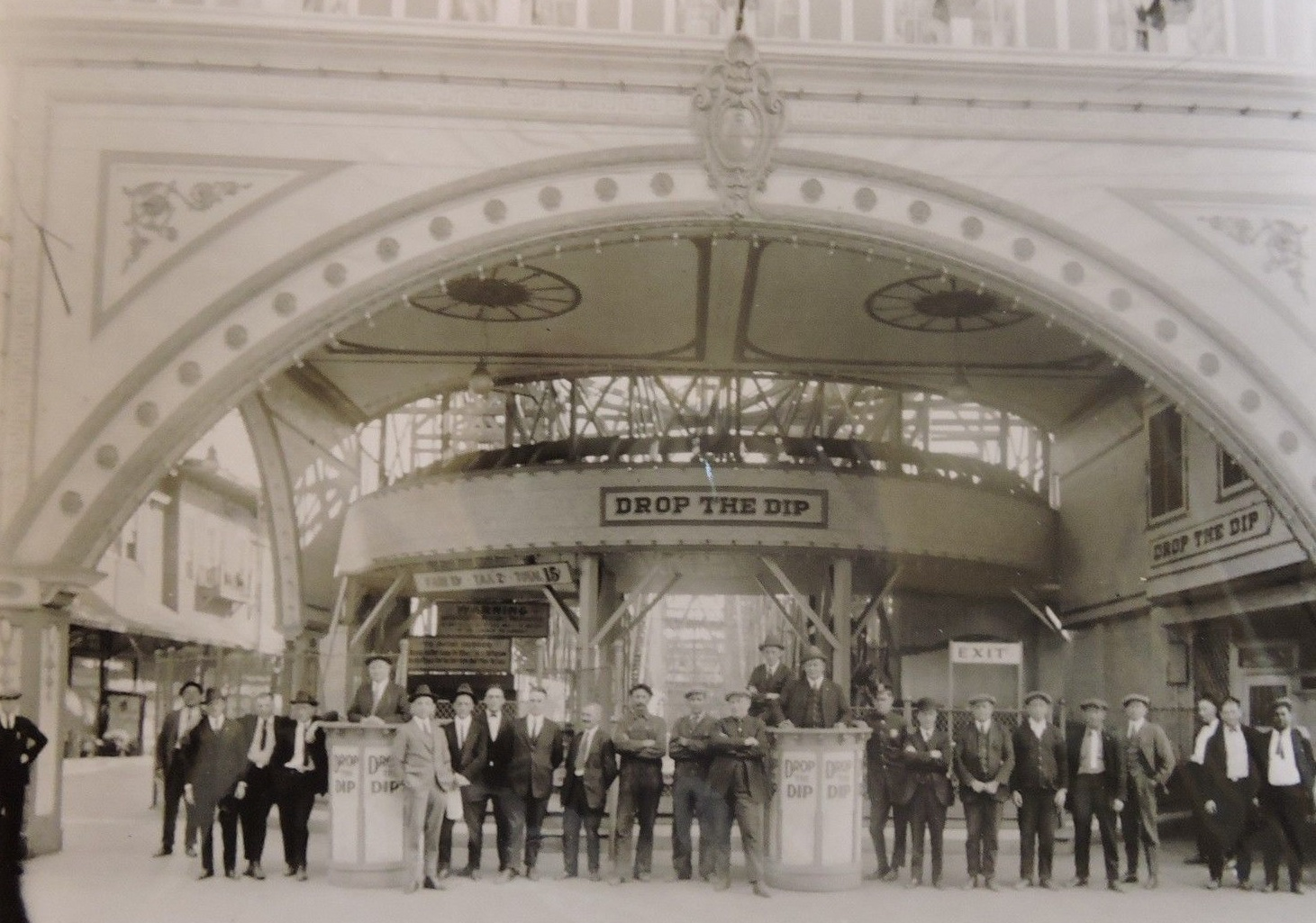
- Entrance to Drop the Dip on Coney Island Bowery

Coney Island
- Location: Coney Island
- Coordinates: 40.5744°N 73.9786°W
- Status: Removed
- Opening date: June 6, 1907
- Closing date: In the 1930s

General statistics
- Manufacturer: Arthur Jarvis
- Designer: Christopher Feucht, Welcome Mosley
- Height: 60 ft (18 m)
- Duration: 1 minute 30 seconds
- Trains: a single car. Riders are arranged 2 across in 2 rows for a total of 4 riders per train.
- Drop the Dip at RCDB

Drop the Dip, later known as Trip to the Moon, was a wooden roller coaster designed by Christopher Feucht and Welcome Mosley that opened in 1907. It operated at several locations in Coney Island, Brooklyn, and New York in the early 20th century. The coaster is often considered to have been the first high-speed roller coaster.

== Design ==
While innovative in its design, Drop the Dip was also noteworthy for how the design came to fruition. It was documented that a carpenter by the name of Christopher Feucht noticed a toy model of a roller coaster in the office of his dentist, Welcome Mosley. Intrigued by the exaggerated hills and turns on Mosley's model coaster, Feucht asked Mosley to partner with him in designing and building a full scale version that would be similar to his model.

Extreme elements in Drop the Dip represented an important shift away from the sedate approach of coaster design at the time. It was also the first coaster to feature lap bar restraints.

== History ==
The coaster opened on June 6, 1907, in the Bowery area of Coney Island to significant success. It operated for only a little more than a month, however, before it was destroyed by the 1907 Steeplechase Park fire. Soon after it was destroyed, Feucht rebuilt the coaster in even more extreme form. The coaster was also moved several times after the fire. It was moved across the street during the 1910s (in 24 hours) to acquire better rent values and then was moved once more to Luna Park in 1924 (then changing its name to Trip to the Moon) Throughout the years and moves, Feucht continued to make adjustments and improvements to the coaster. He also worked sometimes as a ride operator. The ride was popular at Coney Island and earned around $20,000 a year on a ticket price of 25 cents.

== Layout ==
In addition to its extreme drops and high speeds, Drop the Dip had a relatively compact footprint and short ride. Standing in a space of 450 by 65 feet (137 by 20 m), the ride was 90 seconds in length.
