= Elmer "Skip" Dundy =

American showman and promoter (1862–1907)

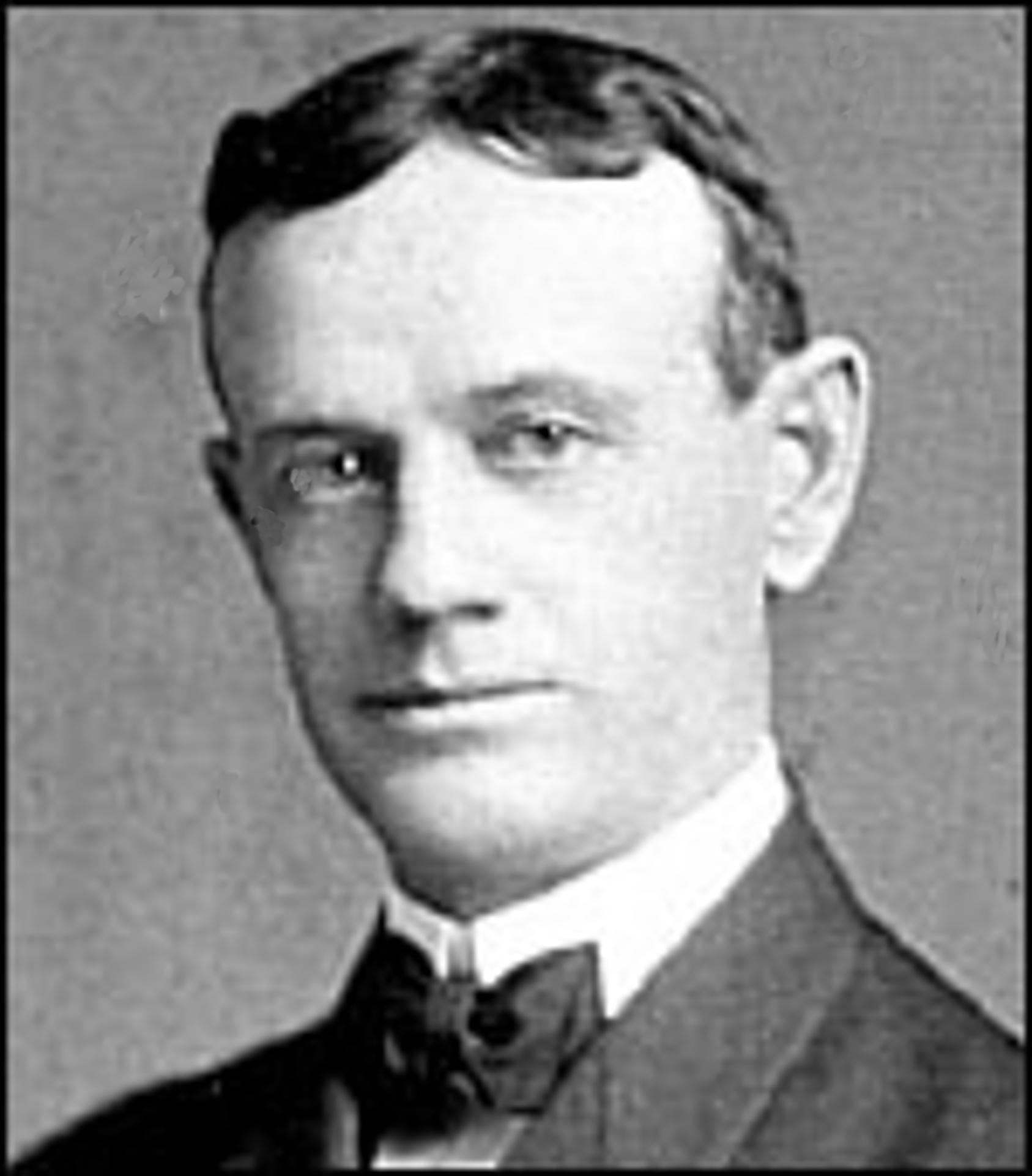
- c. 1900
- Born: Elmer Scipio Dundy Jr. March 31, 1862; Falls City, Nebraska, US
- Died: February 5, 1907 (aged 44); Manhattan, New York, US
- Resting place: Moravian Cemetery in Staten Island, New York
- Known for: showman, creator of amusement rides and parks

Elmer Scipio "Skip" Dundy Jr. (March 31, 1862 – February 5, 1907) was an American showman and promoter known for creating amusement rides and one of the first large amusement parks.

== Biography ==
Elmer Scipio Dundy Jr. ("Skip") was born in Falls City, Nebraska on March 31, 1862, the first of four children (and only son) of lawyer (and later United States District Court Judge) Elmer Scipio Dundy and Mary Dundy. Young Skip Dundy's had an early exposure to show business, due to in part the stories told by wild west showman Buffalo Bill Cody who was a familiar visitor in the Dundy home. He supposedly attended the University of Nebraska (although there is no record for his attendance) and in 1882 was appointed to the position of district court clerk by his father. When his father handled the bankruptcy of the Union Pacific Railroad Skip Dundy was appointed master in charge of that $20 million case, showing his aptitude for financial matters.

At the 1898 Trans-Mississippi Exposition in Omaha Dundy created and ran two attractions called "The Mystic Garden" and "Havana and the Maine". Their static walk-through setup made them not as popular as an elaborate moving diorama ride called "Darkness and Dawn" put together by a rival showman, Frederic Thompson, and Dundy lost money on the fair. At the planning sessions for the 1901 Pan-American Exposition in Buffalo, New York Dundy proposed his own pirated version of "Darkness and Dawn" and used his business skills to outmaneuver Thompson in getting the midway concession. Thompson then struck a deal with Dundy where they became business partners, sharing the profits from running several concessions on the midway including "Darkness and Dawn", the "Giant See-Saw", the "Old Plantation", and a new ride Thompson created, "A Trip to the Moon". This new popular ride drew over 400,000 people at US$0.50 head ($19.00 in 2024 dollars), twice the price of other attractions, and between Thompson's showmanship and Dundy's skill in finances they made a considerable amount of money.

Since there was a 3-year gap until the next worlds fair in St. Louis, Thompson and Dundy were convinced by George C. Tilyou to move "A Trip to the Moon" and the "Giant See-Saw" to his seaside Steeplechase Park on Coney Island in Brooklyn, New York. Unhappy with the cut Tilyou was giving them, they went on to purchase the nearby Sea Lion Park, vastly expanded it, and opened it in 1903 renamed Luna Park.

In 1905 Thompson and Dundy expanded their entertainment empire by building a huge indoor stadium in Manhattan called the Hippodrome. But things changed for the partnership in 1906 when Thompson married stage and silent-screen actress Mabel Taliaferro and put all his efforts into building her career, leaving the work of running their various entertainment venues to Dundy. On February 5, 1907 at the age of 44 Dundy died suddenly of heart failure after contracting pneumonia. Thompson continued on running operations but would go bankrupt in 1912 and fall into ill health after that, dying in 1919.
