= Luna Park (Coney Island, 1903) =

Amusement park in New York City (1903–44)

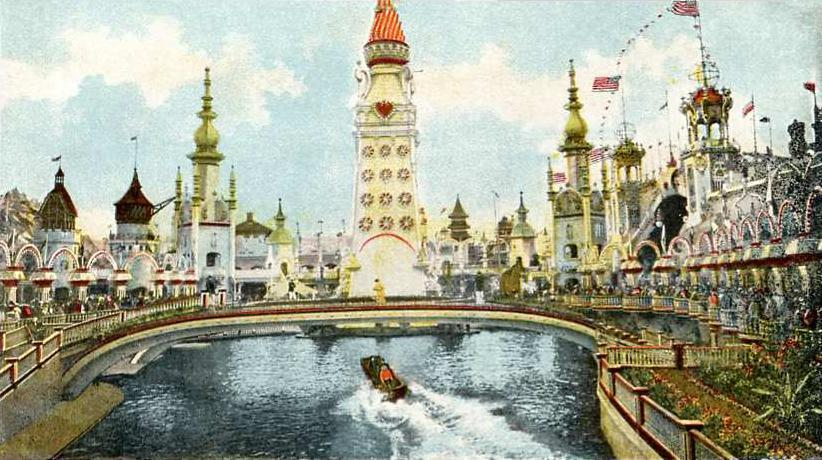
- Main Lagoon at Foot of Chutes, Luna Park
- Interactive map of Luna Park
- Location: Coney Island, Brooklyn, New York, United States
- Coordinates: 40°34′40″N 73°58′43″W
- Status: Defunct
- Opened: May 16, 1903
- Closed: August 13, 1944
- Owner: Frederic Thompson, Elmer "Skip" Dundy

Luna Park was an amusement park that operated in the Coney Island neighborhood of Brooklyn in New York City, United States, from 1903 to 1944. The park was located on a site bounded by Surf Avenue to the south, West 8th Street to the east, Neptune Avenue to the north, and West 12th Street to the west. Luna Park was located partly on the grounds of the small park it replaced, Sea Lion Park, which operated between 1895 and 1902. It was the second of the three original, very large, iconic parks built on Coney Island; the others were Steeplechase Park (1897, by George C. Tilyou) and Dreamland (1904, by William H. Reynolds). At Coney Island's peak in the middle of the 20th century's first decade, the three amusement parks competed with each other and with many independent amusements.

Luna Park's co-founders Frederic Thompson and Elmer "Skip" Dundy had created the "A Trip To The Moon" ride, which had been highly popular during the 1901 Pan-American Exposition, and operated at Steeplechase Park in 1902. Luna Park opened on May 16, 1903, and was highly profitable until Dundy died in 1907. Thompson operated the park alone until 1912, when his lease was canceled. The Luna Amusement Company owned the park from 1911 to 1939; during the Great Depression, creditors foreclosed on Luna Park twice. The park was leased to a syndicate in 1940 and continued to operate during World War II. Over the years, the park's owners constantly added new attractions and shows.

The park's western half was destroyed by a fire in August 1944 and never reopened, while the eastern half closed in September 1944. Although some rides on Surf Avenue continued to operate after 1944, much of the site remained closed for several years; the area was redeveloped as the Luna Park Houses between 1958 and 1962. Though another amusement park opened nearby in 2010 and was named Luna Park to commemorate the original, it is unrelated to the 1903 park.

== Development ==
Between about 1880 and World War II, Coney Island was the largest amusement area in the United States, attracting several million visitors annually. Sea Lion Park opened in 1895 and was Coney Island's first amusement area to charge entry fees; this, in turn, spurred the construction of George C. Tilyou's Steeplechase Park in 1897, the neighborhood's first major amusement park.

=== Background ===
In 1901, Frederic Thompson and Elmer "Skip" Dundy created a wildly successful ride called "A Trip To The Moon" as part of the Pan-American Exposition at Buffalo, New York. The name of the fanciful "airship" (complete with flapping wings) that was the main part of the ride was Luna, the Latin word for the moon. The airship, and the park that was subsequently built around it, may have been named after Dundy's sister in Des Moines, Luna Dundy Newman. George C. Tilyou invited Thompson and Dundy to move their attraction to Steeplechase for the 1902 season. The ride performed poorly during that season, which was extremely rainy. Thompson and Dundy opted to establish their own amusement park at the end of the season following a disagreement with Tilyou.

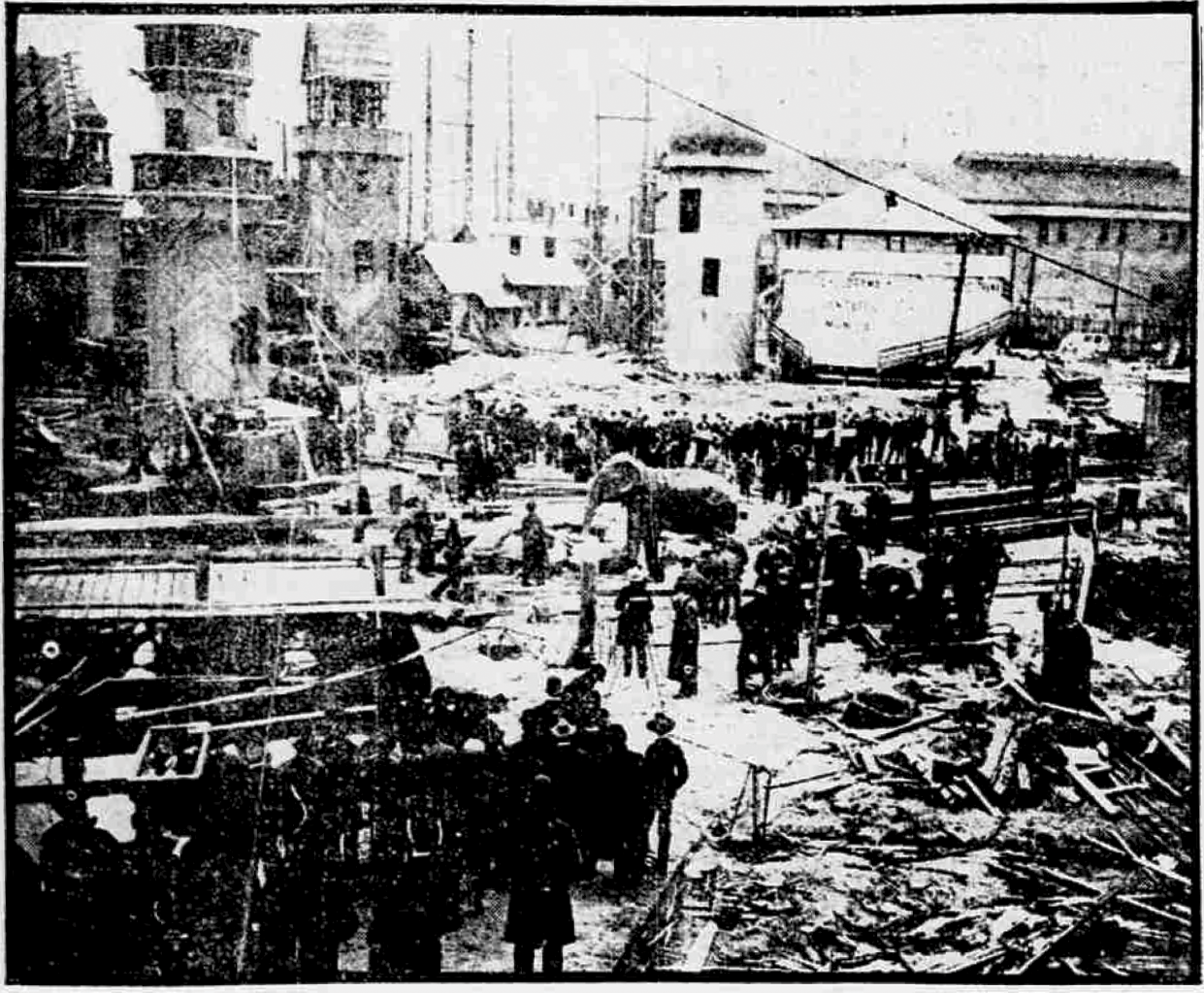
Luna Park under construction in January 1903. This picture was taken on the day Thompson and Dundy executed Topsy the elephant (standing in the middle of this image).

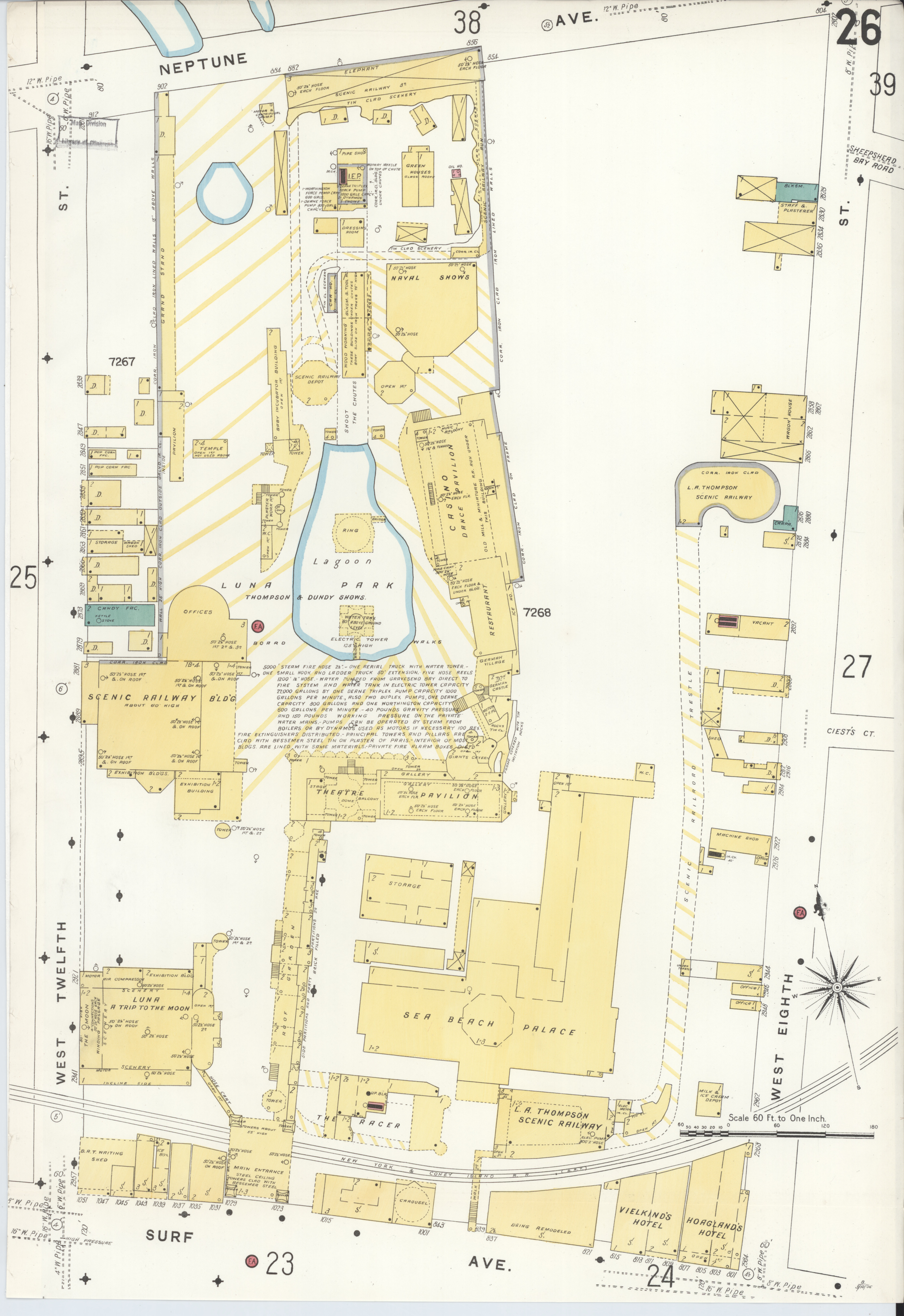
Map of Luna Park in 1906

Thompson and Dundy agreed to take over the site of Paul Boyton's 16-acre (6.5 ha) Sea Lion Park in August 1902. As part of the deal, they leased some land from Frederick Kister, and they also leased a strip of land on West 12th Street for 25 years. Sea Lion Park had several centerpiece rides, but low attendance during the 1902 season and competition with Steeplechase Park had prompted Boyton to leave the amusement park business. Thompson and Dundy also leased the adjacent site of the Elephantine Colossus Hotel, which had burned down in 1896. This gave them 22 acres (8.9 ha), all the land north of Surf Avenue and south of Neptune Avenue, between West 8th and West 12th Streets.

=== Construction and opening ===
Dundy was in charge of raising capital for the project, while Thompson was responsible for the park's layout and architecture. The Brooklyn Daily Eagle initially estimated that Thompson and Dundy would spend $200,000 renovating Sea Lion Park. Ultimately, the men spent $700,000 (although they advertised it as $1 million) totally rebuilding the park and expanding its attractions. Wall Street financiers and Coney Island speculators each contributed half the project's cost. By November 1902, Thompson aimed to open the park by May 2 of the following year. Topsy the elephant, which Boyton had bought that season to add to the menagerie of animals at Sea Lion Park, was involved in demolishing some of the old rides. During an October event that involved Topsy hauling the airship Luna from Steeplechase to its new location, handler William Alt was arrested for disorderly conduct after assaulting the elephant with a pitchfork and then turning it loose to wander down Surf Avenue. In an organized publicity stunt, Thompson and Dundy announced they would hang Topsy and sell tickets to the event. Following an intervention from the Society for the Prevention of Cruelty to Animals, Thompson and Dundy agreed to a more humane method of poisoning, electrocuting, and strangling the elephant in a smaller private affair that was captured in the short film Electrocuting an Elephant. Thompson and Dundy ultimately electrocuted Topsy, then killed her using cyanide, in January 1903.

Thompson and Dundy planned to add new rides including a flower garden, a German village, and a Trip to the Moon attraction. The lagoon and the Shoot the Chute attraction were the only parts of Sea Lion Park to be retained. Early plans called for Luna Park to include a tower with 38,000 lights. The park's original rides and attractions also included an infant incubator, a Shoot the Chute ride, a three-ring circus, and a Fire and Flames show that employed over a thousand performers. Luna Park unofficially opened on April 5, 1903, with a live show. The same month, Leo Wyent and George M. Foley sued to prevent Thompson and Dundy from issuing a concession allowing a third party to sell cigars and alcoholic beverages at the park. Thompson and Dundy planned to sell alcoholic beverages at one location in the park, the German Village.

Calling itself "the heart of Coney Island", Luna Park turned on its lights on May 16, 1903, at 8 p.m. The park's gates opened five minutes later to a crowd of 45,000 guests. It featured 39 shows and initially contained 53 buildings. Admission to the park was ten cents. An additional fee was required for some rides, ranging up to 25 cents for the most elaborate attractions, although the park also hosted free shows. Luna Park was accessible from Culver Depot, the terminals of the West End and Sea Beach railroad lines. Its general manager D. S. Smith had arranged for the Brooklyn Rapid Transit Company (BRT) to operate express trains directly to Park Row Terminal in Manhattan during the park's operating hours, terminating directly at Luna Park's main entrance; this arrangement continued until 1909. The park was extremely popular, recording 142,000 guests on Independence Day in 1903. Thompson and Dundy had recovered 90 percent of Luna Park's construction cost less than three months after its grand opening.

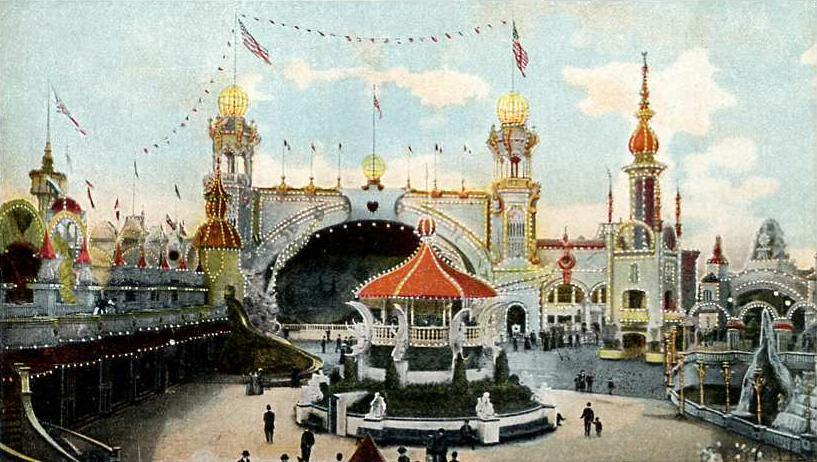
The Dragon's Gorge

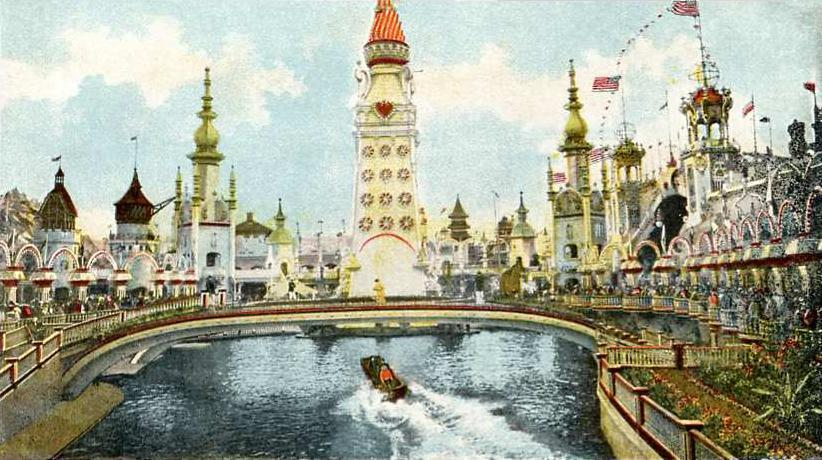
Main Lagoon

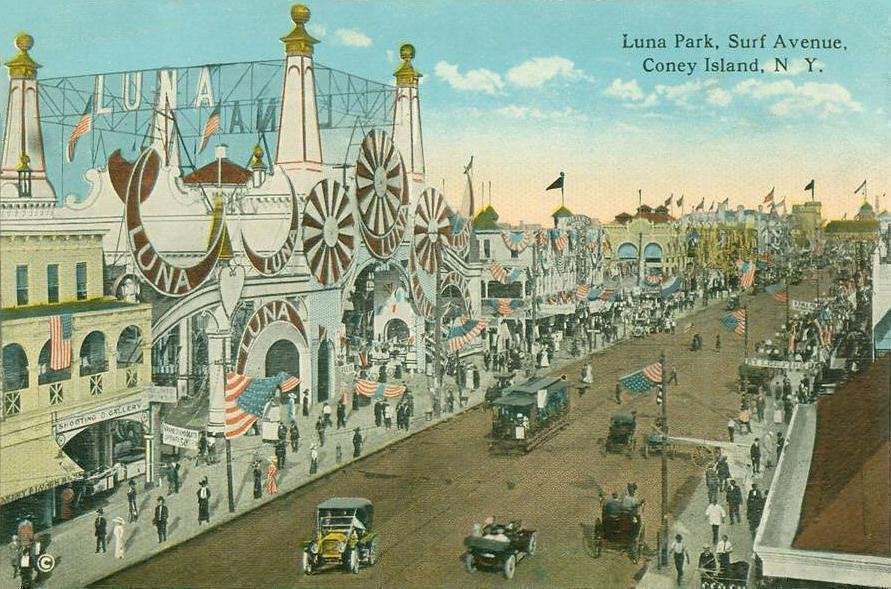
Entrance, seen in 1913

== Operation ==
=== 1900s ===
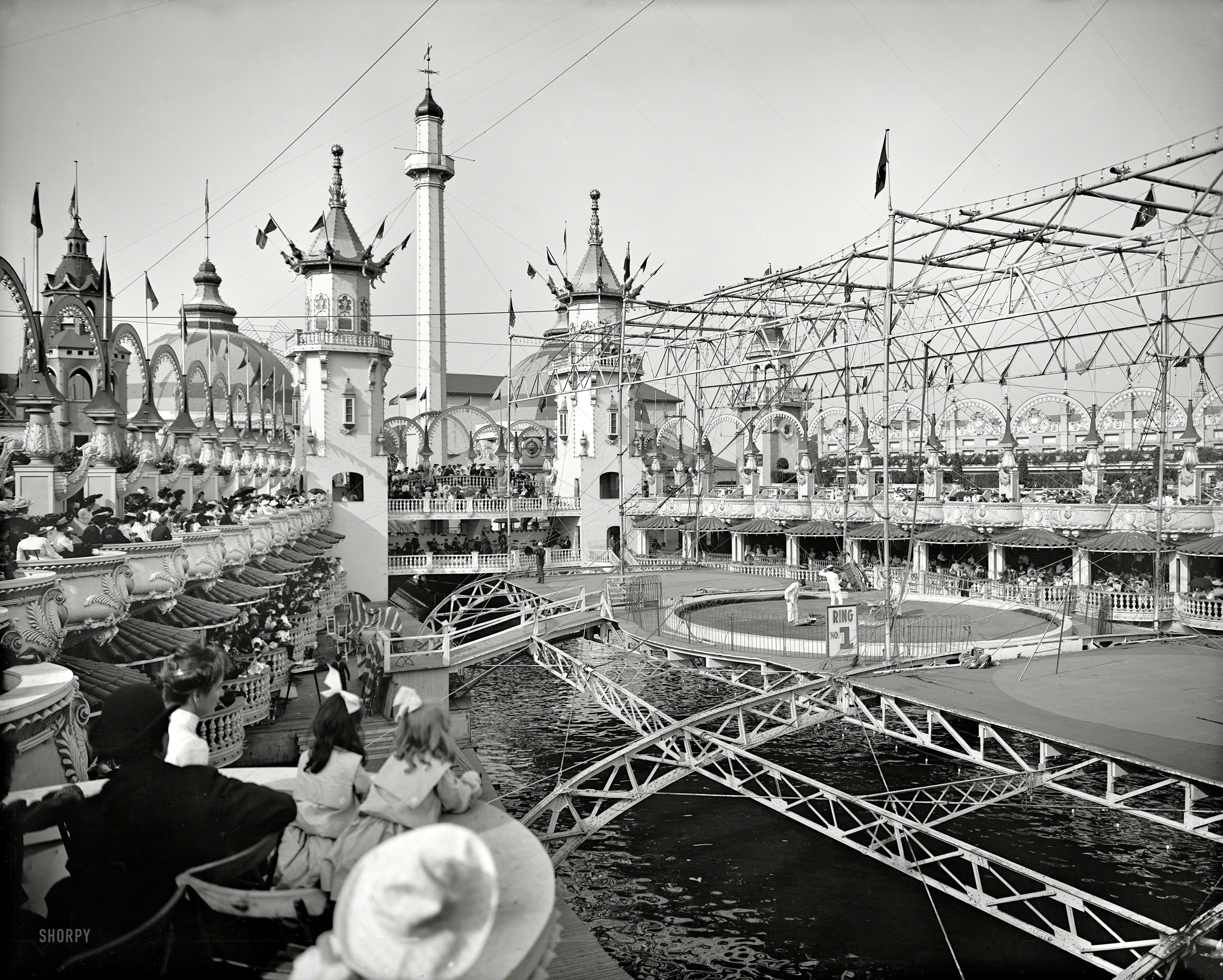
Luna Park in 1905

Because of the success of Luna Park, competition for visitors ramped up on Coney Island. Former state senator William H. Reynolds announced plans in July 1903 to build a hippodrome rivaling Luna Park, and Reynolds opened a third large-scale park, Dreamland, the next year. Reynolds wanted Dreamland to surpass Luna Park in every way. As such, Dreamland featured several times as many lights as Luna Park, an even bigger central tower, more refined architecture, and (according to one source) more "high-class entertainment". At Coney Island's peak in the mid-1900s, Luna Park, Dreamland, and Steeplechase Park competed with each other and with many independent amusements. Dreamland survived until 1911, when it was destroyed in one of the many fires common on Coney Island during the early 20th century.

Thompson and Dundy were constantly changing the park's attractions. Ahead of the 1904 season, Thompson and Dundy expanded Luna Park by 16 acres (6.5 ha), bringing its total area to 38 acres (15 ha). The expansion included replicas of additional locales, a Japanese tea garden, a replica of a Himalayan mountain above the Coney Island Creek, and a $250,000 reproduction of the Delhi Durbar. Thompson and Dundy also added several shows, including "Night and Morning" and a series of pageants hosted on a 700 ft-wide (210 m) stage. A second deck was added around the central lagoon, increasing the park's capacity by 70,000. George Kessler of the Sea Beach Land Company agreed to buy the land under Luna Park in June 1904 for over $1 million; the sale did not affect Thompson and Dundy's lease. Kessler initially took an option on the site; he decided to exercise his option in September 1904. At the time, Luna Park had already accommodated two million guests.

For the 1905 season, L. A. Thompson (who was not related to Fred Thompson) added a scenic railway-style roller coaster to Luna Park, replacing the 20,000 Leagues Under the Sea attraction. Luna Park added several shows ahead of the 1906 season, in addition to two slides. Dundy died in early 1907, leaving Fred Thompson as the sole operator of Luna Park. The Brooklyn Daily Eagle said Dundy's death "was a severe blow to Mr. Thompson". Nonetheless, Thompson continued to add to the park, employing four elephants and 700 men during the off-season. For the 1907 season, Thompson added a carousel called the Ocean Wave; in addition, he expanded the ballroom and lagoon, and he relocated the entrance away from the elevated train lines.

Coney Island had reached its peak popularity by the late 1900s. The park employed over 2,000 people each season, and it accommodated five million guests a year. The park had sold 31 million tickets in its first five seasons, leading Thompson to say in early 1908: "I believe this surpasses everything in the history of amusement enterprises anywhere in the world." Some of the attractions were replaced with ten live shows during the 1908 season, including Trip to the Moon. Thompson added another live show in 1909, and he also continued to offer novelties, including elephant rides (which attracted guests such as actor Douglas Fairbanks). That year, New York City mayor George B. McClellan Jr. attempted to prevent the park from staging live shows on Sundays, claiming that the shows were illegal; a New York Supreme Court justice granted an injunction in July 1909, allowing Luna Park to host shows on Sundays.

=== 1910s ===
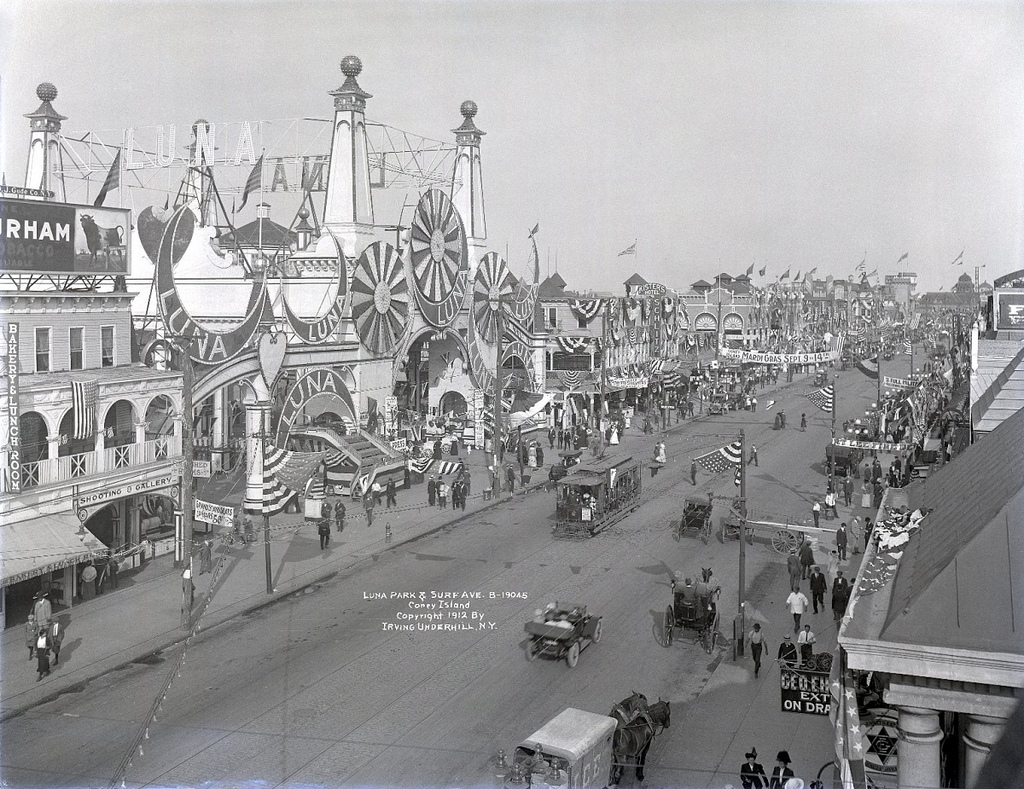
Luna Park and Surf Avenue, 1912

By October 1910, the New York State Banking Department wanted to place Luna Park into receivership because the firm of Thompson and Dundy had gone bankrupt. However, the park's lawyers contended that the firm was no longer in control of Luna Park. A New York Supreme Court justice ultimately declined to appoint a receiver for the park. For the 1911 season, Thompson added attractions and shows such as Sinking of the Maine and the Monkey Music Hall. The Luna Amusement Company, headed by Barron Collier, took over the park about the same year. The park's scenery-storage building, a restaurant, and two rides burned down in a large fire in December 1911, several months after Dreamland's destruction, although the rest of the park remained undamaged. Thompson ran Luna Park until March 1912, when the Sea Beach Land Company and Charles C. Overton moved to evict Thompson; the eviction was finalized the next month. For the 1912 season, the new operators added attractions such as the Kiss Waltz and the Turkey Trot.

Thompson left for San Francisco in 1913, and Oscar Jurney was appointed as the new general manager, working at Luna Park until the end of 1917. For the 1913 season, the new operator added various attractions, including a show called Fire and Sword, as well as two mechanical rides. The following season, the operators added a dancing pavilion and numerous other attractions such as a diving tank. The dance pavilion was so popular that a second level was constructed prior to the 1915 season, and the park began screening movies the same season. Also during the 1915 season, the park's managers added an "Oriental Village", featuring Arab, Egyptian, and Turkish villagers, and a "village of midgets", featuring little people.

Before the 1917 season, the Luna Park Amusement Company acquired additional land, which was used as a parking lot. In addition, the park's managers installed the Top, a massive steel structure that was designed to resemble a spinning top. The toboggan and burro rides were destroyed in a fire in August 1917, and a set for a mountain range burned down in March 1918. As a result of the first fire, the toboggan and burro rides were rebuilt. During the 1918 season, Luna Park's managers added several attractions about World War I, including a simulated battlefield. The next year, Luna Park installed more war-related attractions, and Henry Miller was appointed as the park's general manager. The park also added shows such as the Darktown Follies and A Trip to Me-Lo-Die, as well as attractions including the Frolic, Over the Top (a variant of the Virginia Reel), the Tanks, and Treat-'em-Rough.

=== 1920s ===
For the 1920 season, the park's managers added several funhouse-style attractions, including a tall slide and a children's figure-eight slide. The park also added novelties such as the Pig Slide, a Shoot the Chute-style attraction that featured small pigs rather than people. The park's shows during the early 1920s included China's Fairy Fountains, a monkey orchestra, dancing ponies, and trained leopards. Luna Park added more shows in 1922, such as trained lions, trained tigers, "Skia the Perfect Woman", and "Trip to China". By 1923, the park had over 100 attractions, including nine theaters and 23 rides. The opening of the Riegelmann Boardwalk, the same year, caused patronage at Luna Park to increase. Arthur Jarvis was appointed as the park's general manager in 1924. Under Jarvis's management, the park added a roller coaster called the Sky Chaser, and it built a picnic grove, a grandstand, and an athletic field. In addition, two entrances to Luna Park were constructed to serve the new attractions. During the same season, actress Mary Pickford sponsored the construction of a play area for children who had gotten lost. Jarvis soon made further changes, including replacing the carousel and installing the Custer Cars, Skooter, and Tumblebug rides.

The 1925 season saw the addition of a Samoan village, an Egyptian village, and a wild-west show. Shows such as hula performances and the Charleston Chateau were added during the 1926 season, at which point the park was expanded to 50 acres (20 ha). In addition, the park added a saltwater swimming pool in 1926. Herbert Evans, the park's longtime amusement manager, was rehired in 1928 and immediately announced plans for additional rides at Luna Park. Evans indicated that he would reduce the park's admission fees, relocate several shows to Surf Avenue, give four free-admission shows per day, and replace the underused athletic field with a parking lot. The park spent $250,000 on improvements ahead of the 1929 season, installing attractions such as a court of nations.

=== 1930s ===
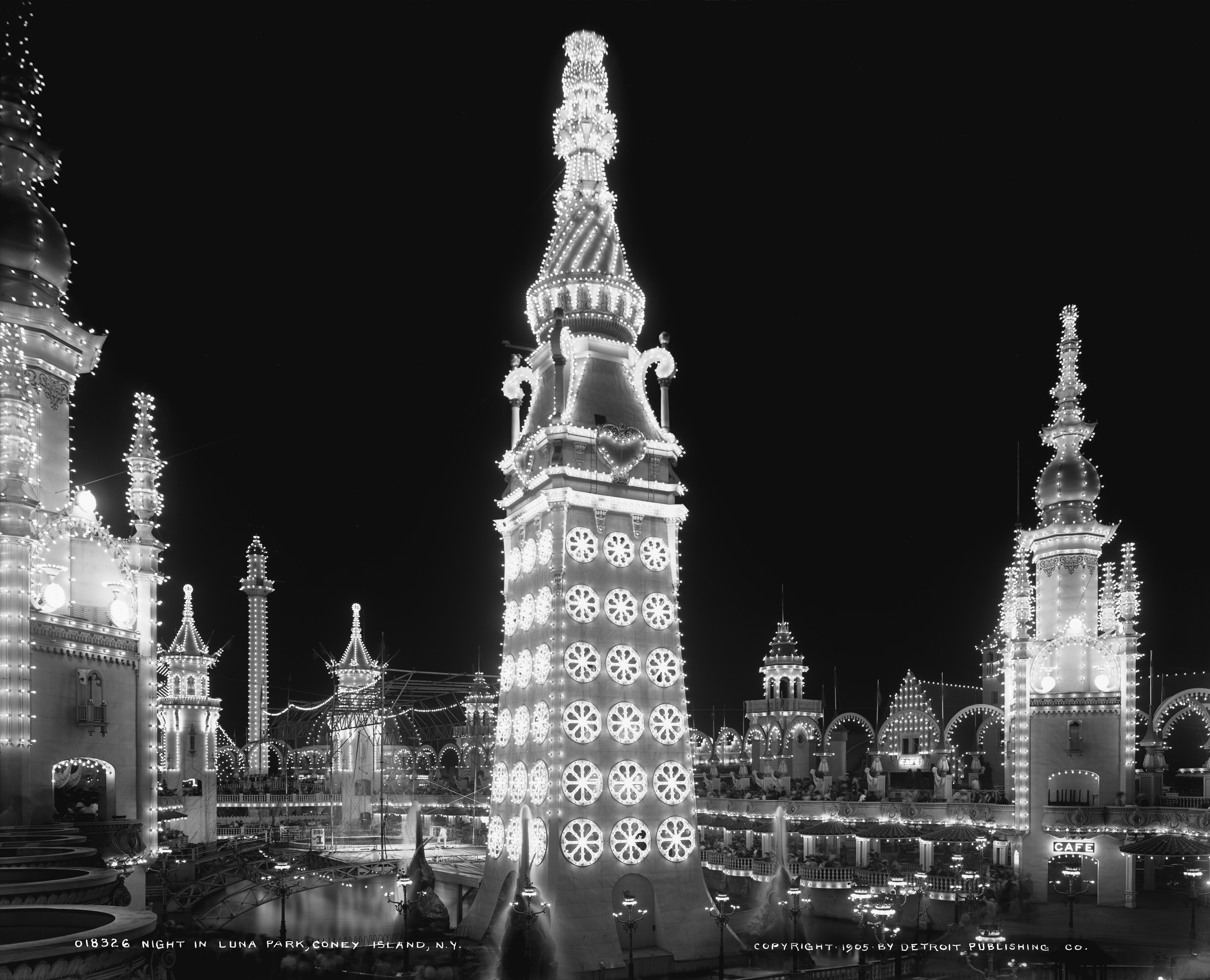
Interior of Luna Park, with the "Electric Tower" in the foreground

Ahead of the 1930 season, Luna Park's managers installed a large cyclorama depicting Richard E. Byrd's Antarctic base, and they installed a Lindy-Loop ride. Rex D. Billings was appointed as the park's general manager the following year. For the 1931 season, the park added attractions like a Dodge 'Em ride, a dark ride called the Pretzel, and a South Pole panorama. Luna Park struggled financially in the early 1930s, having been unable to profit from children's rides, cockroach racing, marionette shows, or roller skating. To attract visitors, Luna Park reduced admission fees for many attractions. During the Great Depression, three of the park's creditors filed a bankruptcy petition against Luna Park in 1933, asking a federal court to place the park into receivership. The proceeding was a friendly receivership, which allowed the Luna Amusement Company to continue operating the park. At the time, the park reportedly had $1.25 million in liabilities and had incurred a net loss during the preceding three seasons.

Billings made several modifications to the park before the 1933 season, including installing a skating rink in the Fun House and adding a beer garden. Every year, Luna Park had traditionally opened on the Saturday closest to May 15, but the receivership proceeding had delayed the opening of the 1933 season by one month. Most of Luna Park was closed during 1934, amid a poor season for Coney Island's amusement-ride industry; half of the rides were gated off, and the park did not host any live shows. Prior to the beginning of the 1935 season, the park's operators added a variety of rides and attractions, spending $70,000 in total. The manager, Charles R. Miller, reported that Luna Park's revenue during 1935 was at its highest level in six years, in part because of the presence of new basketball and handball courts, a large swimming pool, and new shows.

Luna Park's operators added more attractions during 1937, including two funhouses and an assortment of flat rides, but they were unable to compete with Coney Island's beach, which charged no admission and was consequently more popular among travelers. The following year, Miller added vaudeville shows and replaced the Streets of Paris attraction with a concert space called Willow Green. Collier owned the park until his death in March 1939. The park had gone into receivership the prior month when the Prudence Bonds Corporation foreclosed on a $400,000 mortgage that was placed on the park. Jack and Irving Rosenthal, operators of Palisades Amusement Park, considered taking over Luna Park at that time. The park ultimately reopened in June 1939 after Harry Meinch, Silvio Pinto, and Walter Burgess leased Luna Park from its creditors. For the previous two seasons, only a small section of the park was open to the public.

=== Early 1940s ===
Milton Sheen, the park's manager, announced plans in early 1940 to renovate Luna Park for $100,000. Later that year, Sheen announced plans to relocate at least eight attractions from the 1939 New York World's Fair after the fair closed. Prior to the 1940 season, a syndicate composed of Edward and Harry Lee Danziger, William Miller, and Sheen took over the park, signing a ten-year lease in December 1940. At the end of that month, Miller announced plans to relocate 15 attractions from the World's Fair to Luna Park. The plans also included a building for commercial exhibits, a swimming pool, a ballroom, and live shows. Luna Park's managers ultimately spent $9 million to rebuild the park and install new attractions. Even after the United States entered World War II, Luna Park was allowed to open for the 1942 season, but the park had to keep its lights dimmed for wartime security. Miller continued to operate the park for the 1943 season while his partners, the Danzigers, served in the United States Army. Despite wartime restrictions and increased ticket prices, Luna Park remained popular.

External videos
- Coney Island at Night, Thomas A. Edison, Inc., 1905. Available through the National Screening Room at the Library of Congress.

Several concessions were damaged in a fire in February 1944, but most of the park remained untouched. After weeks of negotiations, Miller and the Danziger brothers agreed to purchase Luna Park from Prudence Bonds on August 3, 1944. The cost was estimated at $275,000; the price included a $125,000 purchase-money mortgage. Miller planned to renovate the park for the 1945 season and rename it Bill Miller's Luna Park. Miller and the Danzigers were not scheduled to take title until September 15.

== Destruction ==
=== Fire and aftermath ===
A fire on August 13, 1944, destroyed much of Luna Park, causing $800,000 in damage. Among the attractions destroyed in the fire were the Dragon's Gorge, the Mile Skyway roller coaster, the Coca-Cola tower, and various games and flat rides. The western half of the park was destroyed, but the main entrance, administration building, swimming pool, and other rides near the park's entrance were not seriously damaged. The undamaged part of Luna Park reopened on August 18 and continued to operate until September 15, 1944. Before the fire, the park's business had suffered due to declining patronage and a lack of new attractions. The few rides that survived the fire also operated during the 1945 season, but the interior of the park remained closed. During that season, Prudence Bonds leased the rides along Surf Avenue to Abe Siskin, Phil Pates, and Chick Guelfi, who renovated the Ole Opry House attraction into a music hall called Little Old New York.

In the two years after the fire, legal disputes ensued over the park's insurance payout, which amounted to $152,000 and was paid to Prudence Bonds. Miller filed several lawsuits, including one to evict Prudence Bonds, who he claimed had illegally leased the attractions on Surf Avenue to Siskin, Pates, and Guelfi. The Brooklyn Municipal Court initially ruled that Prudence Bonds had to leave by July 1, 1945, but the ruling was overturned on appeal in August 1945. The New York Court of Appeals, in July 1946, awarded the park to the Danziger brothers for $135,000. The Danzigers immediately resold the park back to Prudence Bonds, estimating that it would cost $2 million to rebuild the site. The park's interior remained closed, and some of the attractions had been sold or placed for sale, but the attractions on Surf Avenue were still operational.

=== Demolition and redevelopment ===
In August 1946, the park was sold to Morton S. Wolf and Associates. The buyers announced that they would tear down the interior of Luna Park and build housing for military veterans and their families. The plans called for 17 structures with a total of 625 three-and-four-room apartments. Wolf and Associates planned to preserve only the swimming pool, which was the only pool on Coney Island with a license to use ocean water. The rides along Surf Avenue, formerly part of Luna Park, were not included in the sale. That October, during Luna Park's demolition, the remains of the park were damaged in another fire. During the 1947 operating season, Luna Park's facade (including its entrance) was demolished and replaced with additional concessions. Despite Wolf and Associates' plans for the site, construction on the housing development never started. The remains of the park were visited only by "youngsters at play" and a fire inspector who visited once a week. Several minor fires further damaged the park. For instance, the remains of the Mile Skyway were destroyed in another fire in 1948.

Wolf continued to rent the rides on Surf Avenue to Siskin, Pates, and Guelfi until 1948, when Karl Klarnet took over operations. Wolf sold the Surf Avenue frontage to the Bonra Realty Company in July 1948. Bonra planned to replace the old buildings and entrance on Surf Avenue with two new structures for about $100,000. The park's administration building on Surf Avenue remained vacant until May 1949, when it was also destroyed by a fire while being demolished. In January 1950, the eastern half of the site was sold again to Ball Park Movies Inc., which wanted to build a drive-in theater. By then, the site contained the remains of several rides, although all of the buildings had since been demolished. Fred Trump acquired the park's eastern half from Ball Park Movies in October 1950, with the intention of constructing housing there. Trump bought the park's western half, measuring 700 by 1,200 ft (210 by 370 m), in 1953 for $625,000. This was one of several large residential developments being planned for Coney Island at the time. Trump had assembled a 29-acre (12 ha) site, comprising not only the former Luna Park but also a strip of land stretching west to the New York City Subway's Coney Island–Stillwell Avenue station.

Trump had wanted to obtain financing from the Federal Housing Administration, which withheld funding after federal officials indicted Trump on charges of profiteering in connection with a separate development. The New York City Housing Authority (NYCHA) took over the site and announced in December 1955 that it would build a housing development for $200,000. The Coney Island Chamber of Commerce opposed the project, while the New York City Board of Estimate was in favor. To comply with the Board of Estimate's requests, NYCHA revised its plan in early 1956 to exclude the attractions along Surf Avenue. The site was temporarily used as a public parking lot during the 1956 operating season and again in 1957. NYCHA took title to the site in November 1956 and began constructing the housing project in July 1958. The development was converted to a housing cooperative prior to its completion in 1962. A small part of the site, at Neptune Avenue and West 12th Street, was sold in 1960 and became a shopping center.

== Description ==
Luna Park was bounded by Surf Avenue to the south, West 8th Street to the east, Neptune Avenue to the north, and West 12th Street to the west. Originally occupying 22 acres (8.9 ha), Luna Park was expanded to 38 acres (15 ha) by 1904, then to 50 acres (20 ha) by 1926. At its peak in the early 20th century, Luna Park employed hundreds of people and had its own police force, fire department, and clinic. Compared to the original Dreamland, the original Luna Park was smaller in scale but better organized, leading Town and Country magazine to say: "The impression one takes from Luna Park is one of activity and extreme organization." Luna Park also differed from the 1893 World's Columbian Exposition in Chicago, which had inspired many of Coney Island's earlier rides and was generally designed in a neoclassical style. According to author John F. Kasson, "The Columbian Exposition preached discipline [while] Luna Park invited release", even though the buildings at both locations were made of plaster.

Fred Thompson designed the park's buildings with elements from a variety of sources. Thompson did not want to use classical details, saying: "It is marvelous what you can do in the way of arousing human emotions by the use that you make, architecturally, of simple lines". Generally, the buildings were designed in an Oriental style; many of the park's architectural features were adapted from the Pan-American Exposition, including colonnades, loggias, porticoes, domes, and minarets. The park originally contained organic architectural details, such as dolphins (which were placed at the bottom of the park's electric tower) and griffins (which were placed on the Dragon's Gorge ride). Thompson also wanted the architectural elements to exude a feeling of luxury. Kasson and Michael Immerso characterized Luna Park's design as being carnival-like, a deliberate effect intended to immerse visitors. Like Steeplechase Park, Luna Park was marketed as a family-friendly destination; Thompson dubbed it "the place for your mother, your sister, and your sweetheart".

The park was initially illuminated at night by over 200,000 electric lights, installed on 132 towers and turrets; the lights changed color every second. Although Luna Park had far more light bulbs than Steeplechase Park, it was surpassed only a year later by Dreamland's one million bulbs. Luna Park had over 600,000 electric lights by 1908, which was expanded yet again to 1.45 million lights by 1912. The lighting scheme contributed to Luna Park's character and, according to Kasson, "symbolized its topsy-turvy order".

=== Entrance and main court ===
The arched entrance on Surf Avenue was described in The Street Railway magazine as "covering half of an entire city block", with four monolithic figures, one at each of its corners. The entrance gate contained five ticket kiosks, shaped like Roman chariots and staffed by "young women dressed in evening attire and Merry Widow straw hats emblazoned with red feathers". A large avenue called the Court of Honor extended straight from the entrance and was surrounded by 53 buildings. There was a replica of Venice to the right of the court, which included a miniature Grand Canal with gondoliers, as well as a model of the Piazza San Marco. To the left of the Court of Honor were three large buildings, which featured the Trip to the Moon, War of Worlds, and 20,000 Leagues Under the Sea attractions. Other attractions, which housed various shows, the Grand Casino, and the Old Mill and Helter Skelter attractions, were placed alongside the Court of Honor.

At the center of the park in the middle of a lake was the 200-foot-tall (61 m) electric tower that was decorated with 30,000 incandescent lamps. Each of the tower's four sides had 48 illuminated circles. The tower was inspired by another at the Pan-American Exposition, which had been twice as tall and illuminated by thousands of lights. The lagoon around the tower was bordered by a wide, brightly lit esplanade; there was also a lighted terrace with benches next to the lagoon. Two circus rings were suspended over the central lagoon to keep customers entertained between rides, and aerial shows were performed over the lagoon. In contrast to Dreamland, Luna Park generally had narrow pathways. When the park was particularly crowded, patrons were sometimes "compelled to listen to the side show 'barkers'" to avoid the overcrowded paths, according to the Brooklyn Daily Eagle.

=== Rides and attractions ===
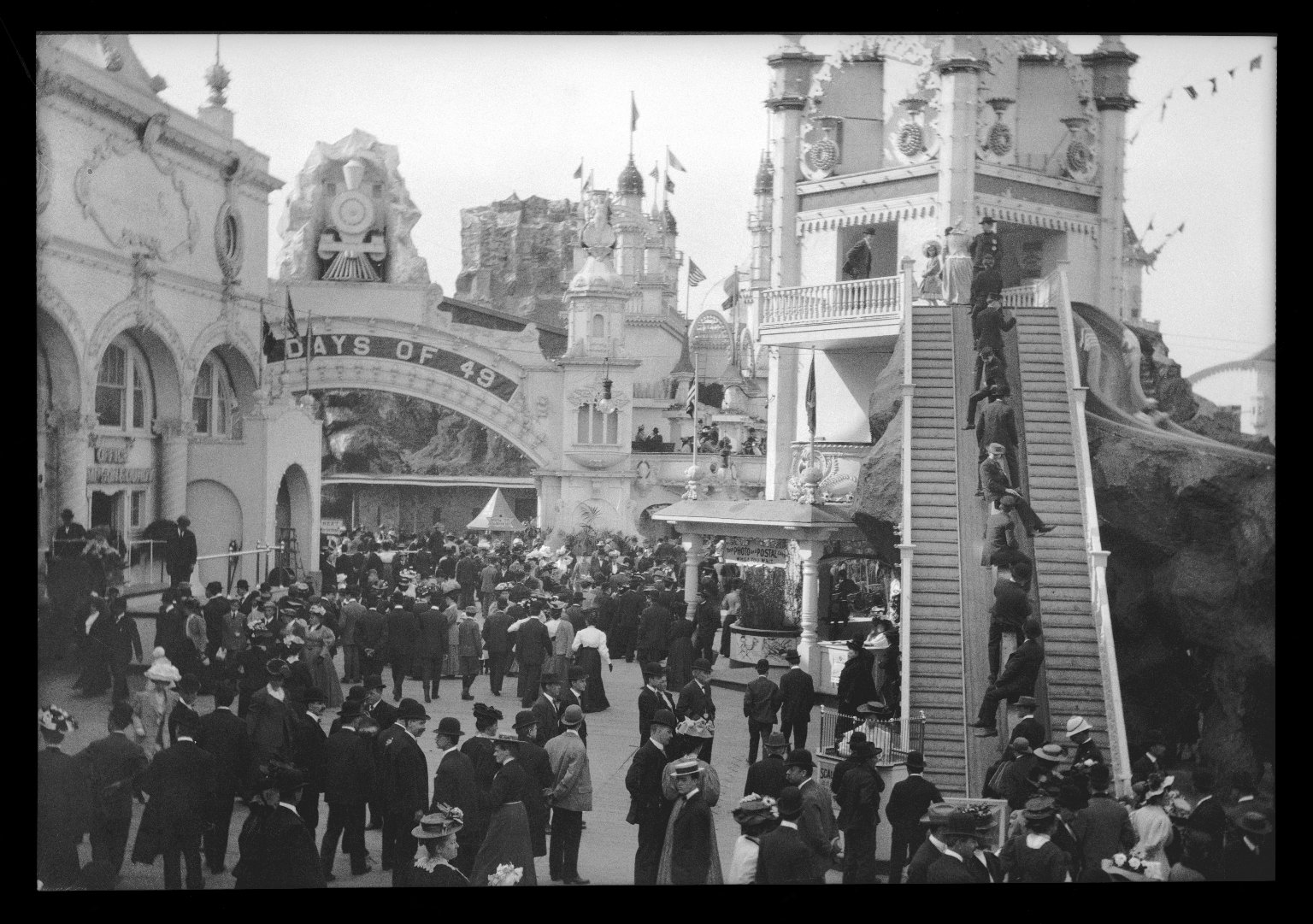
The mechanical escalator to the top of the Helter Skelter

Luna Park had many rides over the years. Among the attractions that opened in 1903 were Bridge of Laughs, an uneven-surface plank bridge; Midnight Express, a miniature railroad; Shoot the Chutes, a slide left over from Boynton's Sea Lion Park; and Trip to the Moon, a roller coaster originally named Drop the Dip. One of Luna Park's largest attractions was Twenty Thousand Leagues Under the Seas, a submarine ride simulating Jules Verne's 1870 novel of the same name. It was housed in a 30,000 ft^{2} (2,800 m^{2}) building and transported guests to a replica of an Eskimo village at the North Pole; the building included a tank measuring 24 ft (7.3 m) deep, and the temperature of the water changed as visitors traveled to different parts of the tank. The park's other original attractions included Infant Incubators, a building displaying a new type of infant care. Canals of Venice, a gondola ride, was one of the original attractions, but did not open with the rest of the park.

Luna Park's attractions were constantly changed over the years. The 20,000 Leagues Under the Sea attraction was replaced with a cyclorama in 1905, and Trip to the Moon was relocated in the 1910s before being moved back to Luna Park in 1924. Other rides added to Luna Park after its opening included:

- "Buzzard's Roost" – a side-friction roller coaster designed by L. A. Thompson; added in 1904
- "Daffy Dill & Captain Thompson's Wonder Ship" – an attraction with a deep-sea monster; added in 1937
- "Double Whirl" – a set of six 72-person wheels attached to a 40 ft-wide (12 m) turntable; added in 1906–1907
- "Dragon's Gorge" – a side-friction roller coaster consisting of a 4,000 ft-long (1,200 m) track in a 200 by 300 ft (61 by 91 m) building with a waterfall; added in 1905
- "Helter Skelter" – an adult slide with two chutes; added in 1906–1907
- "Mountain Torrent" – an early water coaster, which started atop an 80 ft-tall (24 m) mountain and dropped down a series of cascades and ridges
- "Old Mill" – tunnel of love ride; adapted from the Babbling Brook, a water slide, circa 1904
- "The Teaser" – spinning wooden chairs; installed next to the electric tower in 1910
- "The Tickler" – large round tub that rolled downhill through a winding fence lined path; added in 1907
- "The Top" – a massive spinning wheel, which weighed 45 short tons (40 long tons; 41 t), was 70 ft (21 m) wide, and traveled along a 3,200 ft-long (980 m) track. The ride was added in 1917 and removed after 1921.
- "A Trip to Mars by Aeroplane" – simulation of a Curtiss plane that traveled from Governors Island to Mars; added circa 1909
- "Virginia Reel" – a side-friction roller coaster with circular spinning cars that zigzagged down a track. Added in 1908, the ride was invented by the park's superintendent Henry Elmer Riehl, who named it after his daughter.
- "Witching Waves" – small cars propelled by an undulating floor; added in 1907

=== Shows, exhibits, and other facilities ===
The park also had dozens of live shows over the years. Two park attendants maintained each show. When Luna Park opened, its shows included "War of the Worlds", a show that simulated enemy ships firing at a replica of Fort Hamilton; "Professor Wormwood's Monkey Theater", which showcased trained dogs, monkeys, and apes; "The Kansas Cyclone", a theater show depicting a Kansas town being destroyed by a tornado; "Fire and Flame", a simulated fire that employed a thousand performers; and "Hagenbeck's Wild Animals". The Durbar attraction, added in 1904, featured a 700-foot-wide stage that exhibited such "dramatic spectacles" as "The Great Train Robbery", "Days of '49", "The Burning of Prairie Belle", and "Crack of Doom". Later additions included "Fall of Adrianople", a show that depicted a besieged Turkish city. There were also various theatrical attractions, such as the Chinese Theater; by 1923, the park had nine theaters.

Within Luna Park was the Rath House, a German-style meeting hall that could accommodate 1,000 people and had a main ballroom, banquet rooms, and reception rooms. The park also contained the Grand Casino, along with the Court of Honor. The park hosted concerts, fireworks, and carnival performances as well. Luna Park also had a swimming pool that, in 1915, was cited as being capable of accommodating 5,000 bathers. Handball and basketball courts were also added after the 1935 season.

The park included multiple sections with small "villages" that housed members of various ethnic groups. For example, there was a "Filipino village", featuring actual Filipino villagers who were brought to New York City, as well as "Japanese, Eskimo, Singalese, and Hindu villages". There were also various sections dedicated to different parts of the world, including landscapes themed to Japan, Germany, and Ireland. According to the New-York Tribune, "the villages of foreigners form centres of interest for many visitors to Luna Park". By 1904, the park also had replicas of Delhi, as well as a miniature Hanging Gardens of Babylon with 25,000 plants and 10,000 trees.

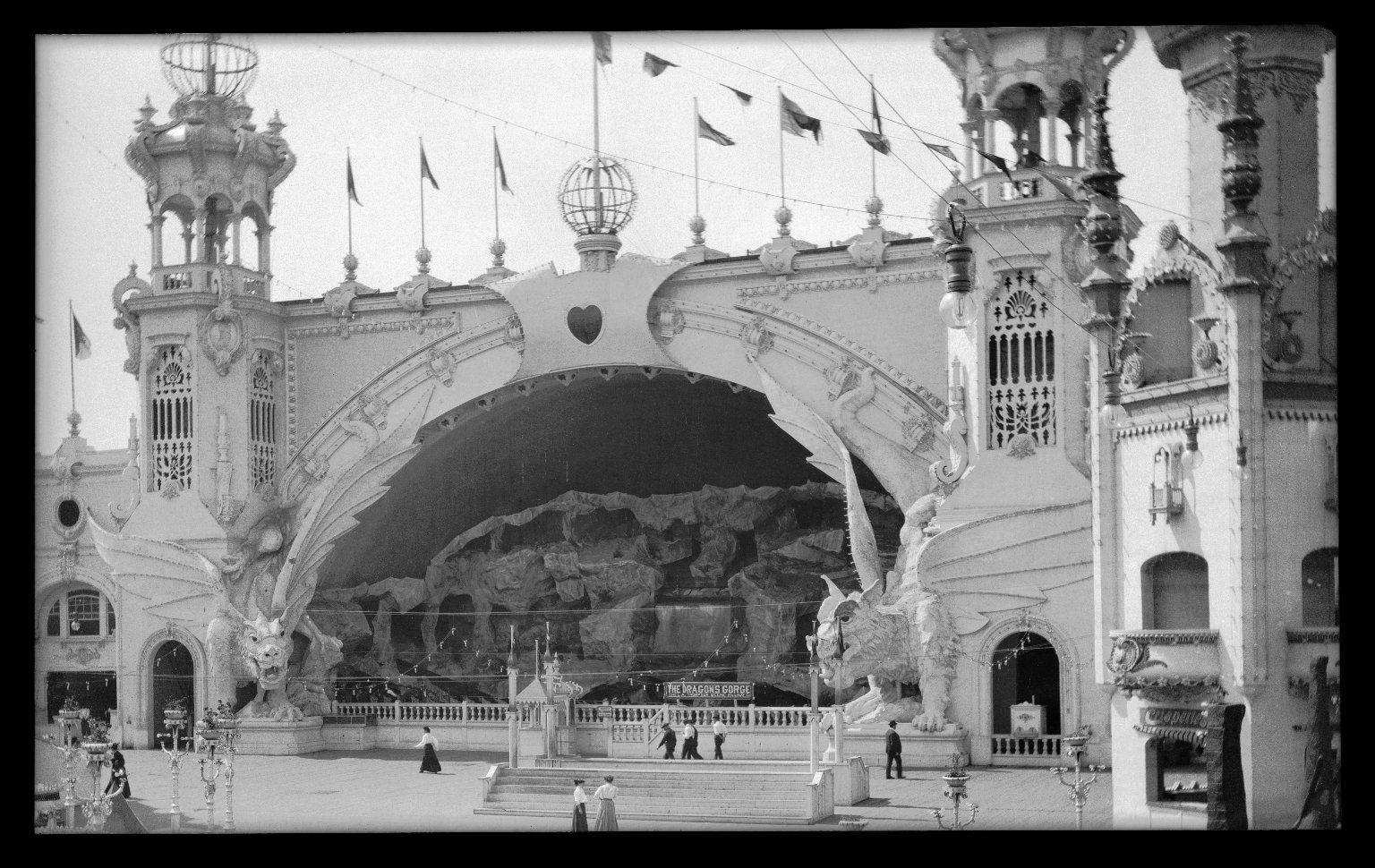
The Dragon's Gorge at Luna Park, whose fire in 1944 led to Luna Park's closure

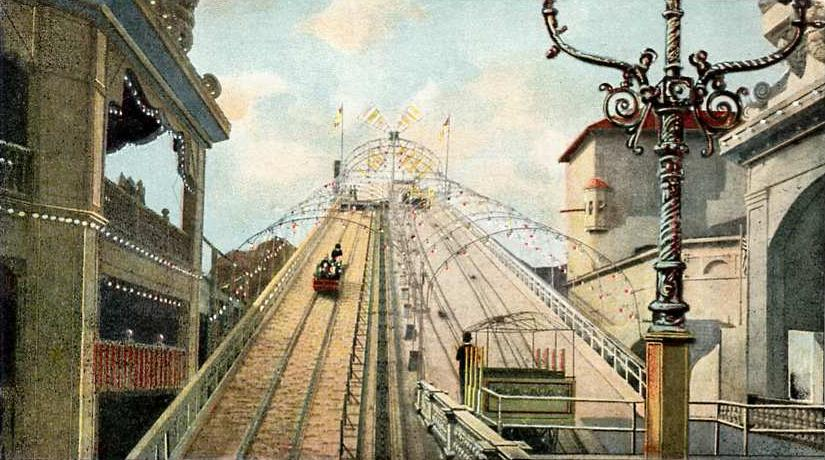
Shoot-the-Chutes ride

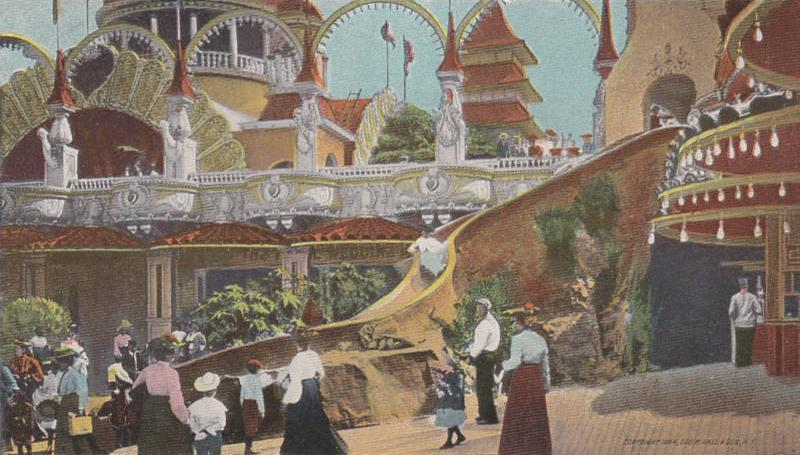
Helter Skelter

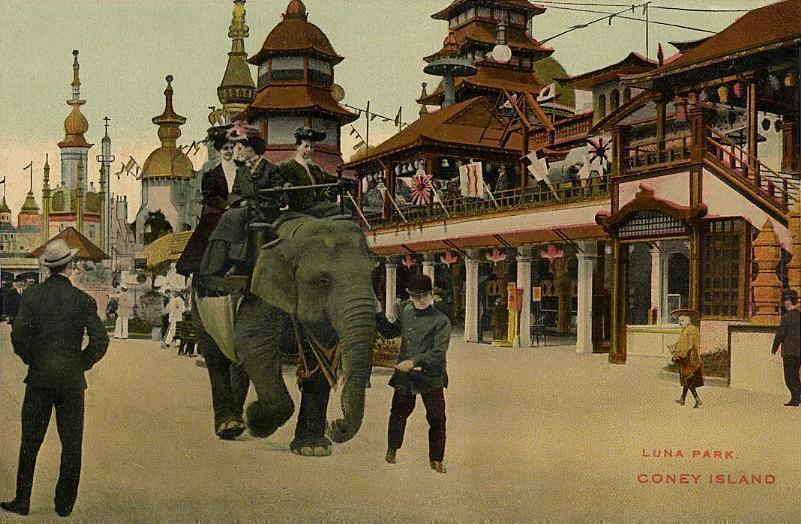
Elephant ride in 1906

== Legacy ==
=== Reception ===
The day after the park opened in 1903, a reporter claimed that "the brilliance and beauty and weirdness of it all beggars description". Soon afterward, the New-York Tribune wrote that the park was "most completely electrically illuminated and most attractively laid out, while there is nothing to which the most fastidious visitor can take the least exception in the way the attractions are presented or attention is drawn to them". Russian author Maxim Gorky said of the park: "With the advent of night, a fantastic city all of fire suddenly rises from the ocean into the sky", while another writer said that Luna Park's skyline "is utterly unlike anything else of its kind in the two Americas". The Tribune wrote in 1904 that "people were at a loss for adjectives and exclamations to describe the City of the Moon last summer; they will be utterly swamped this year." Not all commentary was positive; art critic James Huneker said "every angle reveals some new horror" at Dreamland and Luna Park.

Luna Park's electric tower inspired the construction of similar towers at Steeplechase Park and Dreamland. Billboard magazine described Luna Park and Dreamland in 1904 as the "twin sisters of magnificence"; the same magazine, in 1918, characterized Luna Park as a "real World's Fair". Luna Park became so closely associated with Coney Island's amusements that, in 1921, the Standard Union called it "the heart of Coney Island". In 1991, New York Times critic Walter Goodman described Luna Park as "a blazing architectural jumble, from Romanesque to Art Nouveau, alive with aerialists, tightrope walkers, jugglers and elephants." John Kasson wrote in 1978 that, similar to the ornate vaudeville theaters and movie palaces of the early 20th century, "Luna appealed to popular notions of magnificence".

=== Media ===
Before the park opened, it was featured in the short silent comedy Rube and Mandy at Coney Island. The song "Meet Me Down At Luna, Lena" was recorded by Billy Murray in 1905 to promote the park, among others. Roscoe Arbuckle's 1917 silent Coney Island featured Luna Park. The 1926 First National Pictures production, Just Another Blonde, was shot in part on location at the amusement park, with characters in the film, such as Blackie played by Louise Brooks, playing a shooting gallery attendant. The 1928 Oscar-nominated King Vidor movie The Crowd includes scenes filmed at Luna Park, and part of Harold Lloyd's 1928 movie Speedy was also shot at the park.

=== Namesakes ===
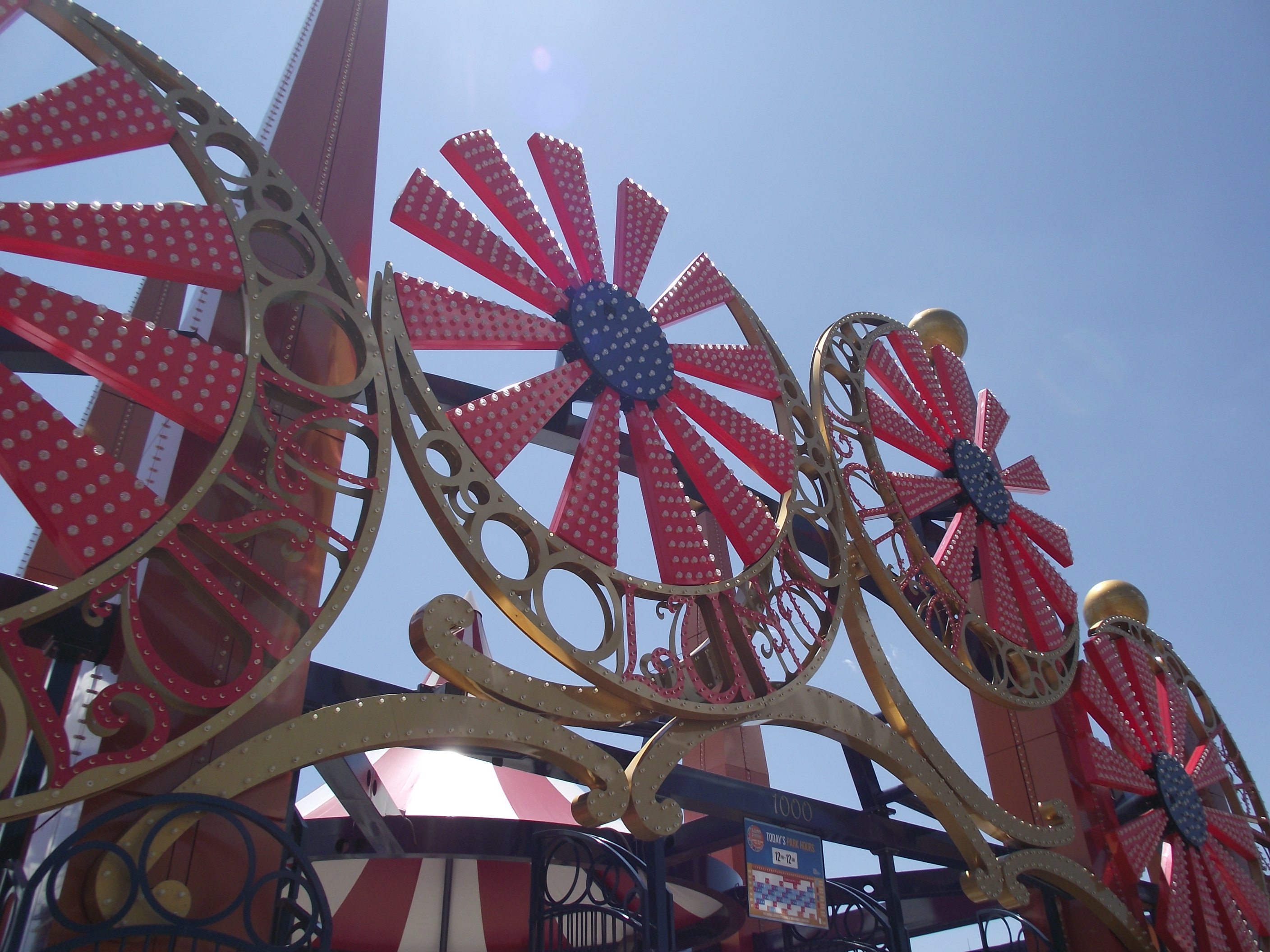
Modern Luna Park entrance

The original Luna Park site contains a cooperative apartment complex called Luna Park Houses, completed in 1962. When built, the development contained five 20-story buildings with a total of 1,576 units, each with between one and three bedrooms. Each of the four buildings consists of four wings, which radiate from a core with three elevators and 100 ft-long (30 m) balconies on each floor.

Coney Island's original Luna Park shares its name with dozens of parks around the world. Carroll Purcell wrote that the name was used by parks in such far-away locations as "Japan to Australia, Egypt to Mexico [...] a chain in Saudi Arabia and a handful of parks in the republics of the former Soviet Union". Another namesake was Coney Island's current Luna Park, which opened in 2010 at the former site of the defunct Astroland park, a parcel of land on the south side of Surf Avenue just across from the original Luna Park site. The newer park, operated by Zamperla, features an entrance patterned after the original Luna Park's main gate.

== See also ==
- Luna Park, list of parks based on the original Luna Park
