= Frederic Thompson =

American architect

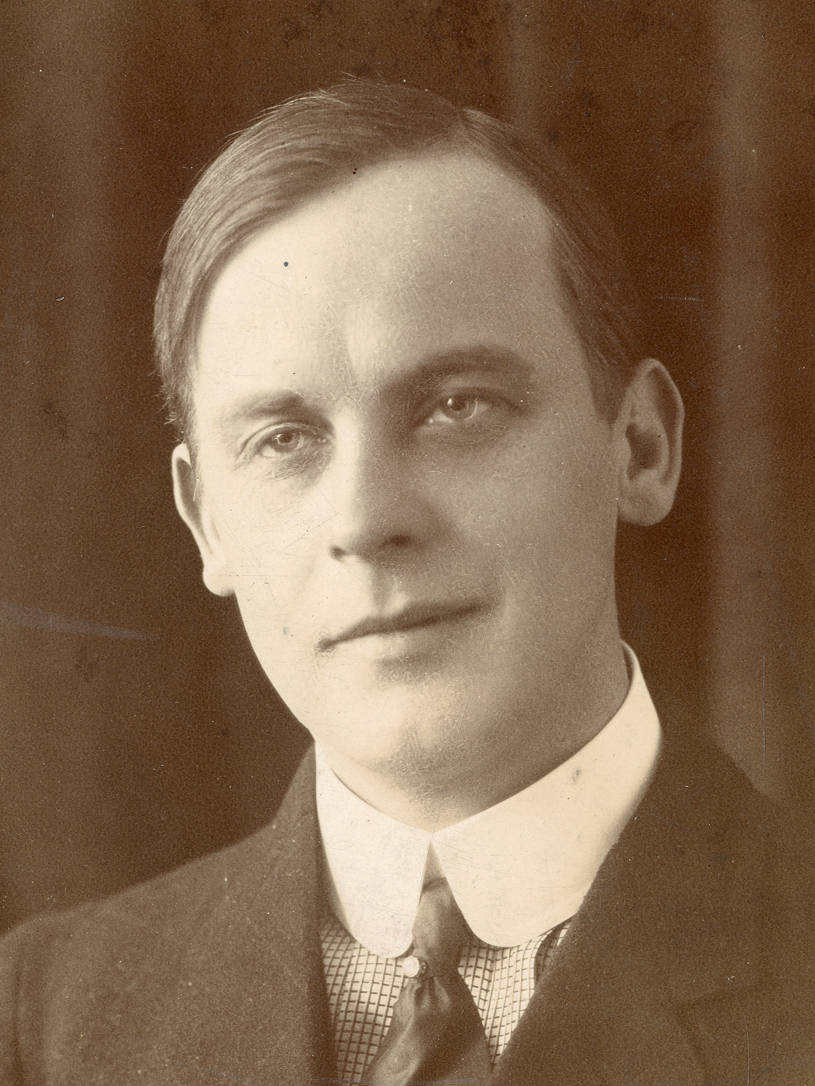
- Born: Frederic Williams Thompson; October 31, 1873; Ironton, Ohio, US
- Died: June 6, 1919 (aged 45); Manhattan, New York, US
- Resting place: Woodlawn Cemetery in The Bronx, New York
- Known for: showman, creator of large amusement parks
- Notable work: Coney Island Luna Park
- Spouse: Mabel Taliaferro (m. 1906; div. 1911) Selene Wheat Pilcher (m. 1913)

Frederic Williams Thompson (October 31, 1873 – June 6, 1919) was an American architect, engineer, inventor, and showman known for creating amusement rides and one of the first large amusement parks.

== Biography ==
Frederic Thompson was born in Ironton, Ohio, on Halloween 1873. His father, Casey, moved the family around frequently working as a manager in the steel industry in St. Louis, Missouri, Johnstown, Pennsylvania, Springfield, Illinois, and Nashville, Tennessee. Frederic trained as an architectural draftsman at his uncle's office and studied at the Ecoles des Beaux Arts in Paris. He had many jobs early on including draftsman, artist and as a salesman in his own business selling building materials and furniture to local contractors.

=== Exposition and entertainment business ===
At age 19 or 20 Thompson traveled to Chicago and ended up working several jobs at the 1893 World's Columbian Exposition. He won a prize for designing a building for the 1897 Tennessee Centennial and International Exposition and also designed his first amusement ride, called the "Giant See-Saw". Thompson showed his flair for showmanship when his uncle got stuck with another attraction after a bad debt called the "Blue Grotto" (a recreation of the Blue Grotto cave on the island of Capri). Thompson drew people into the exhibit by having a recorded barker pitch presented by a novel invention few people had seen, an Edison phonograph.

At the 1898 Trans-Mississippi Exposition in Omaha Thompson designed and exhibited an elaborate moving diorama ride called "Darkness and Dawn". In 1899 Thompson move to New York City to study at the Arts Student's League and worked on ways to improve his "Darkness and Dawn" ride. When applying to exhibit his ride at the 1901 Pan-American Exposition in Buffalo, New York Thompson found he had already lost out to another showman, Elmer "Skip" Dundy, who had proposed his own pirated version of "Darkness and Dawn" and used his business skills to outmaneuver Thompson in getting the midway concession. Thompson then struck a deal with Dundy where they became business partners, sharing the profits from running several concessions on the midway including "Darkness and Dawn", his "Giant See-Saw", and attraction called "Old Plantation", and a new ride Thompson created, "A Trip to the Moon". Tickets for this popular ride were US$0.50 ($19.00 in 2025 dollars) at the time, twice the price of other attractions at the exposition. It was experienced by over 400,000 people before it closed on November 2, 1901. It was the first electrically powered mechanical "dark ride" and one of the first space rides.

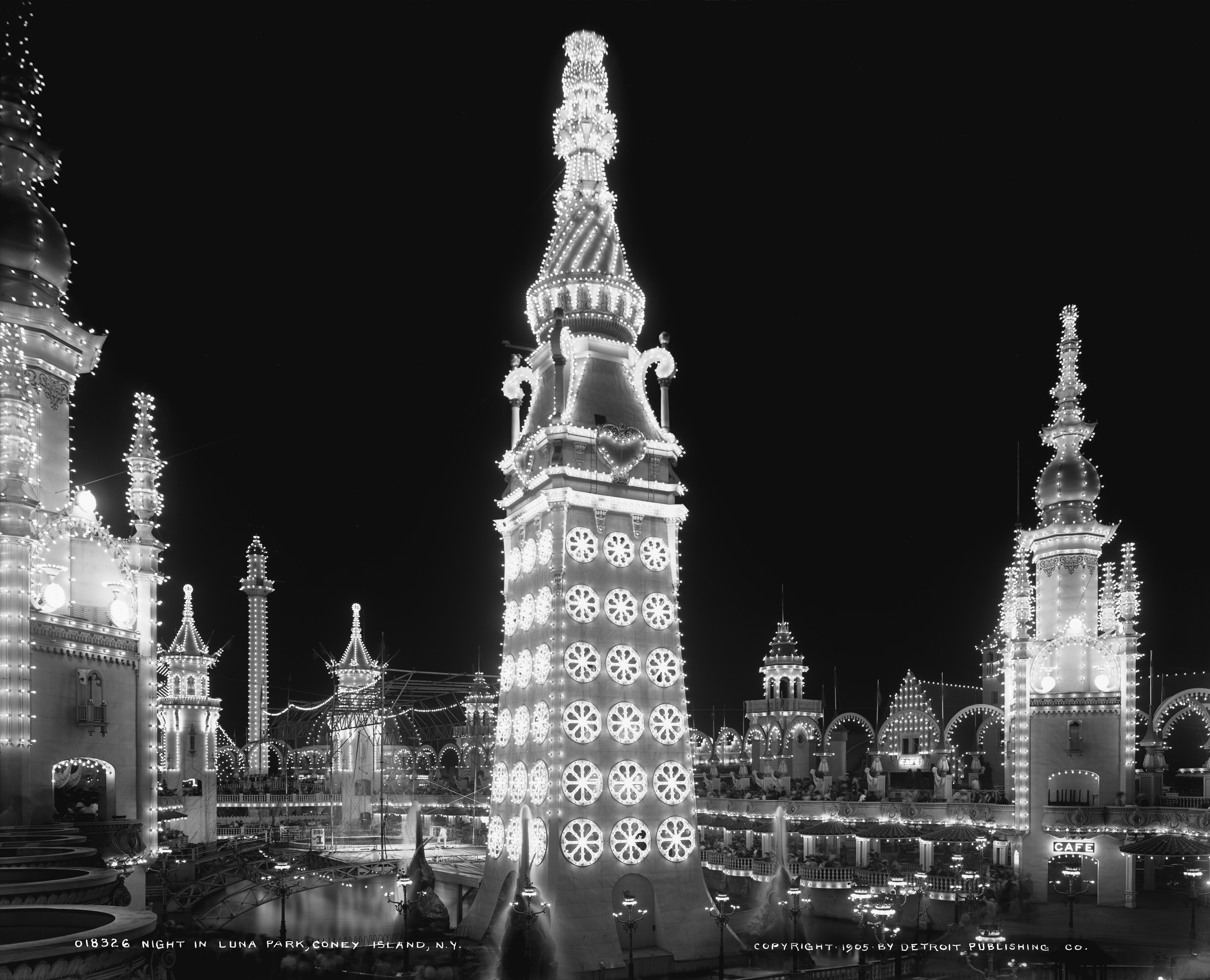
Thompson and Dundy's Luna Park at night, 1905 with its centerpiece, the "Electric Tower" in the foreground.

After the exposition, Thompson and Dundy moved "A Trip to the Moon" and the "Giant See-Saw" to Tilyou's seaside Steeplechase Park on Coney Island in Brooklyn, New York. They went on to purchase the nearby Sea Lion Park. Thompson drew up elaborate designs for the park in a "free Renaissance and Oriental type" and Dundy managed to arrange $700,000 in financing (although they advertised it as $1,000,000) to pay for it. The totally rebuilt park with expanded attractions opened in 1903 renamed Luna Park. In 1905 Thompson and Dundy built a huge indoor stadium in Manhattan called the Hippodrome.

In 1906 Thompson's attention turned away from running his businesses when he married stage actress Mabel Taliaferro. He put his efforts into managing her in such productions as the 1907 Broadway play Polly of the Circus, Springtime (1909) and the film Cinderella (1911). They had one child and were divorced in 1911. Dundy died in 1907 leaving it up to Thompson to try to manage their holdings but by 1912 his fortunes had turned, and he declared bankruptcy. Thompson got a job with Broadway producers Marc Klaw and Abraham Lincoln Erlanger and in 1913 he married Selene Wheat Pilcher from Nashville.

Frederic Thompson returned to the midway at the 1915 San Francisco Panama–Pacific International Exposition with a ride called "The Grand Toyland", but with the war in Europe in the news fair goers were more interested in a bigger attraction, airplanes. Losing money on the fair he returned to New York. Thompson suffered from alcoholism and Bright's disease and after surgery (one of many over a several year span) died in New York City on June 6, 1919, at the age of 45.
