= Luna Park (disambiguation) =

Luna Park is the name of multiple amusement parks (see § Amusement parks).

Luna Park, Lunar Park, or Lunapark may also refer to:

== Amusement parks ==
- Chutes Park (also known as Luna Park), Los Angeles
- Estadio Luna Park, Buenos Aires
- Europark Idroscalo Milano (formerly known as Lunapark), Milan
- Luna Park, Alexandria
- Luna Park, Berlin
- Luna Park, Cairo
- Luna Park, Charleston
- Luna Park, Chicago
- Luna Park, Cleveland
- Luna Park (Coney Island, 1903)
- Luna Park (Coney Island, 2010)
- Luna Park, Denver
- Luna Park, Detroit
- Luna Park Glenelg
- Luna Park Hamburg-Altona
- Luna Park, Houston
- Luna Park, Johnstown, Pennsylvania
- Luna Park, Leipzig
- Luna Park, Melbourne
- Luna Park, Olcott Beach
- Luna Park, Osaka
- Luna Park, Paris
- Luna Park, Pittsburgh
- Luna Park, San Jose
- Luna Park, Schenectady
- Luna Park, Scranton
- Luna Park, Seattle
- Luna Park, St. Petersburg
- Luna Park Sydney
- Luna Park, Tel Aviv
- Luna Park, Tokyo
- LunEur (also known as Luna Park Permanente di Roma), Rome
- Shahr-e Bazi (formerly known as Luna Park), Tehran

== Films, television, and plays ==
- Luna Park (1992 film), directed by Pavel Lungin
- Luna Park (1960 film), an Argentine film
- Luna Park (2024 film), an Albanian film by Florenc Papa
- Luna Park (miniseries), an Italian Netflix series
- Luna Park (play), written by Caridad Svich
- Luna Park, a play written by Donald Margulies

== Literature ==
- Luna-Park, a novel by French writer Elsa Triolet
- Lunapark, a 2016 crime novel by German novelist Volker Kutscher
- Luna Park (comics), a graphic novel by Kevin Baker and Danijel Žeželj

== Music ==
- Luna Park, ballet (1930) by Lord Berners
- "Luna Park" (Pet Shop Boys song)
- Luna Park, a 1961 composition by Tod Dockstader
- Luna Park, a 2011 music theatre composition by Georges Aperghis

=== Albums ===
- Luna Park (2003), by Irish folk group Kíla
- Luna Park (2010), by Portuguese rock band Blind Zero
- Lunapark (album) (1992), by American rock band Luna
- Live at Luna Park (2013), by American progressive metal band Dream Theater

== Other uses ==
- Luna Park, a fictional theme park on the moon in the Futurama episode "The Series Has Landed"
- Cloudland, formerly known as Luna Park, an entertainment venue formerly in Brisbane, Australia
- Luna Parc, a semi-private museum of multimedia artist Ricky Boscarino

== See also ==
- Lunar Park, a 2005 mock memoir by American novelist Bret Easton Ellis
- Luna Luna (1987 exhibition), former art exhibit and amusement park in Germany
