= Luna Park =

Name used by various amusement parks

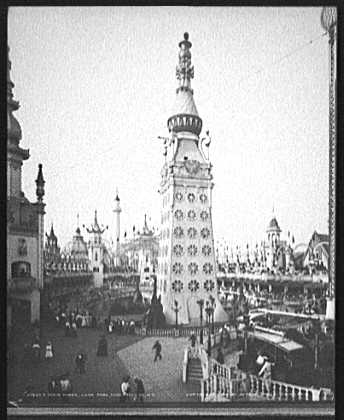
The "Electric Tower", the centerpiece of the original Luna Park on Coney Island, ca. 1905. Many of the subsequent amusement parks that took the name "Luna Park" had their own central tower.

Luna Park is a name shared by dozens of currently operating and defunct amusement parks. They are named after, and partly based on, the first Luna Park, which opened in 1903 during the heyday of large Coney Island parks. Luna parks are small-scale attraction parks, easily accessed, potentially addressed to the permanent or temporary residential market, and located in the suburbs or even near the town center. Luna parks mainly offer classic funfair attractions (great wheel), newer features (electronic displays) and catering services.

== History ==
The original Luna Park on Coney Island, a massive spectacle of rides, ornate towers and cupolas covered in 250,000 electric lights, was opened in 1903 by the showmen and entrepreneurs Frederic Thompson and Elmer "Skip" Dundy. The park was either named after the fanciful airship Luna, part of the new park's central attraction A Trip to the Moon, or after Dundy's sister. Luna Park was a vastly expanded attraction built partly on the grounds of Sea Lion Park, the first enclosed amusement park on Coney Island which closed down due to competition from nearby Steeplechase Park.

In 1905, Frederick Ingersoll, who was already making a reputation for his pioneering work in roller coaster construction and design (he also designed scenic railroad rides) borrowed the name when he opened Luna Park in Pittsburgh and Luna Park in Cleveland. These first two amusement parks, like their namesake, were covered with electric lighting (the former was adorned with 67,000 light bulbs; the latter, 50,000). Later, in 1907, Charles Looff opened another Luna Park in Seattle, Washington. Ultimately, Ingersoll opened 44 Luna Parks around the world, the first chain of amusement parks. For a short time, Ingersoll renamed his parks Ingersoll's Luna Park to distinguish them from the Luna Parks to which he had no connection. Ingersoll's death in 1927 and the closing of most of his Luna Parks did not stop new parks from taking the name.

Today, the term luna park or lunapark is a noun meaning "amusement park" in several languages, including Indo-European languages such as Polish, Italian, Russian, Croatian, Czech, Serbian, Bosnian, Slovenian, and Greek (λούνα παρκ, loúna park), as well as Turkish, Hungarian, Hebrew (לוּנָה פַּארְק, but the term גן שעשועים lit. 'park of amusements' is also widely used), and Yiddish.

== List of Luna Parks ==
=== In Africa ===
Name	Location	In operation	Notes
Luna Park, Cairo	Heliopolis, Egypt	1911 to 1915	The first in Africa and the Middle East. On January 19, 1915, the buildings and grounds were converted into Australian Auxiliary Hospital at Luna Park for World War I. The hospital was closed on July 10, 1916.
Luna Park, Obala	Obala, Cameroon	1970 to 2000	

=== In Asia ===
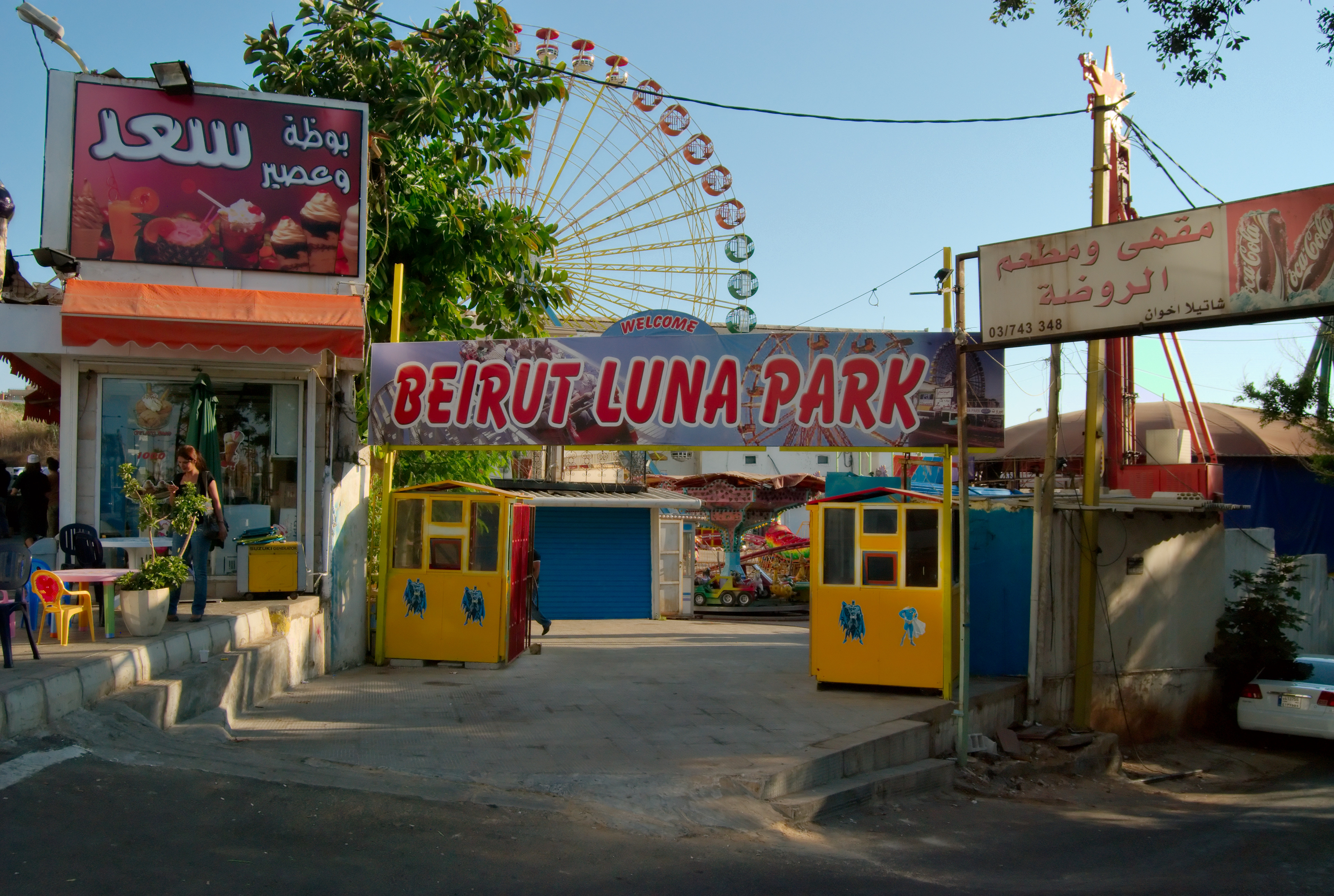
Luna Park, Beirut

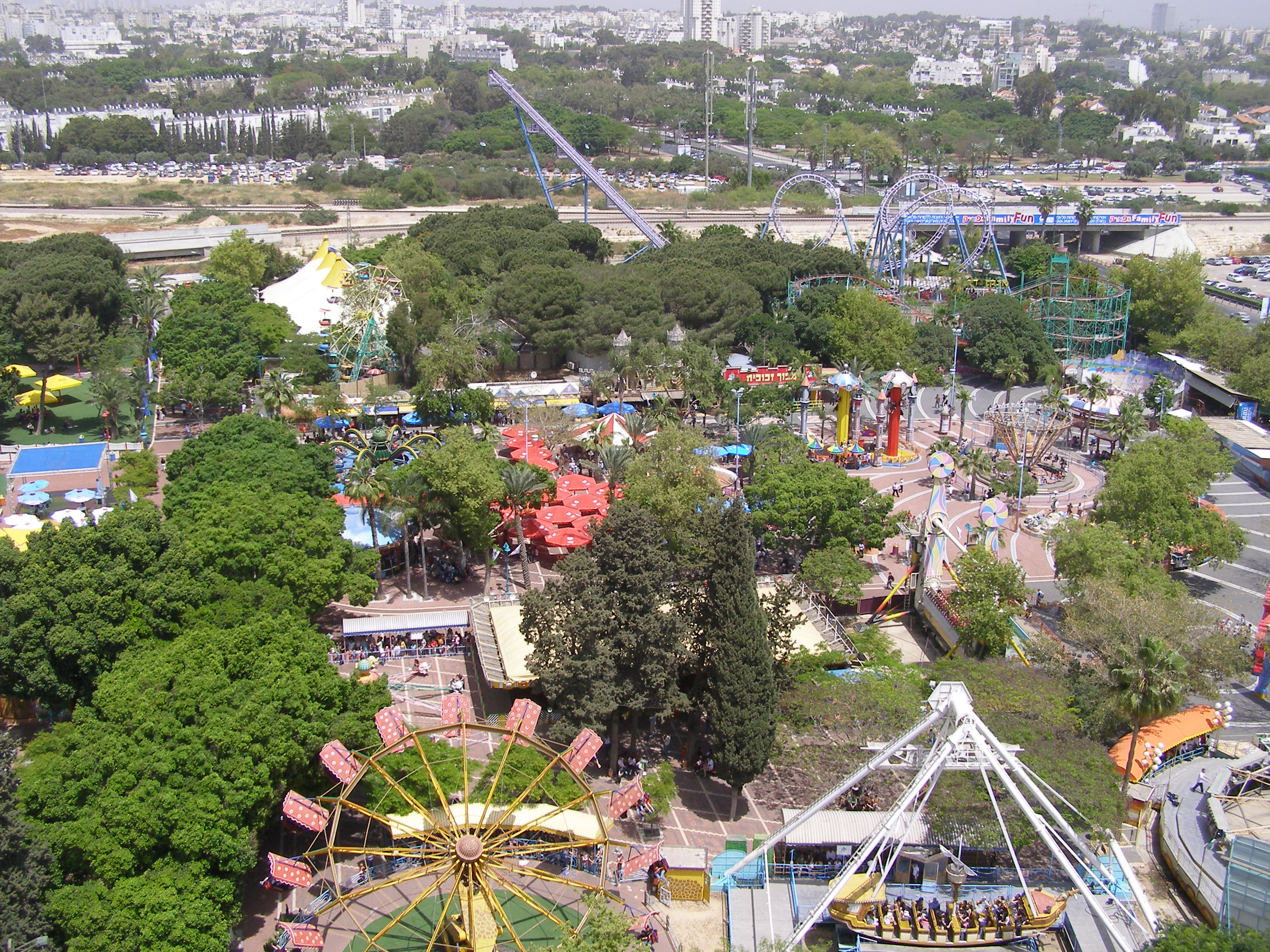
Luna Park, Tel Aviv currently operates in Israel.

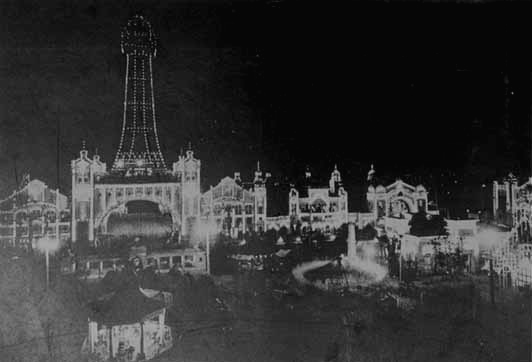
Night photograph of the original Tsutentaku Tower overlooking Luna Park, Osaka in 1912

Name	Location	In operation	Notes
Luna Park, Abha	Saudi Arabia	? to present	Part of the Abha Palace complex
Alanya Lunapark	Near Alanya, Turkey	? to present	
Luna Park, Baku	Baku, Azerbaijan	2000 to 2005	
Luna Park, Beirut	Beirut, Lebanon	1966 to present	
Luna Park, Bombay	Mumbai, India		Designed and built by Ingersoll
Bostanci Lunapark	Bostancı, Turkey	1983 to present	
Eski Lunapark	Near Balıkesir, Turkey	? to present	
Kültürpark Lunapark	Konak, İzmir, Turkey	? to present	
Girne Lunapark	Karşıyaka, İzmir, Turkey	? to 2010	
Mersin Lunapark	Mersin, Turkey	? to present	
Lunapark, Nazilli	Nazilli, Turkey	? to present	
Sincan Lunapark	Sincan, Turkey	? to present	
Bolu Lunapark	Bolu, Turkey	? to present	
Luna Park, Larnaca	Larnaca, Cyprus	? to present	Now known as Lucky Star Park
Luna Grand Park	Haifa, Israel	2001 to 2013	Closed after five months due to poor attendance following a religious boycott and reopened after negotiations with the local religious community. Closed for good on October 31, 2013, to make room for a new cinema.
Luna Park, Tel Aviv	Tel Aviv, Israel	1970 to present	The Luna Park was located in Jaffa from 1953 to 1970, when it was relocated.
Luna Park, Hong Kong	North Point, Hong Kong Island, Hong Kong	1949 to 1954	Amusement park, cinema and nightclub complex
Luna Park, Osaka	Osaka, Japan	1912 to 1923	Also known as Shinsekai Luna Park
Luna Park, Tokyo	Tokyo, Japan	1910 to 1911	Burned down in 1911
Luna Park, Tehran	Tehran, Iran	1970 to 1980	Reopened in 1988 as Shahr-e Bazi; closed 2007 to make room for new highway
Luna Park, Yerevan	Yerevan, Armenia	2000 to present	

=== In Europe ===
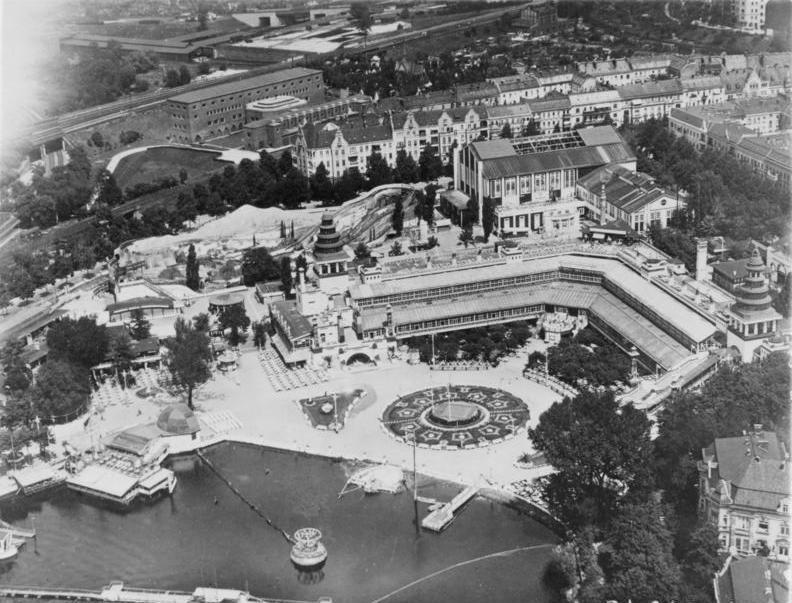
Aerial view of Luna Park, Berlin in 1935

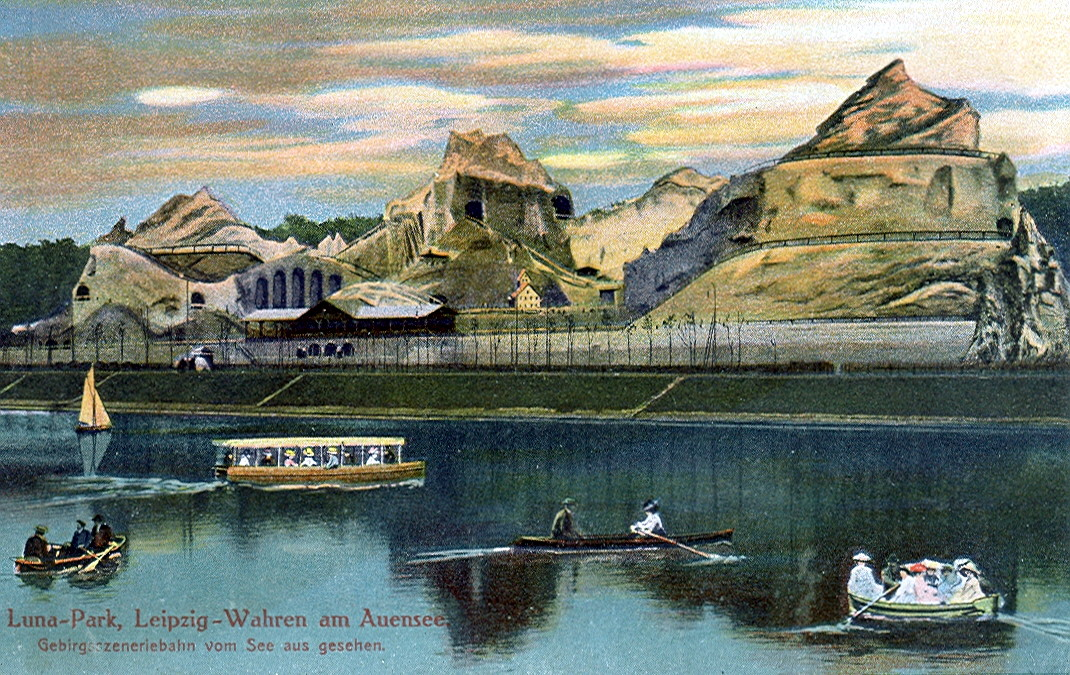
Postcard showing the mountain railroad at Luna Park, Leipzig

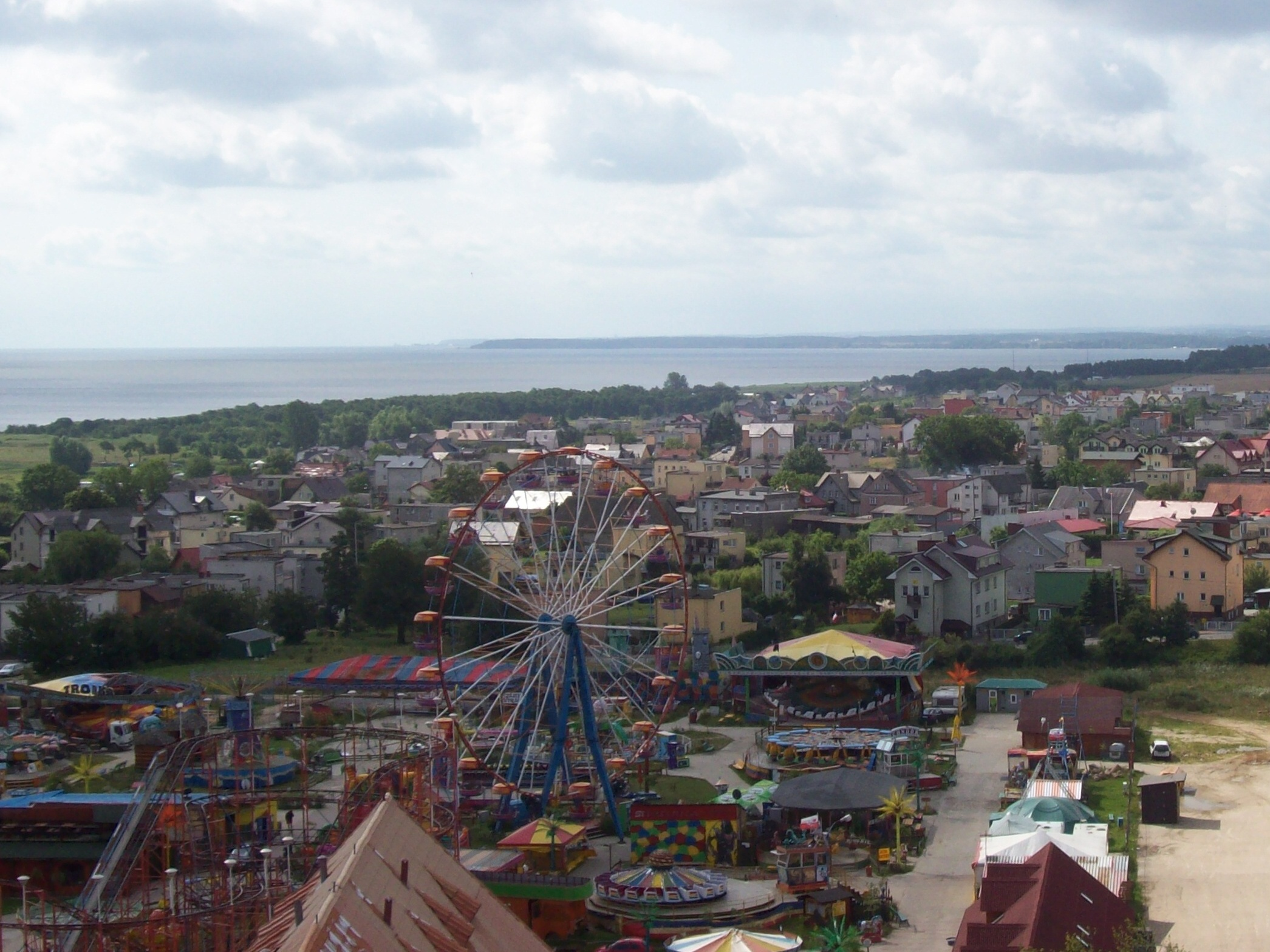
Aerial view of Lunapark Sowinski near Władysławowo, Poland, in 2009

Name	Location	In operation	Notes
Luna Park, Aidonakia	Athens, Greece	2001 to present	Constructed by Ingersoll. Also known as Ta Aidonakia, 'the little nightingales'.
Fantasia Luna Park	Near Faliraki, Greece	2003 to present	
International Luna Park	Near Athens, Greece	? to present	
Luna Park, Brent Cross	London, United Kingdom	2020 to Present	
Luna Park, Berlin	Berlin, Germany	1909 to 1933	In its time, it was the largest amusement park in Europe
Luna Park, Brussels	Brussels, Belgium	1912 to 1914	
Luna Park, Cologne	Cologne, Germany	1909 to 1927	
Luna Park Hamburg-Altona	Hamburg, Germany	1913, and again 1917 to 1923	
Luna Park, Leipzig	Leipzig, Germany	1911 to 1932	
Luna Park, Saint-Brieuc, France	Saint-Brieuc, France	1982 to present	Located in the Brézillet area of Saint-Brieuc, Côtes-d'Armor, France
Luna Park, Cap d'Agde	Cap d'Agde, France	? to present	
Luna Park, Fréjus	Fréjus, France	? to present	
Luna Park, La Palmyre	La Palmyre, France	? to present	
Luna Park, Paris	Paris, France	1909 to 1931	
Luna Park, Argelès-sur-Mer	Argelès-sur-Mer, France	? to present	
Luna Park, Nice	Nice, France	? to present	
Luna Park Funfair	Scarborough, North Yorkshire, England, United Kingdom	? to present	
Luna Park, Geneva	Le Parc des Eaux Vives alongside Lake Geneva, Switzerland	1912 to 1918	
Luna Park, L'Escala	L'Escala, Spain	? to present	
Lunapark, Łódź	Łódź, Poland	Closed January 2016	
Lunapark Sowinski	Near Władysławowo, Poland	2006 to present	
Luna Park, Odesa	Odesa, Ukraine	? to present	
Luna Park, Rome	Rome, Italy	? to 1930s	Designed and built by Ingersoll
LunEur	Rome, Italy	1953 to 2008; 2016 to present	
Luna Park, Milan	Near Milan, Italy	1965 to present	Name was changed April 11, 2004 to Luna Europark Idroscalo Milano
Luna park na Výstavišti	Prague, Czech Republic	1960s to present	
Luna Park, Moscow	Moscow, Russia	1993 to present	Officially called "Luna Park Carousel".
Luna Park, St. Petersburg	Saint Petersburg, Russia	May 1912 to 1924	
Luna Park, Skopje	Skopje, North Macedonia	? to 2022	
Luna Park, București	București, Romania	1920s-1936	First amusement park in Romania, it also had the 1st and only true roller coaster in the country. Demolished in 1936 to make space for a department store.
Luna Park, Liseberg	Gothenburg, Sweden	2022 to present	Area in Liseberg theme park in Sweden, includes rides like Luna, Tempus, and Turbo.

=== In North America ===
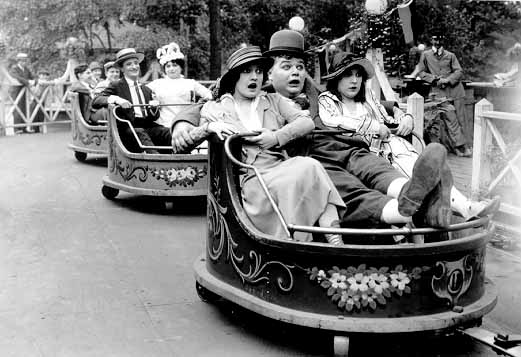
Comedian Fatty Arbuckle riding The Whip in Luna Park, Coney Island, as shown in the 1917 motion picture Coney Island

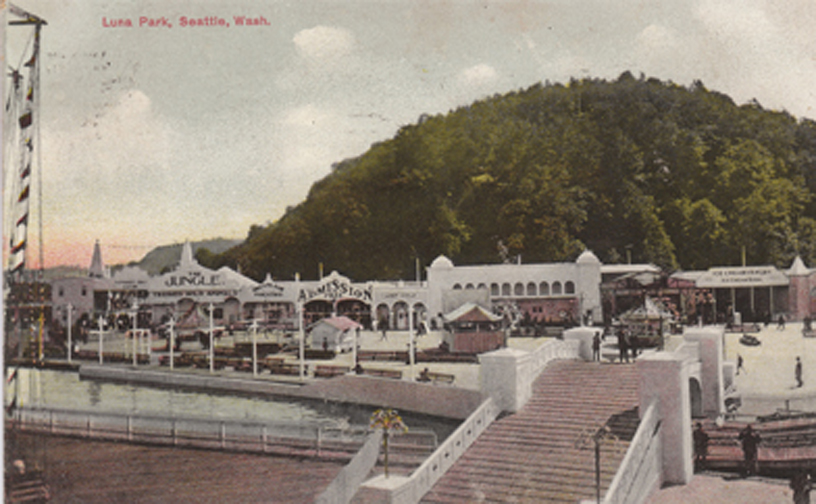
Postcard photo of Luna Park, Seattle entrance bridge

Name	Location	In operation	Notes
Luna Park, Alexandria County	Alexandria County (now Arlington County), Virginia, United States	1906 to 1915	Designed and built by Ingersoll. Some sources refer to it as Washington Luna Park or Luna Park, Washington, D.C.
Luna Park, Buffalo	Buffalo, New York, United States	1904 to 1920	Designed and built by Ingersoll. Damaged by fire July 14, 1909 Originally Carnival Court, became Athletic Park before closing
Luna Park, Charleston	Charleston, West Virginia, United States	1912 to 1923	Most of the park burned down in 1923 after its roller coaster caught fire; now single-family housing.
Luna Park, Chicago	Chicago, Illinois, United States	1907 to 1911	Owned by James "Big Jim" O'Leary, boxing promoter who was son of Mrs. O'Leary of Great Chicago Fire fame
Luna Park, Cleveland	Cleveland, Ohio, United States	1905 to 1929	Designed by Ingersoll. Former site of Luna Bowl stadium for American football and Negro league baseball games
Luna Park, Coney Island	New York City, New York, United States	1903 to 1944	First Luna Park and forerunner of amusement park chain. Now a housing development.
Luna Park, Coney Island (opened 2010)	New York City, New York, United States	2010 to present	Constructed on the site of the former Astroland (across the street from the original Luna Park).
Luna Park, Denver	Denver, Colorado, United States	1908 to 1914	Constructed on the site of the first US amusement park west of the Mississippi River, known as Manhattan Beach (1881–1908)
Luna Park, Detroit	Detroit, Michigan, United States	1906 to 1927	Was actually named Electric Park but also called Luna Park, Riverview Park, and Granada Park (Ingersoll Amusement Center was a separate park)
Luna Park, Honolulu	Honolulu, Hawaii, United States	Closed down unknown time.	Designed and built by Ingersoll.
Luna Park, Houston	Houston, Texas, United States	1924 to c. 1934	Much of the site now businesses near a residential development; the northern and eastern edges now covered by Interstate 10 and Interstate 45.
Luna Park, Hull	Gatineau, Quebec, Canada	1925 to 1928	
Luna Park, Johnstown	Johnstown, Pennsylvania, United States		Originally Roxbury Park; renamed Luna Park in 1905; sold to Johnstown in 1922; renamed Roxbury Park
Luna Park, Los Angeles	Los Angeles, California, United States	1911 to 1914	Was Chutes Park 1900–1910
Luna Park, Mansfield	Mansfield, Ohio, United States	1905 to ?	Also known as Casino Park
Luna Park, Mexico City	Mexico City, Mexico	1906 to ?	Designed by Ingersoll. On the same site as Luna Loca.
Luna Park, Olcott Beach	Newfane, New York, United States	1898 to 1926	Destroyed by fire in 1927
Luna Park, Pittsburgh	Pittsburgh, Pennsylvania, United States	1905 to 1909	Was first of the Ingersoll Luna Parks and first amusement park to be covered with electric lighting
Luna Park, Portland	Portland, Oregon, United States	1903 to 1944	
Luna Park, San Jose	San Jose, California, United States	1910 to 1916	Included a baseball stadium that served as home for the San Jose Prune Pickers and San Jose Bears of the California State League.
Luna Park, Schenectady	Rexford, New York, United States	1901 to 1933	Designed and built by Ingersoll. Was also known as Dolle's Park, Colonnade Park, Palisades Park, and Rexford Park
Luna Park, Scranton	Scranton, Pennsylvania, United States	1906 to 1916	Constructed by Ingersoll. Most of grounds now covered by Interstate 81.
Luna Park, Seattle	Seattle, Washington, United States	1907 to 1913	Designed by Looff.
Luna Park, Sylvan Beach	New York City, New York United States	?	Absorbed by nearby Carnival Park
Luna Park, West Hartford	West Hartford, Connecticut, United States	1906 to 1930	Name changed from White City just before the park's grand opening.
Luna Park, Wheeling	Wheeling, West Virginia, United States	1905 to 1907	

=== In Oceania ===
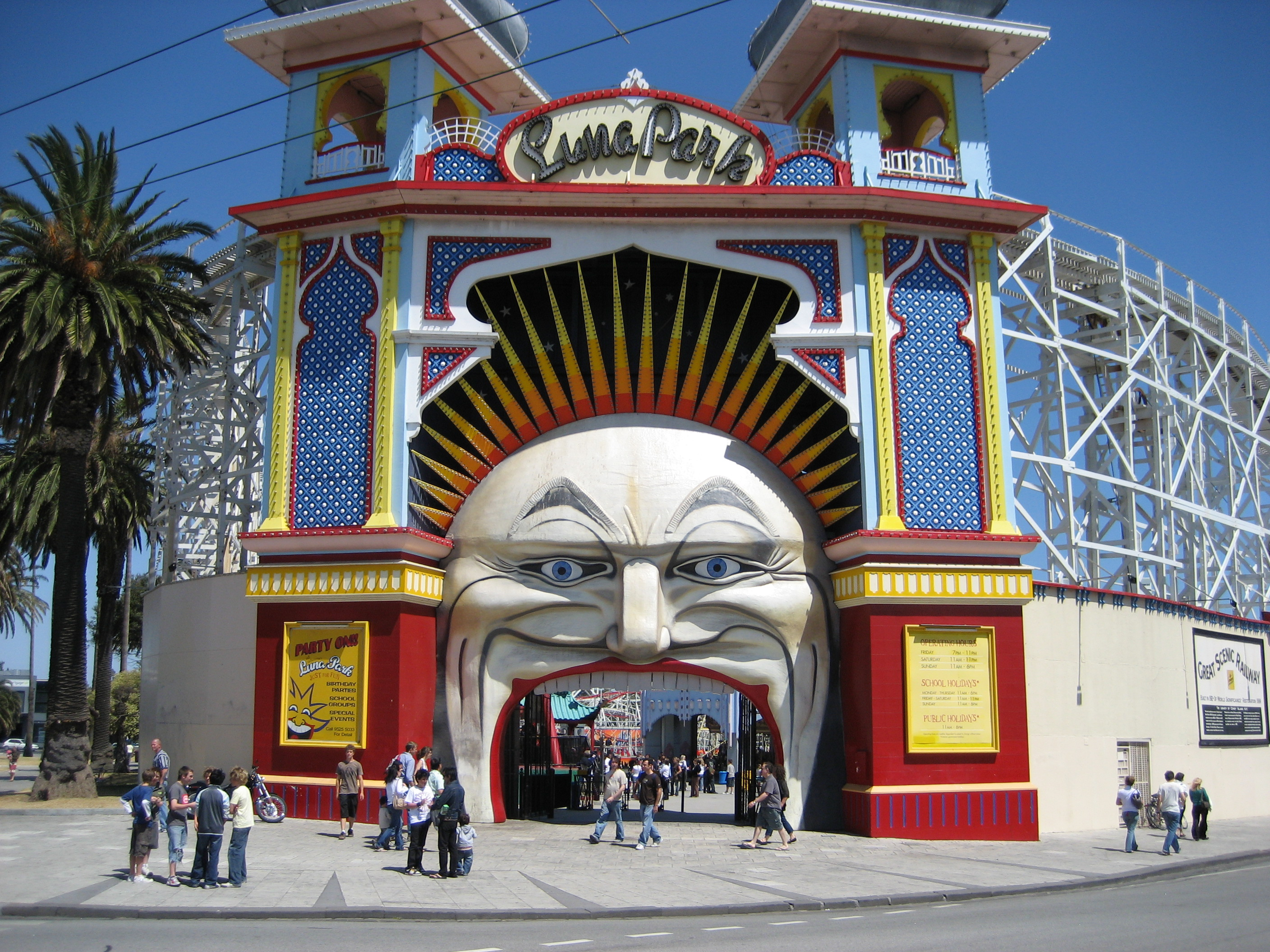
Luna Park Melbourne entrance

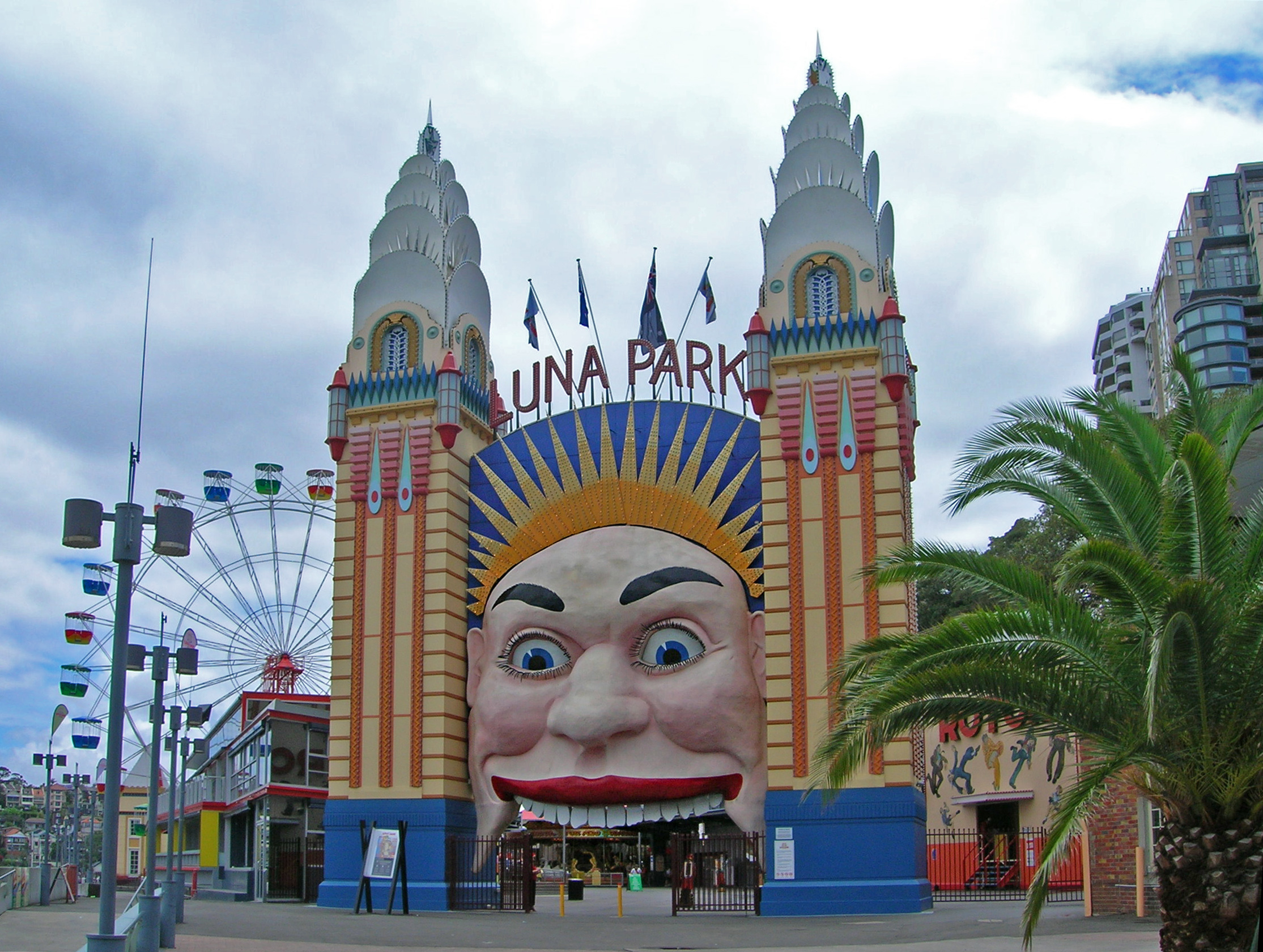
Luna Park Sydney entrance

Name	Location	In operation	Notes
Luna Park Glenelg	Glenelg, South Australia, Australia	1930 to 1934	Closed due to objections of local populace to Sunday operations and expansion plans; moved to Milsons Point (1935) and became Luna Park Sydney.
Luna Park Melbourne	Melbourne, Victoria, Australia	1912 to present	Designed and built by Ingersoll. Oldest operational Luna Park and famous for having the oldest continually operating roller coaster in the world.
Luna Park Redcliffe	Redcliffe City, Queensland, Australia	1944 to 1966	Erected on an unused section of the foreshore just north of Sutton's Beach at Redcliffe Point in late 1944. Owners, Redcliffe Town Council appointed Messrs W. Scott and Philip Wirth as amusement managers. Later the enterprise was sold by the Redcliffe Town Council to local businessman Hal Buchanan who sold it on to the Roman Catholic Archdiocese of Brisbane, which sold it again in 1952. Amusements included a steam train, ferris wheel, sideshows and car-rides as well as a salt-water swimming pool.
Luna Park Sydney	Sydney, New South Wales, Australia	1935 to 1979, 1982 to 1988, 1995 to 1996, 2000 to 2001, 2004 to present	Originally known as Luna Park Milsons Point
Luna Park Scarborough	Scarborough, Western Australia, Australia	November 25, 1939 to 1972	
Luna Park Auckland	Auckland, New Zealand	1926 to 1931	Established on Auckland's Waitemata Harbour, using rides and equipment from the New Zealand and South Seas Exhibition, a world fair that ran in Dunedin, New Zealand, from 1925 to 1926. Due to the depression, Luna Park began to run at a loss and was shut down in 1931.

=== In South America ===
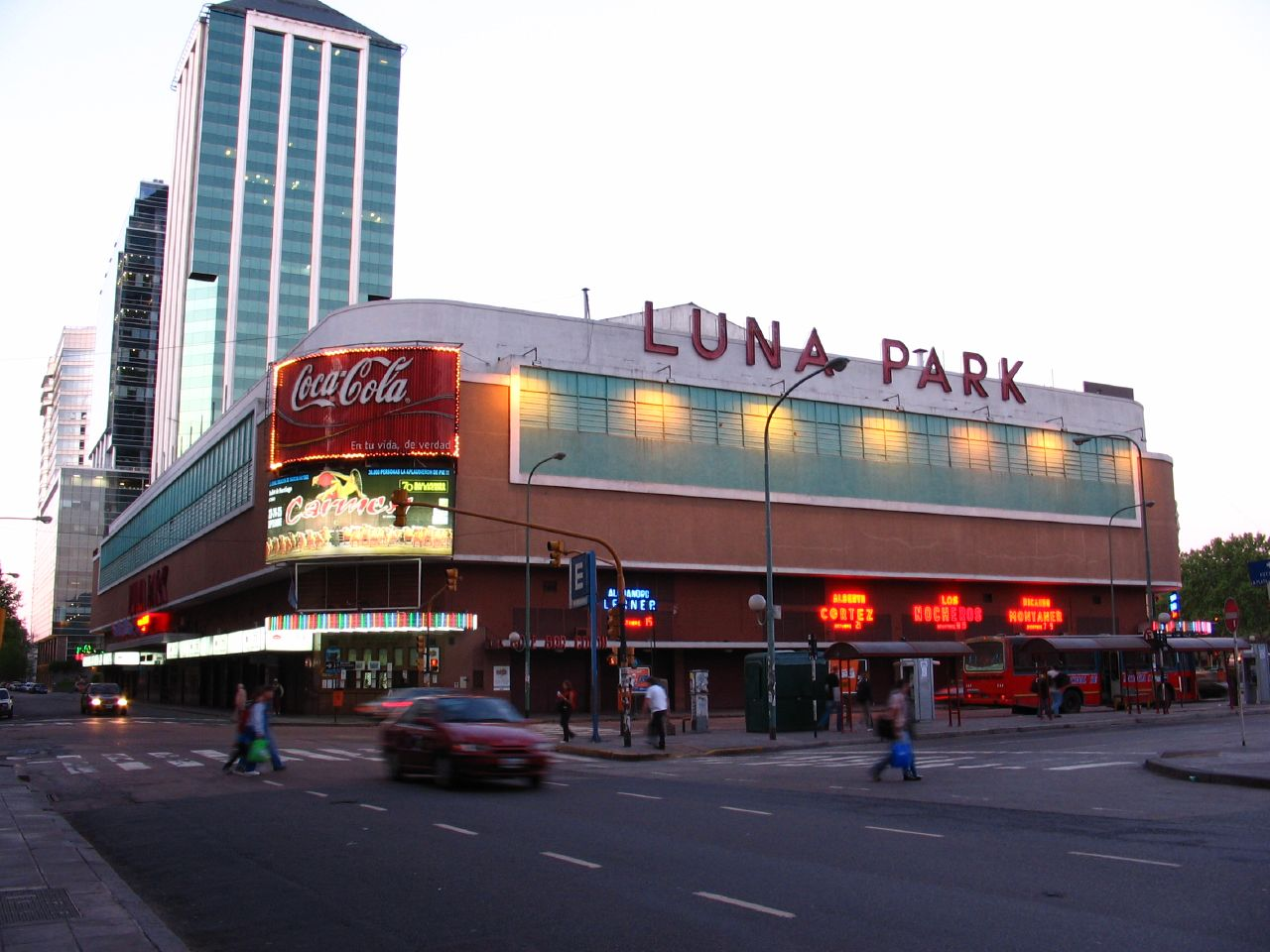
Luna Park, Buenos Aires, 2005

Name	Location	In operation	Notes
Luna Park, Buenos Aires	Buenos Aires, Argentina	1934 to present	Designed and built by Ingersoll. Became site of a sports arena built 1931–1934. As of 2013, it still runs, serving as a venue for stage concerts & presentations, both national and international, and as a sports arena. Acclaimed international shows such as Disney on Ice and the Harlem Globetrotters have performed in Argentine Luna Park. It is known for its adaptability to host ice-skating rinks, multiple stages, sports courts, and others.
Luna Park, Rio de Janeiro	Rio de Janeiro, Brazil	? to 2006	Now used to store portable amusement rides by owner Orlando Orfei; often called Luna Park, Nova Iguaçu
Lunapark, Lima	Lima, Peru	? to 2007	
Lunapark, Lecherias	Anzoátegui, Venezuela	2003 to present	Also known as Parque de Atracciones Plaza Mayor
Luna Park, Santa Fé	Bogotá, Colombia	1921 to 1948	Designed and built by Don Nicolás Liévano where today sits the neighborhood of Barrio Restrepo. The park was built around a lake fed by the Fucha River. It counted with several attractions including the Chicago Ferris wheel, a carrousel, a building for events, and more. Designed to entertain families and children of the south of Bogotá it was also used for parades and events during special occasions. By 1948 the luna park construction company decided to fill the lake and build residential areas on top which was supported by the secretary of public works of Bogotá disregarding the protests by the locals against the project.

== See also ==
- Taronga Zoo
- Luna Luna (1987 exhibition), former art exhibit and amusement park in Germany and Italy.
