= Palace Gardens =

May refer to:

- Palace Gardens, a shopping centre in Enfield Town, United Kingdom
- A dance hall that existed until 1911 at Electric Park, Detroit, United States
