= Idroscalo =

Artificial lake in Milan, Italy

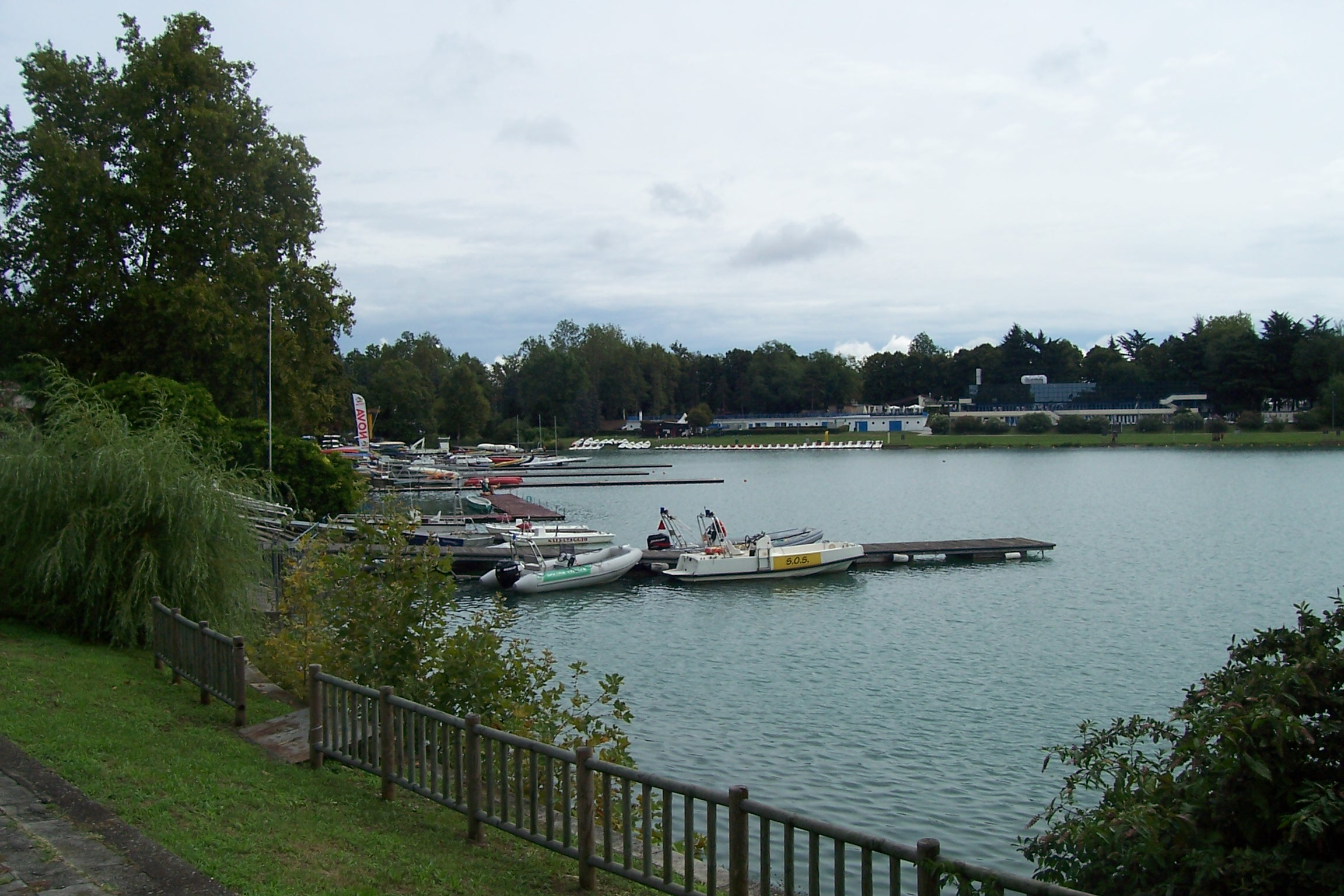
- A view of Idroscalo

- Location within Milan
- Interactive map of Idroscalo
- Location: Milan, Italy
- Coordinates: 45°27′42.32″N 9°17′18.64″E
- Type: Artificial lake
- Basin countries: Italy
- Managing agency: Province of Milan
- Built: 28 October 1930
- Max. length: 2,600 m (8,500 ft)
- Max. width: 250–400 m (820–1,310 ft)
- Max. depth: 3–5 m (9.8–16.4 ft)

The Idroscalo is an artificial lake in Milan, Italy that was originally constructed as a seaplane airport. It opened on 28 October 1930, in the heyday of seaplanes. When the use of seaplanes for passenger transport declined it became a recreational and sport facility. The first official rowing event was held in 1934 while Idroscalo was still an airport.

The lake is 2,600 m (8,500 ft) long and was constructed in the late 1920s. Its width ranges from 250 m (820 ft) to 400 m (1,300 ft) and depth from 3 m (9.8 ft) to 5 m (16 ft). It is situated between the municipalities of Segrate and Peschiera Borromeo, just within Milan's city limits and near Linate Airport.

== Idroscalo today ==
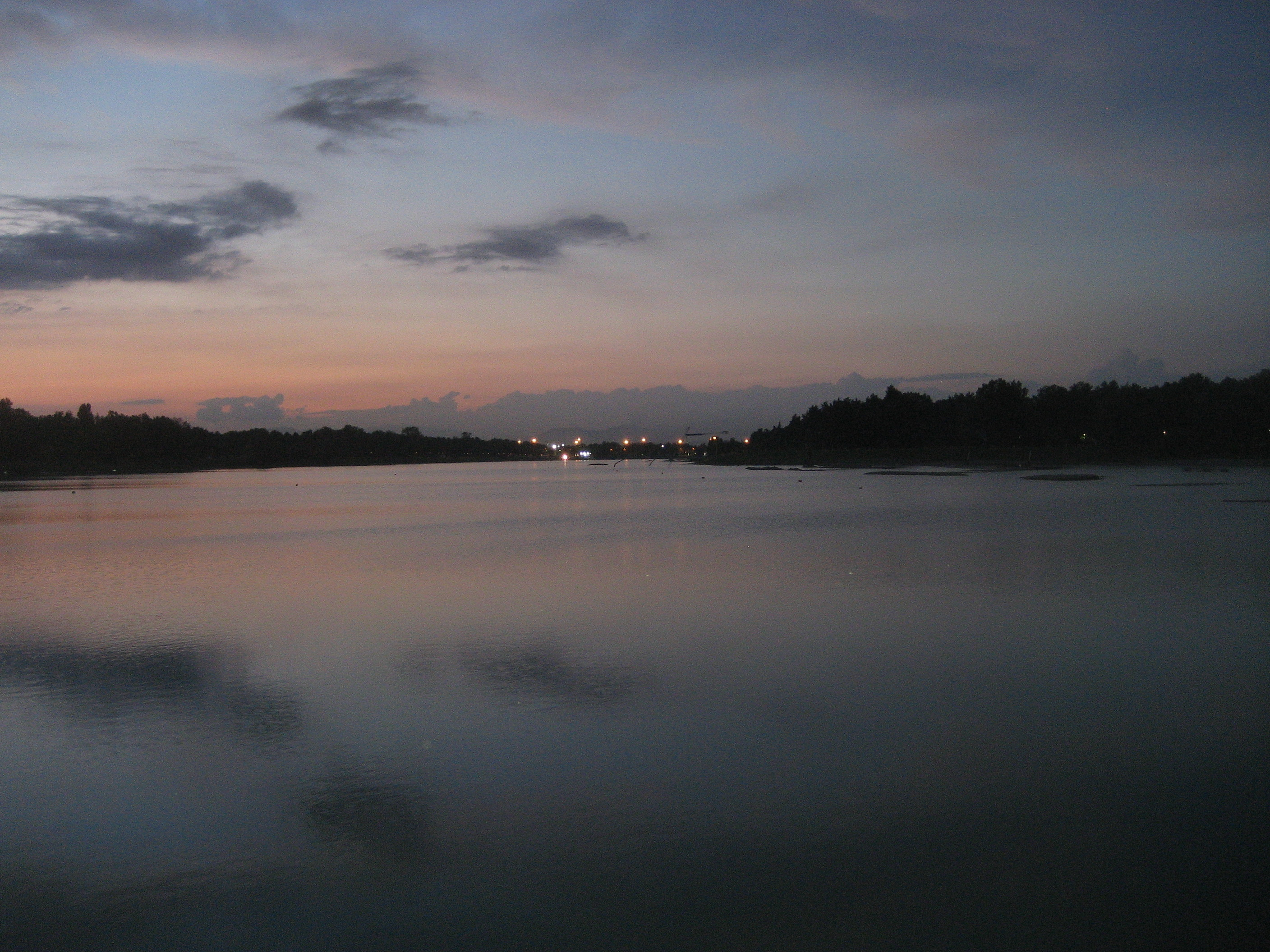
Idroscalo at sunset

Idroscalo is now owned by the Province of Milan which has transformed it into a park. The place hosts many recreational activities and is now sometimes known as the "Sea of Milan". The province manages the park and the social and sporting activities within it. Recent sponsorship by the Fila sportwear company allowed the park's facilities to be improved to allow water-skiing, free climbing, a mountain bike track and running paths. The park was renamed Idropark Fila for the period of the sponsorship.

Sports within the park include kayaking, canoeing, dragon boats, rowing, sailing, swimming, horse riding and water skiing. The park is used by the Idroscalo Club, Lega Navale Italiana, and CPPC sports clubs. The lake's first rowing races were in 1934. European Rowing Championships were held on the lake in 1938 and in 1950. Other major sporting events were the 1988 World Rowing Championships, the 1999 Canoe Sprint World Championships and the 2003 World Rowing Championships.

Moreover, the Idroscalo has bars and nightclubs which have been the venue for open-air concerts including the Italian metal festivals Gods of Metal, Evolution Festival and Papaya disco club.

Europark Idroscalo Milano is a nearby family-oriented amusement park, open from March to September and on weekends during the rest of the year. It was originally called Lunapark Milano and was constructed in 1965.

== See also ==
- Europark Idroscalo Milano
