= Segrate =

Segrate Segraa (Lombard)
- Comune
- Comune di Segrate
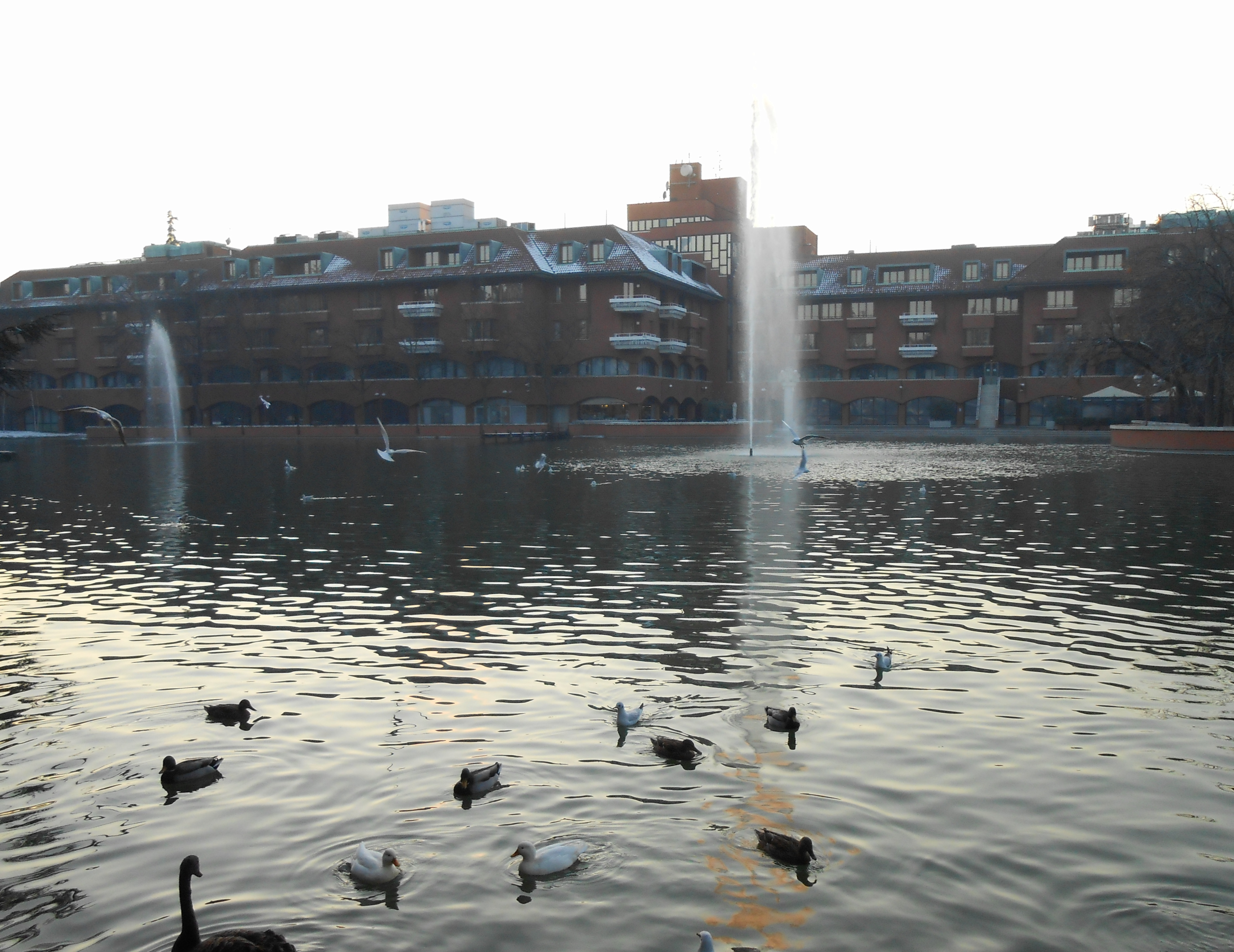

- Coat of arms

- Location within Italy Location within Lombardy
- Coordinates: 45°29′N 09°18′E
- Country: Italy
- Region: Lombardy
- Metropolitan city: Milan (MI)
- Frazioni: Lavanderie, Milano 2, Novegro, Redecesio, Rovagnasco, San Felice, Tregarezzo, Villaggio Ambrosiano

Government
  - Mayor: Paolo Micheli

Area
  - Total: 17 km^{2} (6.6 sq mi)
- Elevation: 115 m (377 ft)

Population (30 September 2015)
  - Total: 35,016
  - Density: 2,100/km^{2} (5,300/sq mi)
- Demonym: Segratesi
- Time zone: UTC+1 (CET)
  - Summer (DST): UTC+2 (CEST)
- Postal code: 20054
- Dialing code: 02
- Patron saint: St. Roch
- Saint day: 16 August
- Website: Official website

Segrate (Milanese: Segraa [seˈɡraː]) is a town and comune (municipality) located in the Metropolitan City of Milan in the Lombardy region of Northern Italy.

An eastern suburb of Milan, in its area lies the airport of Milan Linate, the lake Idroscalo, the fair center of Novegro and the famous residential area Milano Due. Europark Idroscalo Milano (originally Lunapark Milano) is a popular amusement park that has been in existence since 1965.

Although it is a small town, Segrate hosts large structures such as the CILEA Interuniversity Consortium, among the most advanced supercomputing centers in Europe, and the San Raffaele Hospital. Segrate received the honorary title of city with a presidential decree on 23 June 1989.

== Transportation ==
Segrate is served by Segrate railway station, connected to Milan by the suburban lines S5 and S6, with a total of four trains each hour. It is also connected to the city by the bus 924, which stops at Lambrate Rail and Metro Station.

== Notable people ==
Riccardo Bertozzi, (born February 1996) footballer

== See also ==
Mosque of Segrate

- Mosque of Segrate
