= Riccardo Bertozzi =

Italian footballer, goalkeeper

Personal information
- Date of birth: 12 February 1996 (age 30)
- Place of birth: Segrate, Italy
- Height: 1.84 m (6 ft 0 in)
- Position: Goalkeeper

Team information
- Current team: Fiorenzuola
- Number: 22

Youth career
- Parma
- 2013–2014: → Pro Piacenza (loan)

Senior career*
Years	Team	Apps	(Gls)
2015–2019	Pro Piacenza	8	(0)
2019	Arezzo	0	(0)
2019–2020	Piacenza	5	(0)
2020–2021	Caratese	2	(0)
2021–2022	Derthona	2	(0)
2022	Derthona	0	(0)
2022–2023	Correggese	21	(0)
2024–	Fiorenzuola	0	(0)
- * Club domestic league appearances and goals as of 3 October 2020

Riccardo Bertozzi (born 12 February 1996) is an Italian footballer who plays as a goalkeeper for Serie D club Fiorenzuola.

== Club career ==
Bertozzi played on youth level at Parma and Pro Piacenza. He made his professional debut in the latter club on 16 April 2016, in the 31st round of 2015–16 season of Lega Pro, against Renate, playing 90 minutes. He signed to Arezzo on 1 February 2019, weeks before the exclusion of Piacenza.

On 9 August 2019, he signed with Piacenza.

On 31 January 2024, Bertozzi joined Fiorenzuola.

== Sources ==
- Riccardo Bertozzi at TuttoCalciatori.net (in Italian)
