= Luna Park, Schenectady =

Coordinates: 42°51′12″N 73°53′39″W

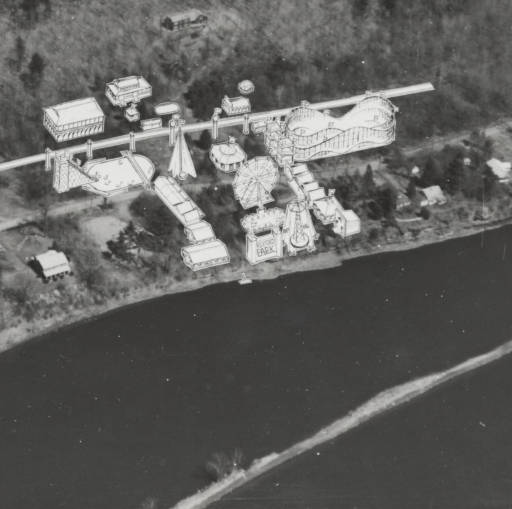
Aerial view of Rexford, NY showing the location of the Luna Park amusement park

Luna Park was one of several names for an amusement park that existed in Rexford, New York, near Schenectady, from 1901 to 1933. In addition to Luna Park (the name given by developer/entrepreneur Frederick Ingersoll when he added rides and assumed control of Rexford Park in 1906), it was also known as Dolle's Park (named after Fred Dolle, who bought the park from Ingersoll in 1912), Colonnade Park, Palisades Park, and (again) Rexford Park (in 1916) before the rides were dismantled in 1933. Constructed around the Grand View Hotel (built and opened by Jacob Rupert in 1901), the park was similar to Ingersoll's other Luna Parks in which it was a trolley park with roller coasters, picnic pavilions, carousels, a fun house, a roller rink, a concert shell, a dance hall, a midway, a Whip, and a shoot-the-chutes ride which presented itself at the park entrance adjacent to a station of the Van Vranken electric trolley line. Roughly seven decades before the Skycoaster rides that now dot various United States amusement parks, Luna/Rexford Park featured an aerial swing ride.

The trolley line charged its passengers five cents each for the trip to the park, but the park did not have an admission charge.

The Schenectady Luna Park lasted longer than most of Ingersoll's Luna Parks. Ingersoll's shaky finances (he was in bankruptcy court twice between 1908 and 1911) forced him to sell the popular park to Dolle in 1912. Four years (and three name changes) later, new management changed its name one last time, to Rexford Park. Unlike most amusement parks of the first decade of the 20th century, Luna/Rexford Park was still standing after the return of the U. S. military from participation in World War I. In 1925, the Grand View Hotel was destroyed by a fire, but the park stayed open for the season. The popularity of the park declined in the face of the onset of the Great Depression, forcing the dismantling of the park's rides in 1933.

Some of the pilings for the Saratoga trolley line still remain in the Mohawk River.
