= Luna Park, Johnstown =

Former amusement park in Johnstown, Pennsylvania

Luna Park, originally known as Roxbury Park, was an amusement park located in Johnstown, Pennsylvania. The park was commonly visited for its racetrack, picnic facilities, and amusement rides. It operated from 1904 to 1922, when it was converted to a municipal park.

== History ==
Johnstown founder Joseph Johns set aside land in his town for use as public parks in 1800. Part of that land was the land which would later house Roxbury Park, which, by 1904, was established as a fenced-off amusement area that contained a horse racing track. When the Tri-County Driving Park Association defaulted on $40,000 in bonds, ownership of the land fell into the hands of stockbroker Frank Cresswell, who then quadrupled the rent on the Roxbury Race Track in 1904. Track manager John Pender responded by moving all of the track's scheduled races to nearby Westmont Race Track, causing Roxbury Park to have a poor 1904 season.

After Cresswell attempted to persuade Pender to bring his races back to Roxbury Park, the park was subsequently leased to an association of roughly 100 businessmen and community leaders, including mayor Charles Young. The association invested an additional $50,000 for new attractions, including a merry-go-round, a roller coaster, a crystal maze, a laughing gallery, an "upside-down house", enhanced lakeside attractions (expanded lake and new boats), a vaudeville theater, and a grandstand that could seat 2,000 people. Just before the grand opening on Memorial Day 1905, the park's name was changed to Luna Park.

Luna Park's initial year, capped by hosting the 1905 Inter-State Fair (attended by 25,000 people) was successful, as was the second season. The Panic of 1907, a severe recession that started in 1907 and continued into 1908, had a devastating effect on the park's attendance figures in both years (including the cancellation of the 1908 Inter-State Fair), forcing the transfer of Luna Park's lease from its ownership under the association to a new partnership led by local brewer Ernest Emmerling in 1908. The races, picnics, and boxing matches that predated the park's grand opening continued to be Luna Park's main draw.

While its popularity never returned to the heights it attained in 1905, the Johnstown Luna Park managed to outlast most of its contemporary namesakes despite the uncertainty of its ownership. A new "New Luna Park Amusement Company" was incorporated on April 5, 1910. Capitalized at $10,000, the corporation was chartered for "buying, selling, or otherwise acquiring or disposing of real estate, for the purpose of erecting and operating thereon a scenic railway, dancing pavilion, and other amusements of a similar or cognate character, and generally to conduct the business of a recreation park."

In late 1914, the city of Johnstown was investigating the possibility of purchasing land for possible use as a municipal park. In 1917, the city stepped up its attempts to increase its parkland. After the 1918 purchase of nearby Highland Park, Johnstown mayor Joe Cauffiel urged the purchase of Luna Park. He reiterated his position in his second inauguration address in January of 1920.

In 1921, trolley service to the park ended. On July 18, 1922, the city of Johnstown purchased Luna Park, its land, and an additional tract in Upper Yoder Township with an appropriation of $366,618 ($210,469 going to the heirs of Cresswell, who still owned Luna Park's land). Subsequently, a vote of the Johnstown City Commission restored the Roxbury Park name to the still-open amusement park. Roxbury Park was converted into a municipal park after the end of the 1922 season. In the present day, no trace remains of the racetrack or the amusement park itself.
