= Luna Park, St. Petersburg =

Theme Park in Saint Petersburg

Luna Park was an amusement park in St. Petersburg, Russia that was open to the public from 1912 to 1924. Patterned after its London namesake (which itself was patterned after the Coney Island and Pittsburgh Luna Parks), it was Russia's first amusement park. After its permanent closure in 1924, Luna Park's grounds became the site of the stadium at Lesgaft National State University of Physical Education, Sport and Health.
