= Luna Park, Olcott Beach =

Amusement park in Olcott Beach, New York, U.S.

Luna Park (also commonly known as Luna Amusement Park) was an amusement park on the shore of Lake Ontario in Olcott Beach, New York, USA. A popular venue for live entertainment (with the Dreamland Dance Hall), it was open to the public from 1898 to 1926 (predating the Coney Island Luna Park by five years). The name of the dance hall and the inscription on the arch spanning the park's main entrance led to the commonly used nickname of "Dreamland."

In contrast to the similarly named parks that were opened throughout the United States from 1903 to 1914, the primary attractions presented by the Olcott Beach Luna Park were not large rides like the Shoot-the-Chutes and roller coasters but a section of Lake Ontario shore (a popular swimming attraction), restaurants and concessions (shared by the park and nearby Castle Inn), and live entertainment (at Dreamland Dance Hall). Smaller-scale mechanical rides were gradually added, including a circle swing ride. While the "lives" of most of the other Luna Parks were relatively brief (virtually all were gone by 1915), the Olcott Beach park maintained its prominence as a popular recreation stop and a major venue for live entertainment into the 1910s, as Olcott Beach remained a popular stop for both steamboats along the shore of Lake Ontario and interurban trains connecting Albany, Niagara Falls, and Buffalo.

At the end of World War I, Olcott Beach's prominence as a popular tourist destination faded quickly as the automobile replaced trains and steamboats as the city's primary method of access. As tourism dollars declined in the region, so did Luna Park and its main competitor, Rialto Park. While the crowds were dwindling in the 1920s, Luna Park managed to survive the 1926 season, its last in operation.

The following year, a massive fire destroyed virtually every building on Cooper Street (including the Castle Inn and the train station across the street) and most of Main Street. Luna Park was destroyed. The beachside hotels could not be saved and were eventually razed. So was nearby Rialto Park (opened 1902): it was demolished in 1928. Olcott Beach didn't have any operating amusement parks until 1940, when Olcott Amusement Park opened amidst a resurgence of the city (staying in operation until 1986). New Rialto Park opened at the site of its namesake in 1942 and stayed in operation for 50 years.

In 2003, Olcott Beach Carousel Park opened in the same location.
