= Luna Park, San Jose =

Neighborhood in San Jose, California, USA

Coordinates: 37.357°N 121.889°W

Luna Park is a neighborhood in San Jose, California. It is bounded by Old Oakland Road/13th Street, Berryessa Road/Highway 101 and North 17th Street.

It is named after the Luna Park amusement park built by Audley Ingersoll's of Ingersoll's Amusement and financed by the San Jose Street Car Company as a way of bringing more customers to the area. Luna Park was located on San Jose's Oakland Road, now named North 13th Street and contained an amusement park, baseball stadium and public park from the early 1907 until 1921.

It was later redeveloped into a city park and residential neighborhood that still bears the name Luna Park.

== Parks and plazas ==
There is a park named Luna Park within the neighborhood. Backesto Park is located nearby in the Northside neighborhood.
