= Shahr-e Bazi =

Former amusement park in Tehran, Iran

Coordinates: 35°47′18″N 51°23′36″E

Shahr-e Bazi (Persian: شهر بازی, lit. 'The City of Games', formerly known as Luna Park), was an amusement park located in the north of Tehran. Covering 150 acres (0.61 km^{2}), it was the largest amusement park in the Islamic Republic of Iran and admitted around 2.5 million visitors every year. It has been closed since 2007 due to highway construction, lack of inspection, and malfunctions.

The amusement park was opened in 1970 under the last Shah of Iran. It became a state-owned park after the Iran–Iraq War in 1988.
