= Luna Park Hamburg-Altona =

Amusement park in Hamburg, Germany

Coordinates: 53°33′57″N 9°56′33″E

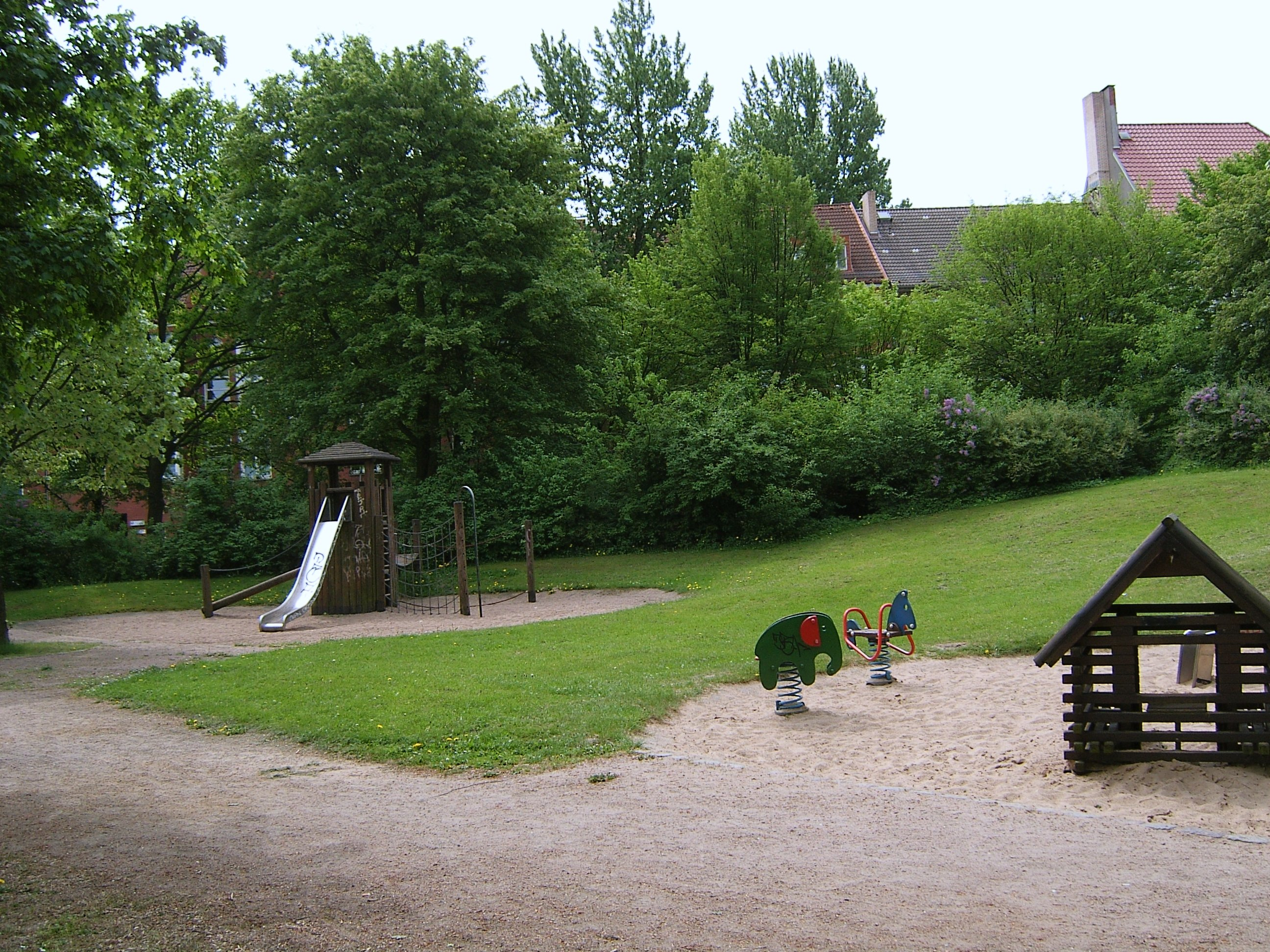
Playground on the site of Luna Park

Luna Park Hamburg-Altona (German: Lunapark Hamburg-Altona) was an amusement park in Altona, Hamburg, Germany. At its opening in 1913, it was the largest in Germany; it closed after the outbreak of the First World War in 1914 and reopened for less than a year in 1923.

== Park ==
Luna Park occupied more than 100,000 square metres (25 acres) between Augustenburger Straße, Kieler Straße, Memelandallee and Lunapark in the Altona district of Hamburg, which was an independent town at the time of its opening. It was adjacent to the Kaltenkirchen station and near the Emilienstraße and Holsten stations. At that time the largest amusement park in Germany, it was one of a number opened worldwide in the early 20th century which took their name from Luna Park in Coney Island.

The park included a 'scenic railway'—a roller coaster with mountain landscaping—a cycle-racing track, a swimming pool, a dance hall, and a 40,000-square-metre (430,000 sq ft) exhibition hall, in addition to gardens, a pool with fountain, and refreshment pavilions.

The buildings were half-timbered, constructed of concrete over staff with a coloured surface sprayed over the concrete. The entrance building was bright red with a tiled roof; the dance hall was modelled on a North German country house, with heavily decorated walls and a thatched roof; the other buildings had red Dutch tile roofs.

== History ==
The Lunapark-Gesellschaft, incorporated in November 1912 and headed by Hugo Smidt, took a 15-year lease from Altona on two adjacent land parcels, including a flood retention basin, the Diebsteich; the projected opening date was 1 May 1913. The original plan, by Ernst Schmidt & Liedtke, was Baroque in inspiration and highly symmetrical; after delays in construction and problems with building funds, the Altona town architect engaged the Danish architects Juul Brask and Elnar Rosenstand to simplify the park design and design the buildings.

The park opened on 28 August 1913. It closed a year later after the First World War broke out in August 1914; by 1921, most of the attractions had been dismantled.

In spring 1923 the park was reopened by the amusement park entrepreneur Hugo Haase, who moved attractions there from his park in Stellingen, which had closed in 1922. Inflation under the Weimar Republic and the resulting widespread poverty seriously affected business by that August, and Haase closed the park and had the buildings demolished. In the late 1920s the site was redeveloped, mostly for athletic grounds. A concrete unemployment office designed by Gustav Oelsner was built in 1926 on the site of the entrance building and is now a city landmark, and a block of flats on Memelandallee, also designed by Oelsner, is also on the former grounds. A street and a children's playground bearing the name Lunapark (located approximately on the site of the bandstand) are the only remaining indications of the park's existence.
