= Luna Park, Berlin =

Amusement park in Berlin, Germany

Luna Park
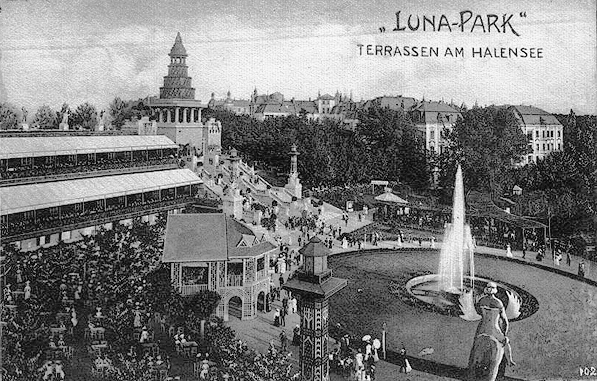
- The Terrasses at Luna Park, 1904
- Interactive map of Luna Park
- Location: Berlin
- Coordinates: 52.496°N 13.282°E
- Status: Defunct
- Opened: 1909
- Closed: 1933

Luna Park in the Halensee area of Berlin, Germany was an amusement park in operation from 1909 to 1933. At that time, it was Europe's largest. The park was closed for World War I but reopened after Armistice. Luna Park closed for the last time in October 1933.

== History ==
=== Origin ===
Around 1900 the businessman Saeger operated the Wirtshaus (guest house) am Halensee near the popular outdoor swimming pool on the east shore of Halensee Lake. At that time, the shopping district Kurfürstendamm was a forest path where on Sundays families took carriages from the nearby Grunewald train station (now Halensee) and drove in the Grunewald forest. Here rest breaks were made and there was a motto: "Families can make coffee here." On the grounds of the inn there was already a fairground with carousel, shooting dice and stalls, and a water slide, where a similar pontoon-like barge rolled down the mountain into the lake.

=== Opening and heyday ===
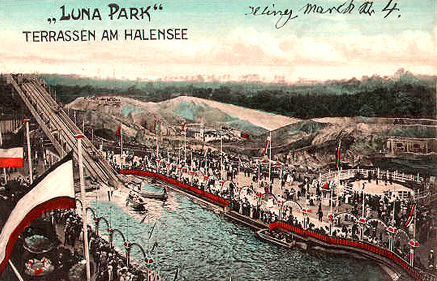
Luna Park Water Slide, 1904

On 14 May 1909 the gourmet August Aschinger together with the former chef at the Kempinski Hotel, Bernd Hoffmann, opened the terraces at Halensee, which were renamed that year Luna Park. It was a modern fairy-tale palace, with magnificent towers and a large staircase down to the lake.

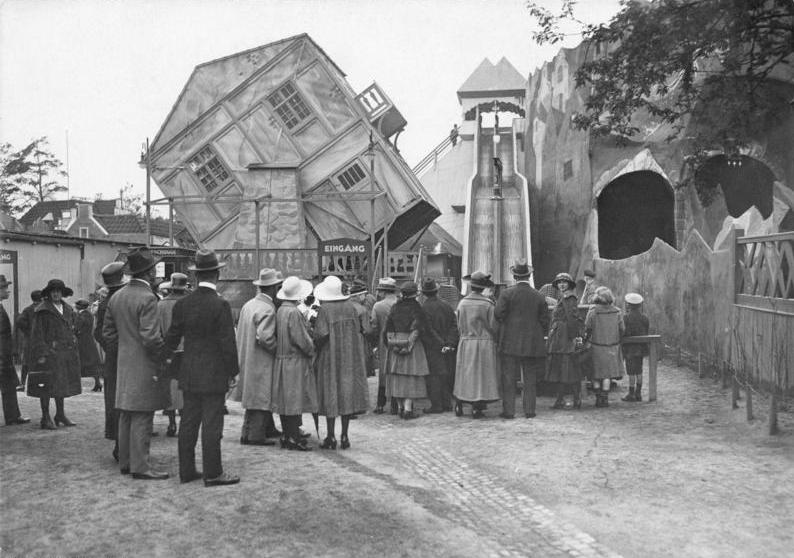
Swivel House (1923)

The park attractions included all the typical fairground attractions of the time, like a water slide that ended in the lake. It had as a special feature a water chute, which the Berliners called the "tart aquarium" because the ladies in the newest bathing attire presented themselves to the sitting gentlemen on the rim.

Other attractions were a loose staircase (Shimmy-Treppe) with a fan at the end that hoisted the skirts of the ladies, as well as a mountain train or a hippodrome. Following the example of Coney Island in Brooklyn, New York, an amusement park was established, offering sensations, adventures, and dangers, as well as the illusion of the big wide world and the experience of the seemingly limitless possibilities of technology.

Luna Park offered anthropological human shows ("Völkerschauen"); an early escalator; a large, nightly fireworks display; theater, revues, jazz, and cabaret; dance tournaments, and boxing matches. In 1926 the young Max Schmeling won his first title fight here. The restaurants had a capacity of 16,000 seats. There was a Bavarian-themed village where beer flowed in streams and the Luna Palace for more the lofty clientele. In its early years, the park counted 50,000 visitors a day and on weekends substantially more. As early as 1910, the millionth visitor was received.

=== Decline ===
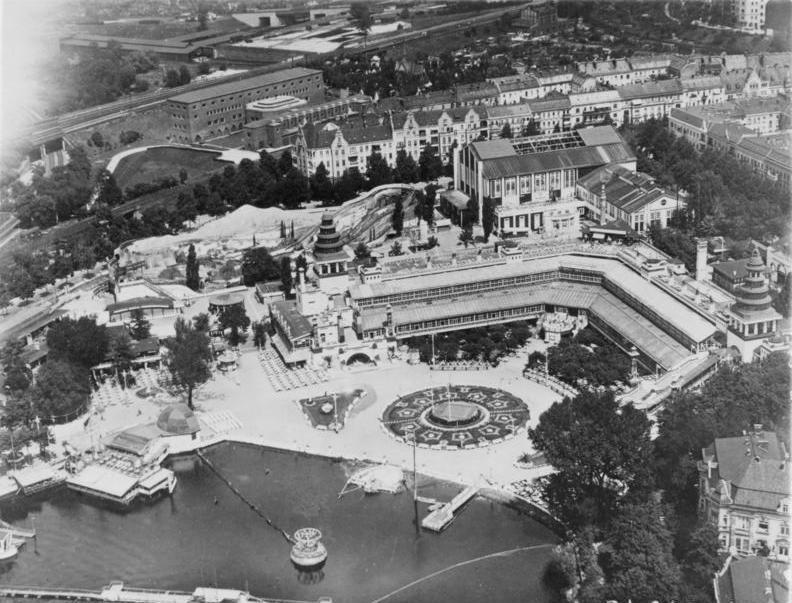
Berlin-Halensee, Lunapark, 1935, after the park had closed.

During the first World War and in the following period of hyperinflation in Weimar Germany, visitor numbers declined and the physical plant was in desolate condition. On May 9, 1929, the amusement park reopened after a major renovation. It succeeded; however, it did not attain its former grandeur.

=== Closure ===
In October 1933 the amusement park had to permanently close, and in 1934 the entire complex was demolished. The puppeteer Alfredo Bannenberg, being chased by Nazis, used the closed facility as a hideout for a short time.

The Nazis considered the park to be an eyesore. Soon it was found to be in the path of the required Halenseestraße, which was opened for the 1936 Summer Olympics to create a fast link between the Olympic Stadium, the Deutschlandhalle, the Berliner Funkturm, and southern venues.

== Gallery ==
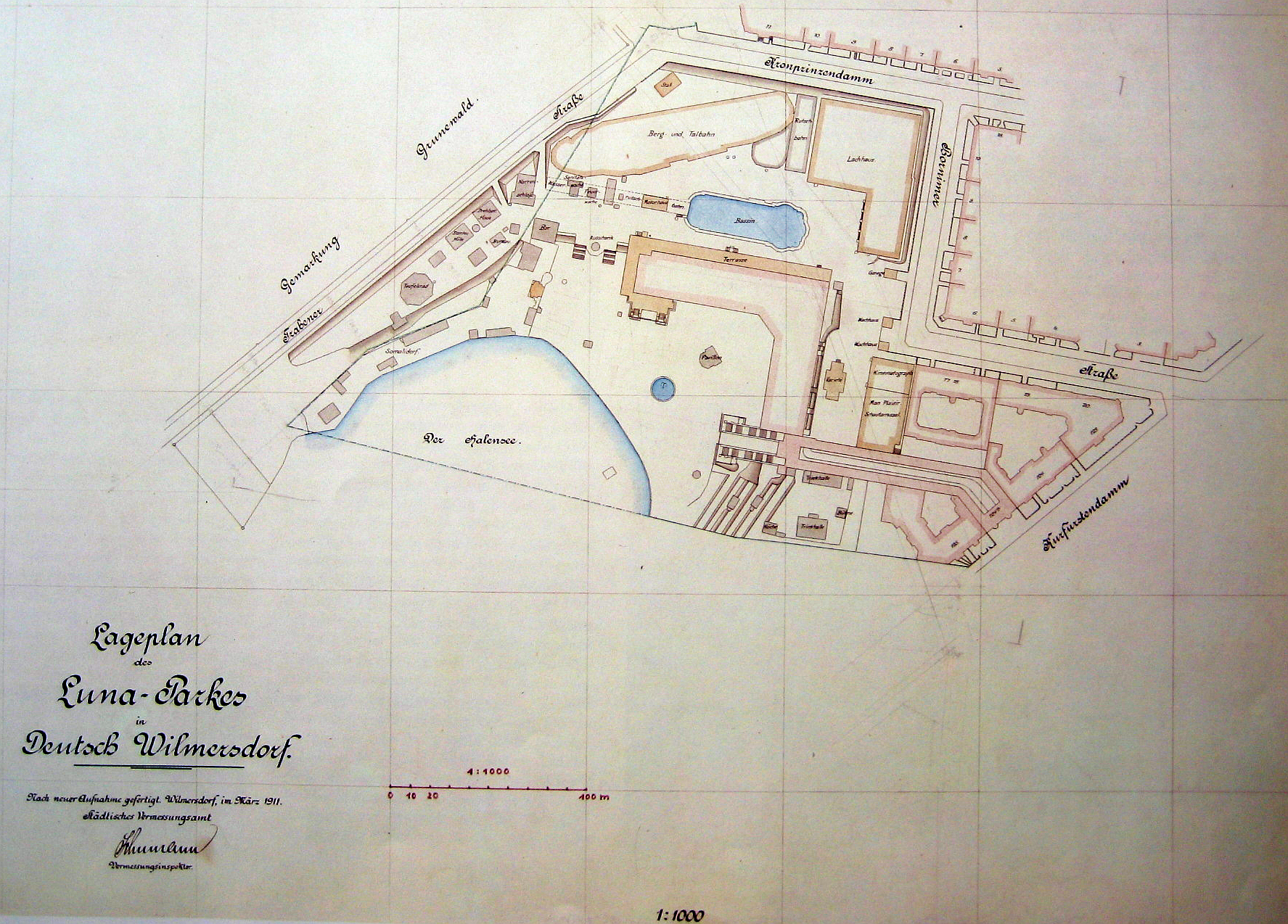
Lunapark plan 1911

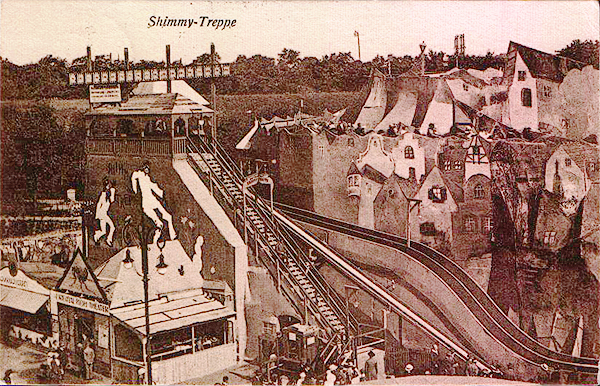
Lunapark, Shimmy-Treppe, 1904

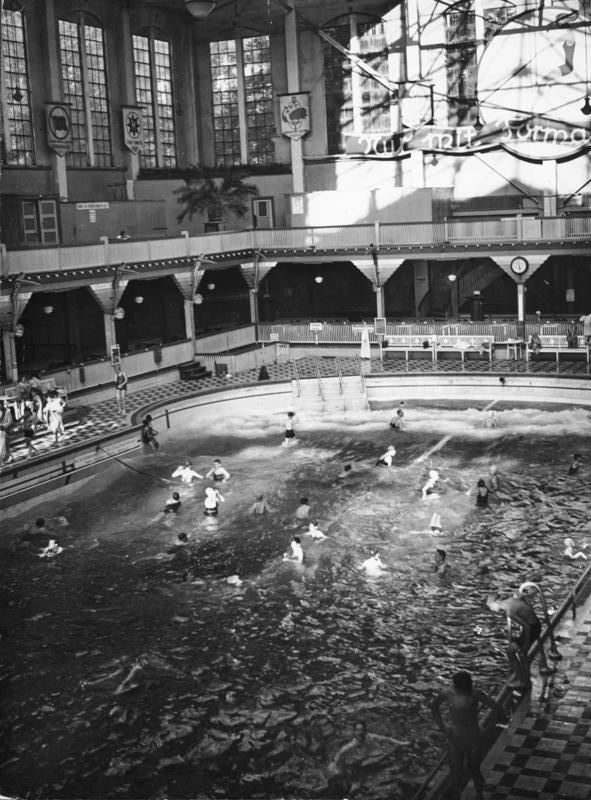

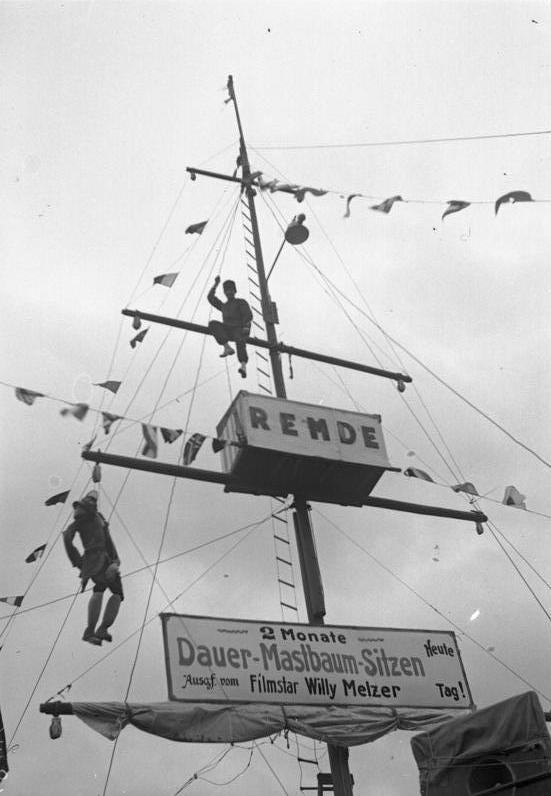
