= Luna Park, Cairo =

Trolley park in Egypt from 1911 to 1915

Coordinates: 30.092718°N 31.315358°E

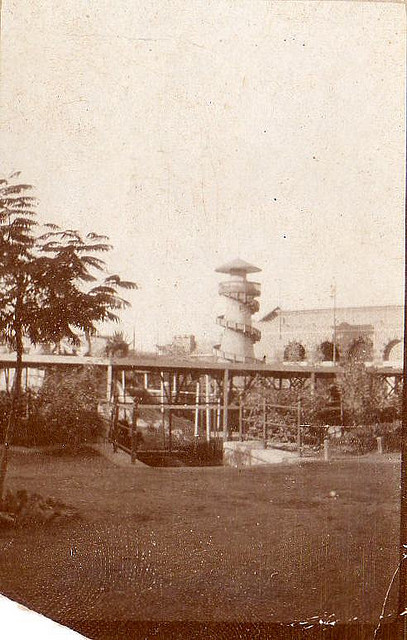
Luna Park, Cairo, 1915.

The Cairo Luna Park was a trolley park located in Heliopolis, Egypt. Open from 1911 until early 1915, it was the first Western-style amusement park in Africa and the Middle East. On 19 January 1915, the park's buildings and grounds were converted into an auxiliary hospital during World War I; the hospital closed on 10 July 1916.

== Amusement park ==
Heliopolis, planned as an "oasis" on the edge of Cairo, was developed in the early 20th century. Following a 1907 stock market crash, developers partnered with the Egyptian government to construct housing for government workers and added entertainment venues to attract residents. These included a hippodrome, polo and cricket fields, an aerodrome, a golf course, restaurants, and a new tram line from Cairo. Around 1910, the Luna Park amusement park was constructed—Africa and the Middle East's first of its kind. It opened to the public on 16 June 1911, featuring mechanical rides (including a switchback roller coaster), a midway, a roller skating rink, and restaurants.

== World War I auxiliary hospital ==
With the outbreak of World War I in late 1914, the Australian and New Zealand Army Corps (ANZAC) under General William Birdwood established No. 1 Australian General Hospital at the nearby Heliopolis Palace Hotel. Due to increasing demand, the ANZACs expanded the hospital to Luna Park, beginning with the ice skating rink. By 28 April 1915, over 500 beds were placed in the rink, and more makeshift wards were set up in the haunted house, scenic railroad, and pavilions. The box office was converted into an operating theatre. By mid-May 1915, Luna Park accommodated over 1,200 patients—many on beds made from bamboo and palm wood. More auxiliary branches were soon added. In August 1915, the patient count reached 1,400. The auxiliary hospital closed on 10 July 1916 when the main hospital moved to France.

Note: This facility should not be confused with the official No. 1 Australian Auxiliary Hospital, which opened at Harefield, England, in March 1915.

== Aftermath ==
Roxy Square now occupies the former site of Luna Park. While some buildings around the park remain, no trace of the original attraction survives. It is believed that Luna Park was demolished between 1929 and 1933.
