= Luna Park, Seattle =

Amusement park in Seattle, Washington, U.S.

Luna Park
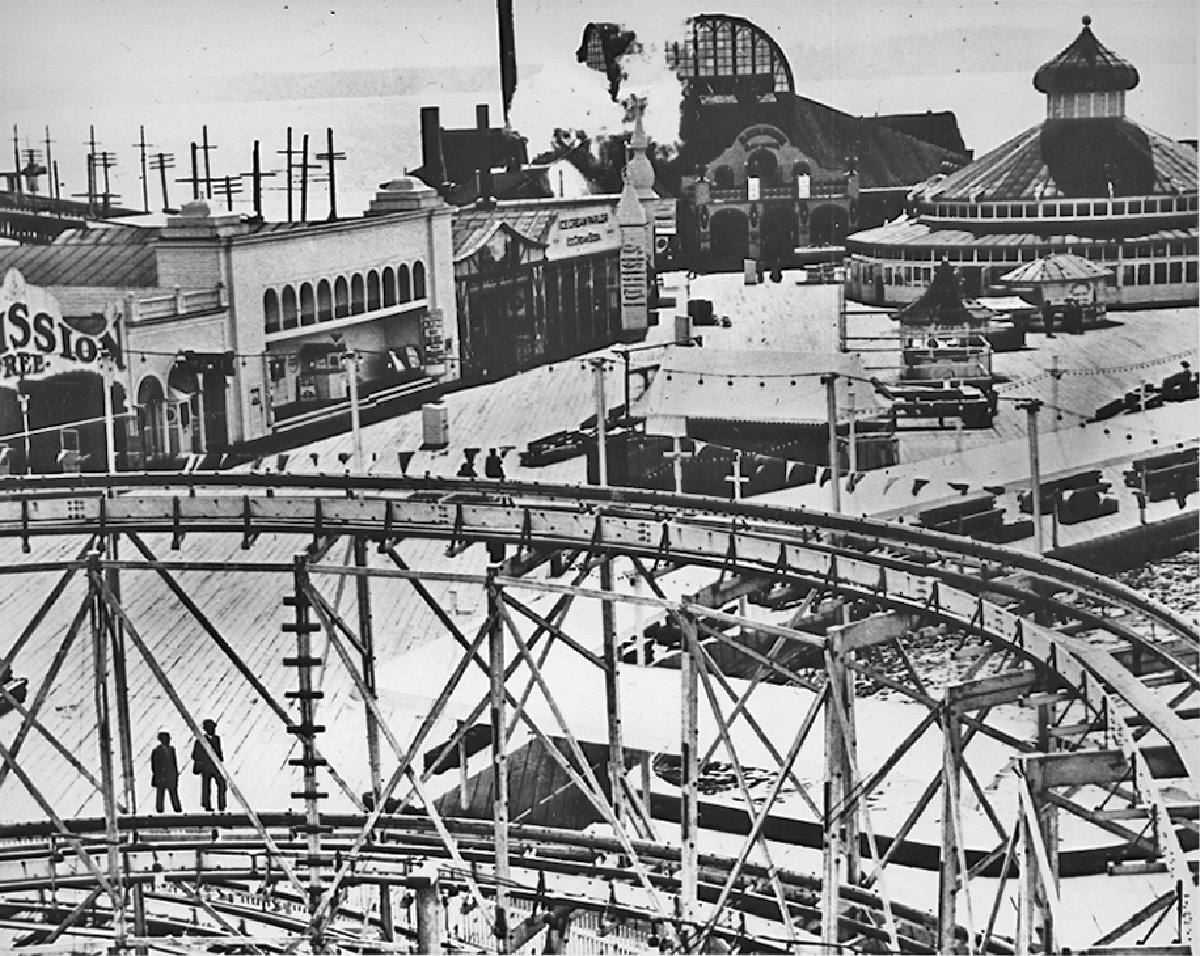
- Luna Park 1910. In the foreground is part of the Great Figure Eight roller coaster. At right rear is the carousel, and to its left the natatorium.
- Interactive map of Luna Park
- Location: Seattle, Washington
- Coordinates: 47.595324°N 122.387551°W
- Opened: 1907
- Closed: 1913

Luna Park was an amusement park in Seattle, Washington that operated from 1907 until 1913. Designed by famed carousel carver Charles I. D. Looff, who carved and installed Coney Island's very first carousel, Luna Park took its name from Coney Island's Luna Park. On July 4, 1908, Luna Park became the site of Seattle's first manned flight.

== History ==
=== Construction, opening ===
The 12-acre (4.9 ha) park was constructed near the Duwamish Head on the northern tip of Alki Point in West Seattle. Construction started in 1906, headed by Charles I. D. Looff. Built on pilings, the expansive boardwalk extended over Elliott Bay and was called the "Greatest Amusement Park on the West Coast".

Luna Park was accessible via the West Seattle ferry and the Seattle Municipal Railway's Luna Park Line. During the evening, the park was brightly illuminated, with buildings and rides outlined by light bulbs. Its extensive lighting display made the park visible from several miles away and contributed to its promotion as a nighttime destination for women and children.

=== Main attractions ===
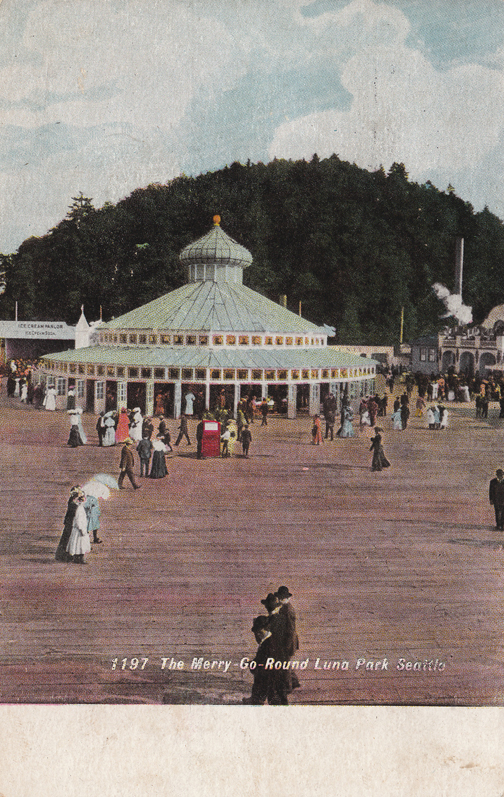
Charles I. D. Looff's hand-carved carousel

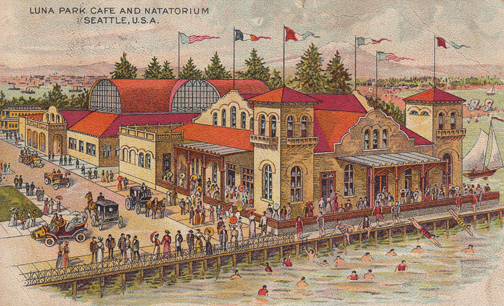
Luna Park, showing visitors swimming off the pier

Luna Park's main attractions were Charles I. D. Looff's hand-carved carousel, the Great Figure Eight Roller Coaster, the Giant Whirl, Shoot the Chutes, the Canals of Venice, and the Cave of Mystery. The carousel was originally intended for an amusement park in San Francisco, but the earthquake of 1906 disrupted the city's plans and the carousel was installed in Seattle instead. The carousel is currently located at Yerba Buena Gardens in San Francisco. With vaudeville enjoying immense popularity at the time, Luna Park also housed two theaters, the Dreamland Theater and the Trocadero, with the latter performing a new play each week.

Additionally, Luna Park hosted daily acts, including the clown Uncle Hiram, Don Carlo's Trained Monkey and Dog Circus, and the Original Human Ostrich. The park featured a live bear pit, as well as several transitory exhibits, such as Baby Incubators. The park was also host to a variety of concessions and games of chance, such as shooting galleries and ball tosses. One of the park's most prominent structures was its Natatorium, which housed heated saltwater and freshwater swimming pools.

On July 4, 1908, Luna Park became the site of Seattle's first manned flight. L. Guy Mecklem launched his airship from the park, racing two automobiles a distance of ten miles to the Meadows Racetrack in Georgetown. A much-heralded event, Mecklem beat the automobiles with two minutes to spare. Mecklem housed his aircraft at Luna Park for a short time afterward, charging visitors ten cents each to view it.

=== Annexation ===
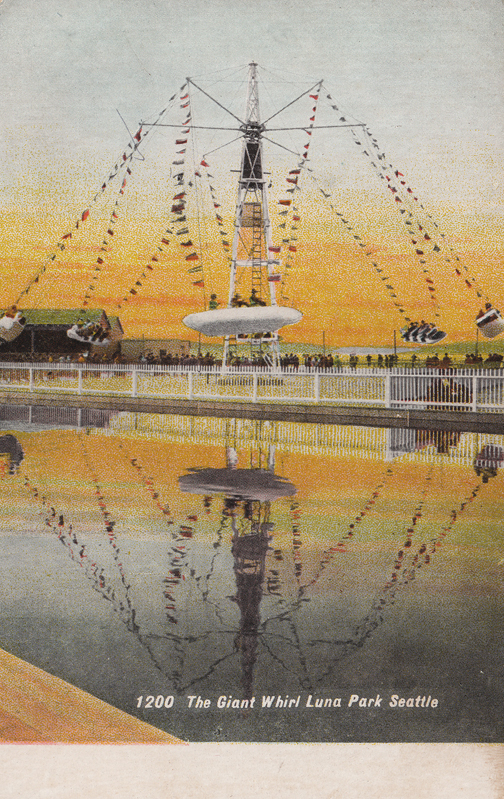
The Great Whirl at Luna Park

Other of Luna Park's nighttime attractions weren't as popular among the moral community of West Seattle. The park boasted the longest and best-stocked bar on Elliott Bay, a venue that angered the citizens around Alki. Feeling that drunks would overrun their community, West Seattle petitioned to be annexed into the City of Seattle in the hope that its conservative mayor, William Hickman Moore, would address this and other concerns.

Seattle annexed West Seattle in 1907, two days after Luna Park opened, but it did little good. The same year the City of Seattle also annexed Ballard, Southeast Seattle, South Park, Ravenna and Columbia City. With such massive expansion, Mayor Moore had little time to focus on the concerns over Luna Park. West Seattle citizens next attempted to put a referendum on the ballot to close the park entirely. A petition was circulated but invalidated shortly after when a number of its signers asked for their signatures to be removed.

In the next mayoral election, Hiram Gill replaced Moore as mayor. Gill, who favored an open-town policy, was not the mayor for which West Seattle was hoping. Gill's chief of police, Charles Wappenstein, was tasked with controlling the restricted district. Instead he took payoffs from those dealing in booze, gambling and women and the district expanded. Wappenstein was also involved with the development of a 500-room brothel in Beacon Hill, a project in which Luna Park's manager, W.W. Powers, was an investor. The Forces of Decency, an activist group consisting of prohibitionists and newly enfranchised female voters, pushed for a recall election and Hi Gill was voted out of office. The park and its bar continued to operate for another two seasons, so its affiliation with vice had little impact on Luna Park.

=== Difficulties ===
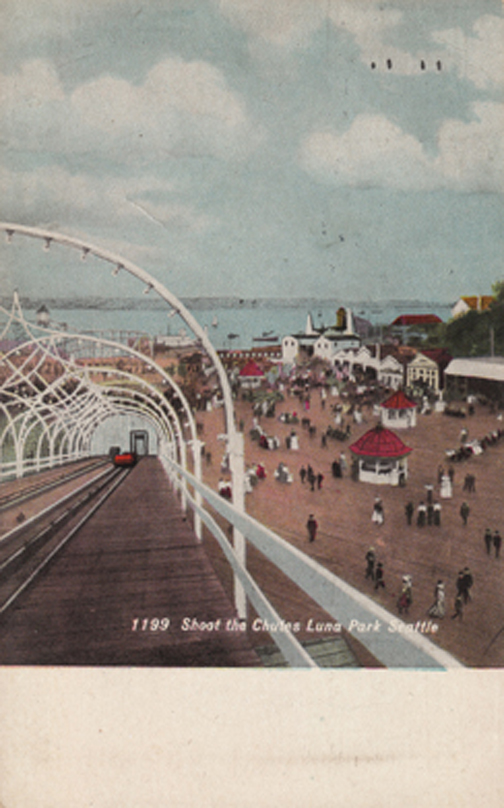
Pictured is the Shoot the Chute ride; there were a number of injuries sustained on the park's attractions

Numerous visitors sustained injuries at the park. One patron slipped from the top of one of the rides and snapped his neck. Another patron injured his knee playing the high striker and filed a successful suit against Luna Park. There were also disputes between the park's managing companies, however, that led to the filing of lawsuits. Charles I. D. Looff, who operated the park's amusements, sold his share of the company out of frustration and returned to his operations in California.

Luna Park set the stage for a grand reopening for its 1913 season. "New Luna Park to Equal Eastern Amusement Resorts," read the headline in the Seattle Post-Intelligencer. The park was to be "new in every element of its ownership and conduct," right down to its manager, W. H. Labb, who had built White City in Chicago. The park was to feature enlarged attractions, including "racing coasters" that would replace the Great Figure Eight roller coaster. The management was even offering stock in the park at $1,000 per share, which they promised would yield 25% dividends. However, Luna Park was closed that same year.

=== Closing, legacy ===
The rides were disassembled and removed in 1913, with the Zeum Carousel traveling to California (the carousel is now in operation at Yerba Buena Gardens in San Francisco, California). The Natatorium continued to operate, however, changing its name to Luna Pool. In 1931, Luna Pool caught fire and the remains of Luna Park were destroyed in the blaze. The fire was suspicious, with many believing that the culprit was the same arsonist, Robert Driscoll, who had destroyed a number of other Seattle landmarks. The pier was declared a total loss and replacement estimates were too high for the city to finance rebuilding. It was condemned in 1933.

In 1946, the City of Seattle filled in the pools of the Natatorium to avoid potential lawsuits. Today the site is known as Anchor Park due to the sizeable anchor, salvaged from the waters near this location, that is on display. The park also features observational viewers that project phantom images of Luna Park over Elliott Bay, offering visitors a glimpse into the past. Today all that remains of the Greatest Amusement Park on the West Coast are the original pilings, which are visible during extremely low tide. The name also survives in such local businesses as the Luna Park Cafe.

In August 2011, a pictorial history titled "Seattle's Luna Park" was released by Arcadia Publishing.

== Gallery ==
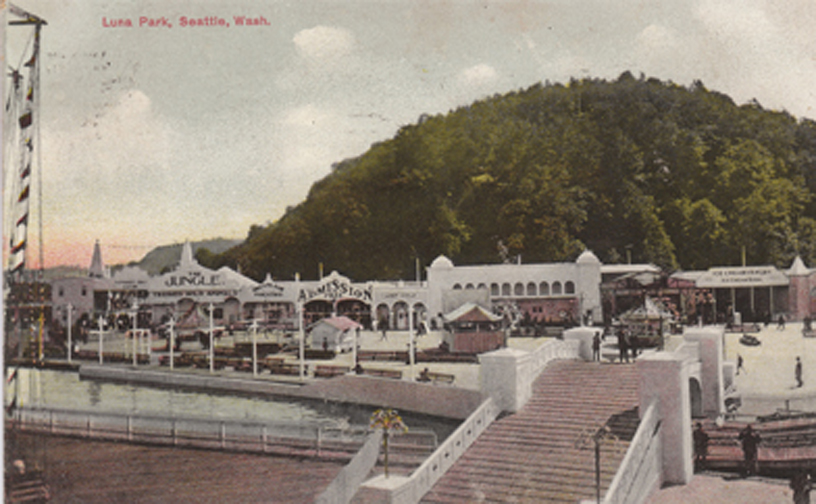
The entrance bridge

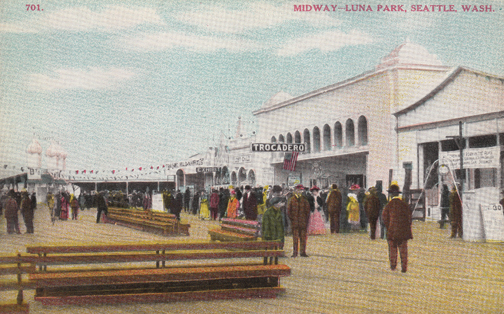

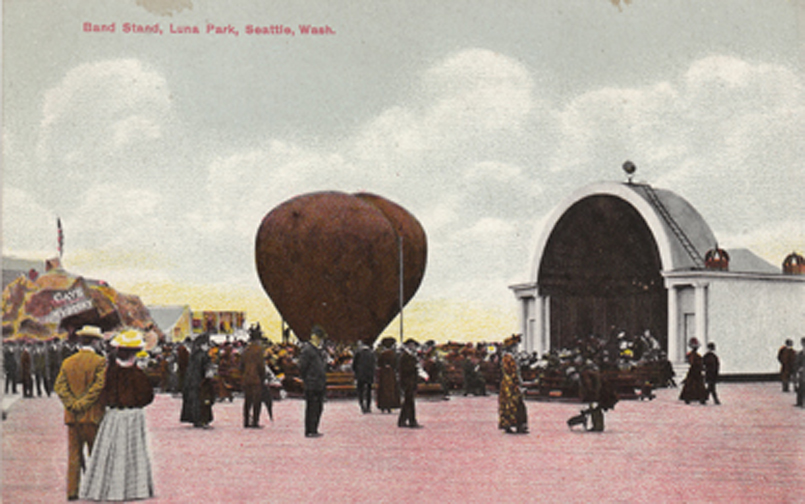
The band stand

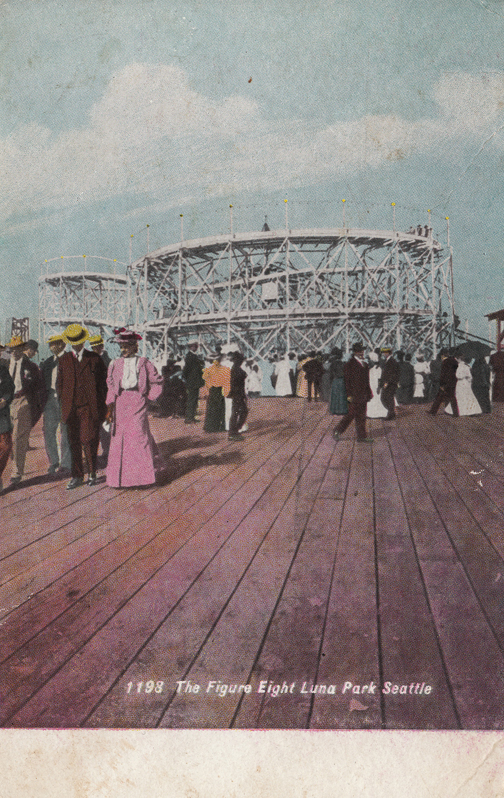
The Figure Eight roller coaster
