= Electric Park, Detroit =

Former amusement park in Detroit, Michigan

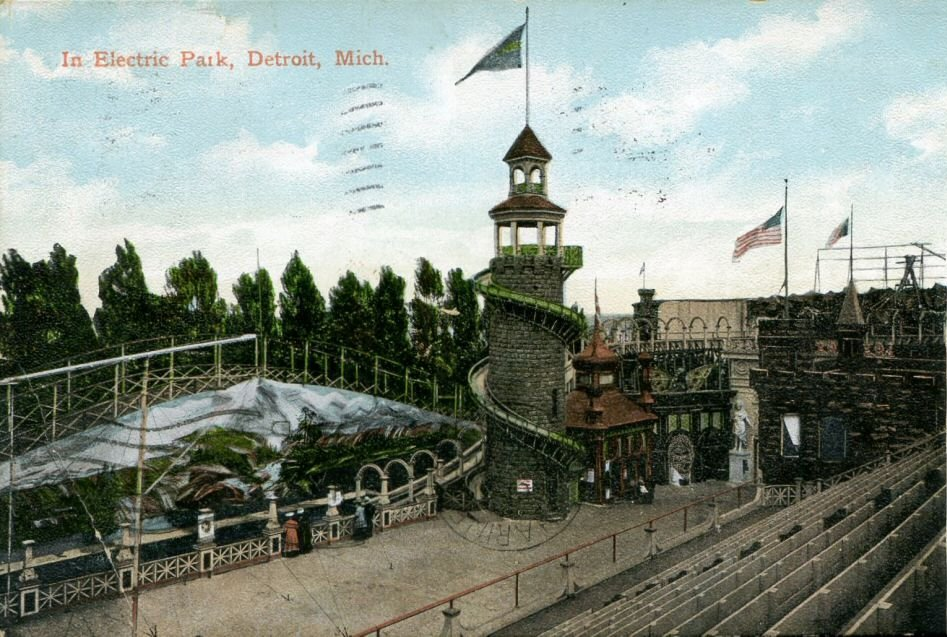
Electric Park, Detroit

Electric Park was an amusement park in Detroit, Michigan that was in operation from 1906 to 1928. Owned by Arthur Gaulker and his family, the park was also known by Riverview Park, Luna Park, and Granada Park in its 22-year existence, with several unofficial nicknames like "Pike's Peak", "Riverside", and "Granada". The park was sited on East Jefferson Drive adjacent to the approach to the bridge to Belle Isle.

== Trolley park ==
Electric Park was originally a trolley park at the end of three streetcar lines (the Myrtle, Fort-East, and the Crosstown); public transportation to Electric Park to nearby Belle Isle gradually shifted toward the use of buses, even after the completion of new streetcar tracks after the construction of a new MacArthur Bridge in the early 1920s (the new tracks were never used). The park's main entrance was dominated by a large windmill across the street from the entrance to the park's boardwalk, which had a sign stating: "The Boardwalk: Just for Fun."

== Rides and attractions ==
Rides and attractions in the densely packed Electric Park include a roller coaster (one was called the Derby Racer; another featured a sign that said "Trip Thru the Clouds - Detroit's Greatest Ride"; others that appeared in the park were the Big Dipper, the Bobs, and the Dare Devil), Ferris wheel, an interactive simulation of the Johnstown Flood, a Shoot-the-Chutes around which the rest of the park is configured, a Whip ride, aerial swings, various other mechanical rides, live entertainment (including acrobats and aerialists) performing in front of a bank of bleacher seats that dominated one side of the park), a riverfront pier, a coliseum, picnic facilities, and the Palais de Danse ballroom built (in 1912) over the edge of the water of the Detroit River. Another dance hall, Palace Gardens, was destroyed in a May 1911 blaze; the Coliseum and the pier and boardwalk (site of the park's concession stands) burned down ten years later. Before the fire, the Pier Ballroom and the Ramona were popular places for dancing; afterwards, the nearby Merry Gardens Ballroom kept drawing crowds even after the demise of the park.

== Legal battles ==
The 1920s saw a series of legal battles challenging the ownership of the park and challenging the existence of the park. In 1927, the legal contests came to an end as the City of Detroit condemned many of the park's structures as a blight (contemporary accounts called the buildings "eyesores"), and Electric Park closed permanently. The following year, the buildings were leveled to create a new public park, which eventually became Gabriel Richard Park.
