= List of defunct amusement parks in the United States =

According to the National Amusement Park Historical Association, there are approximately 1,000 defunct amusement parks in North America, with a significant number being in the United States. The primary reasons for amusement park closures in the early-20th century included the advent of the Great Depression, destruction by fire, incidents, and construction of highways and other forms of land development.

== List of parks ==
=== Alabama ===
Amusement park	City	Years of operation	Notes	Ref.
Canyon Land Park	Fort Payne	1970–1973		
Lake City Amusement Park	Guntersville	2016	Operated for two months.	
Southern Adventures	Huntsville	1998–2018		
Space City USA	Huntsville	1964	Abandoned prior to completion	
Styx River Water World	Loxley	1945–2020		

=== Arizona ===
Amusement park	City	Years of operation	Notes	Ref.
Breakers Water Park	Marana	1982–2018		
Legend City	Phoenix	1963–1983		
Big Surf	Phoenix	1969–2019		

=== Arkansas ===
Amusement park	City	Years of operation	Notes	Ref.
Dinosaur World	Beaver	1967–2005		
Dogpatch USA	Marble Falls	1968–1993		
Wild River Country	North Little Rock	1985–2020		
Willow Springs Water Park	Little Rock	1928–2013		

=== California ===
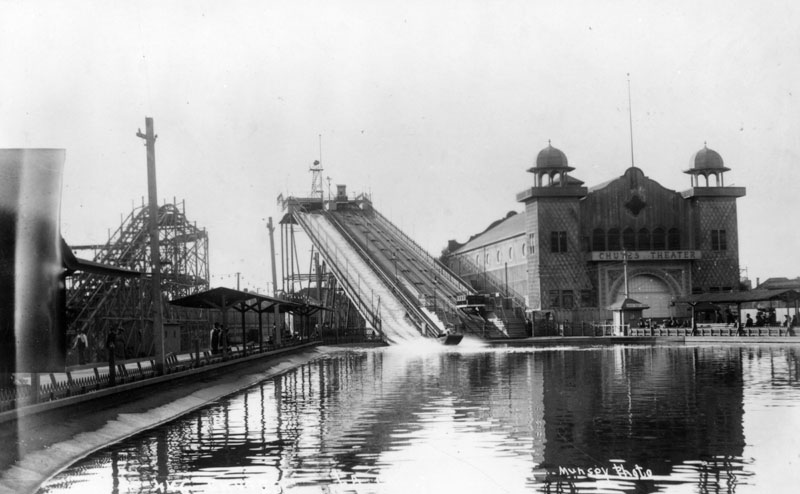
Chutes Park, Los Angeles c. 1906

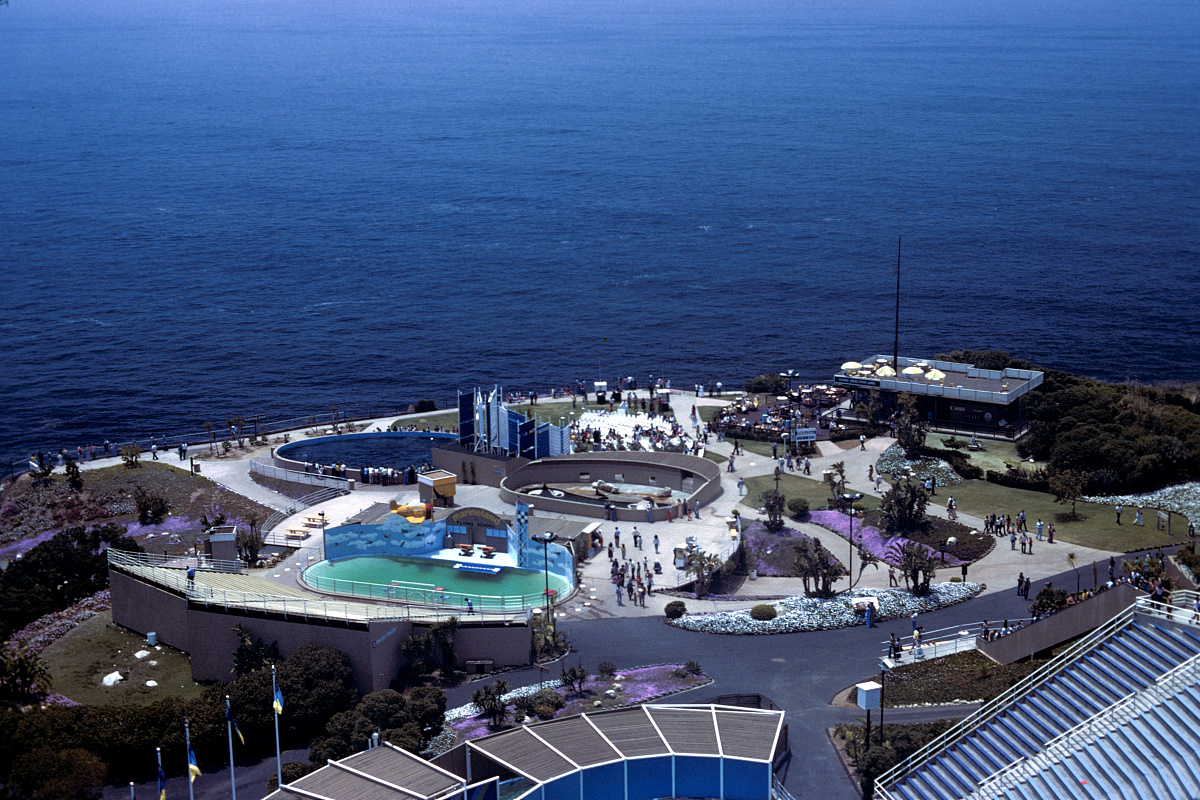
Marineland of the Pacific, 1977

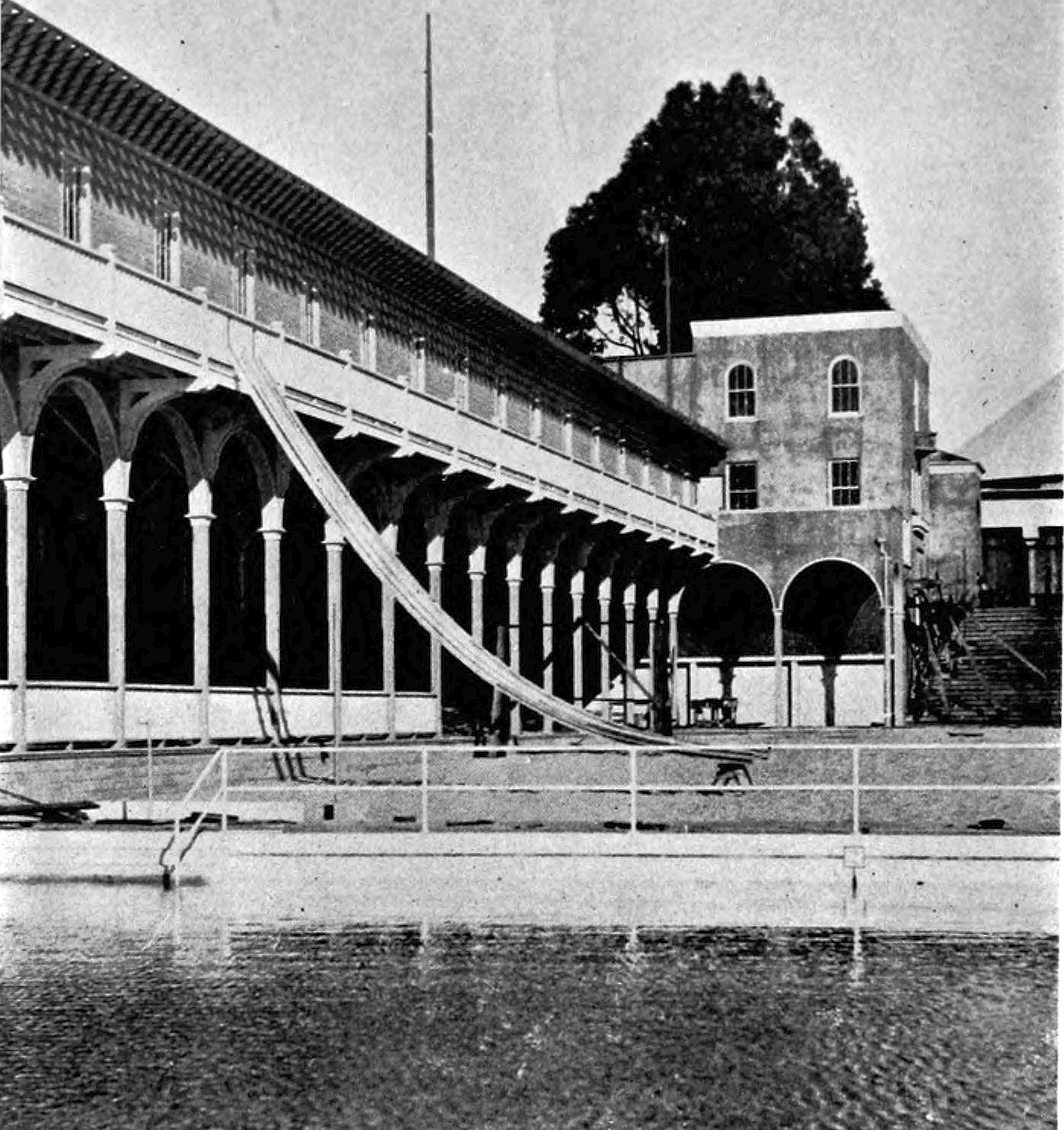
Pavilion at Neptune Beach, 1917

Amusement park	City	Years of operation	Notes	Ref.
Alum Rock	San Jose	1943–1962		
Beverly Park	Los Angeles	1943–1974		
Boomers!	Fresno	1997–2017		
Busch Gardens	Van Nuys	1954–1979		
Chutes Park	Los Angeles	1887–1914		
Corriganville Movie Ranch	Simi Valley	1937–1979		
Fun Town at Garden Grove	Lodi	1950s–2019		
Frontier Village	San Jose	1961–1980		
Frontierland Amusement Park	Pacifica	1960–1962		
Idora Park	Oakland	1904–1929		
Japanese Village and Deer Park	Buena Park	1967–1975		
J's Amusement Park	Guerneville	1960s–2003		
Jungleland USA	Thousand Oaks	1926–1969		
Lion Country Safari	Irvine	1970–1984		
Luna Park	Los Angeles	1910–1914	Formerly Chutes Park	
Luna Park	San Jose	1910–1916		
Marine World/Africa U.S.A.	Redwood City	1968–1986		
Marineland of the Pacific	Rancho Palos Verdes	1954–1987		
Marshal Scotty's Playland Park	El Cajon	1967–1998		
Neptune Beach	Alameda	1917–1939		
Neverland Valley Ranch	Santa Barbara County	1988–2006		
Ocean Park Pier	Santa Monica	1926–1956		
Pacific City	Coyote Point Park, San Mateo	1922–1923		
Pacific Ocean Park	Santa Monica	1958–1967		
Pierpoint Landing	Long Beach	1948–1972		
The Pike	Long Beach	1902–1979		
Playland	Fresno	1955–2025		
Playland at the Beach	San Francisco	1913–1972		
Rock-A-Hoola Waterpark	Newberry Springs	1962–2004	Formerly Lake Dolores Waterpark	
Joy Land	Sacramento	1920-1927		
Santa's Village	Lake Arrowhead	1955–1998	Now reopened as SkyPark at Santa's Village	
Santa's Village	Scotts Valley	1957–1979		
Scandia Amusement Park	Ontario	1992–2019		
Tahoe Amusement Park	South Lake Tahoe	1958–2008		
Venice Amusement Pier	Venice, Los Angeles	1921–1946		
Wild Rivers	Irvine	1986–2011	Reopened in 2022.	
Wild, Wild Wet!	Anaheim	1978–1982		
Wonderland Amusement Park	San Diego	1913–1916		

=== Colorado ===
Amusement park	City	Years of operation	Notes	Ref.
Buckskin Joe	Buckskin Joe	1957–2010		
Guyton's Fun Junction	Grand Junction	1954–1999		
Heritage Square	Golden	1959–2018		
Luna Park	Manhattan Beach, Denver	1908–1914		
Magic Mountain	Golden	1957–1960		
Manhattan Beach	Edgewater	1890–1908	First amusement park west of the Mississippi River; rebuilt as Luna Park	

=== Connecticut ===
Amusement park	City	Years of operation	Notes	Ref.
Babb's Beach	Suffield	1898–1955	The facilities were destroyed by Hurricane Diane	
Holy Land USA	Waterbury	1955–1984	Reopened on September 14, 2014	
Pleasure Beach	Bridgeport	1892–1958		
Savin Rock Amusement Park	West Haven	1870s–1966		

=== Delaware ===
Amusement park	City	Years of operation	Notes	Ref.
Blue Diamond Park	New Castle	2002–2014		
Brandywine Springs	Newport	Early 1900's–1923		
Shellpot Park	Brandywine Hundred	1893–1934		

=== District of Columbia ===
Amusement park	City	Years of operation	Notes	Ref.
Suburban Gardens	Washington	1921–1940		

=== Florida ===
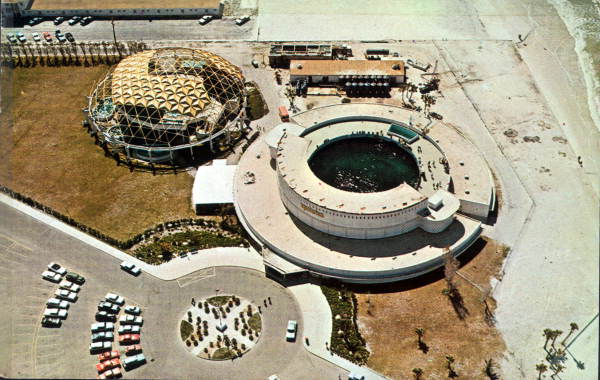
Aquatariam, c. 1965

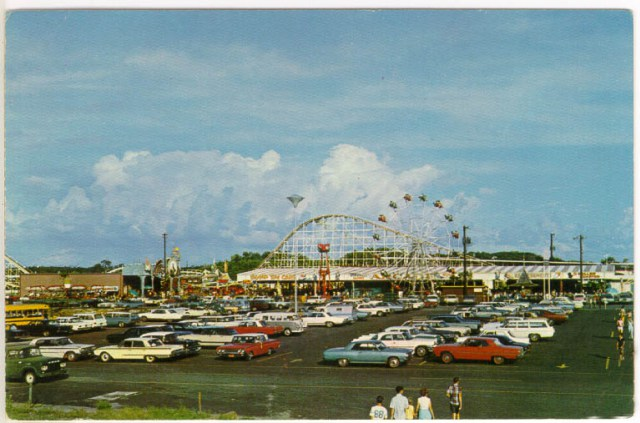
Miracle Strip Amusement Park

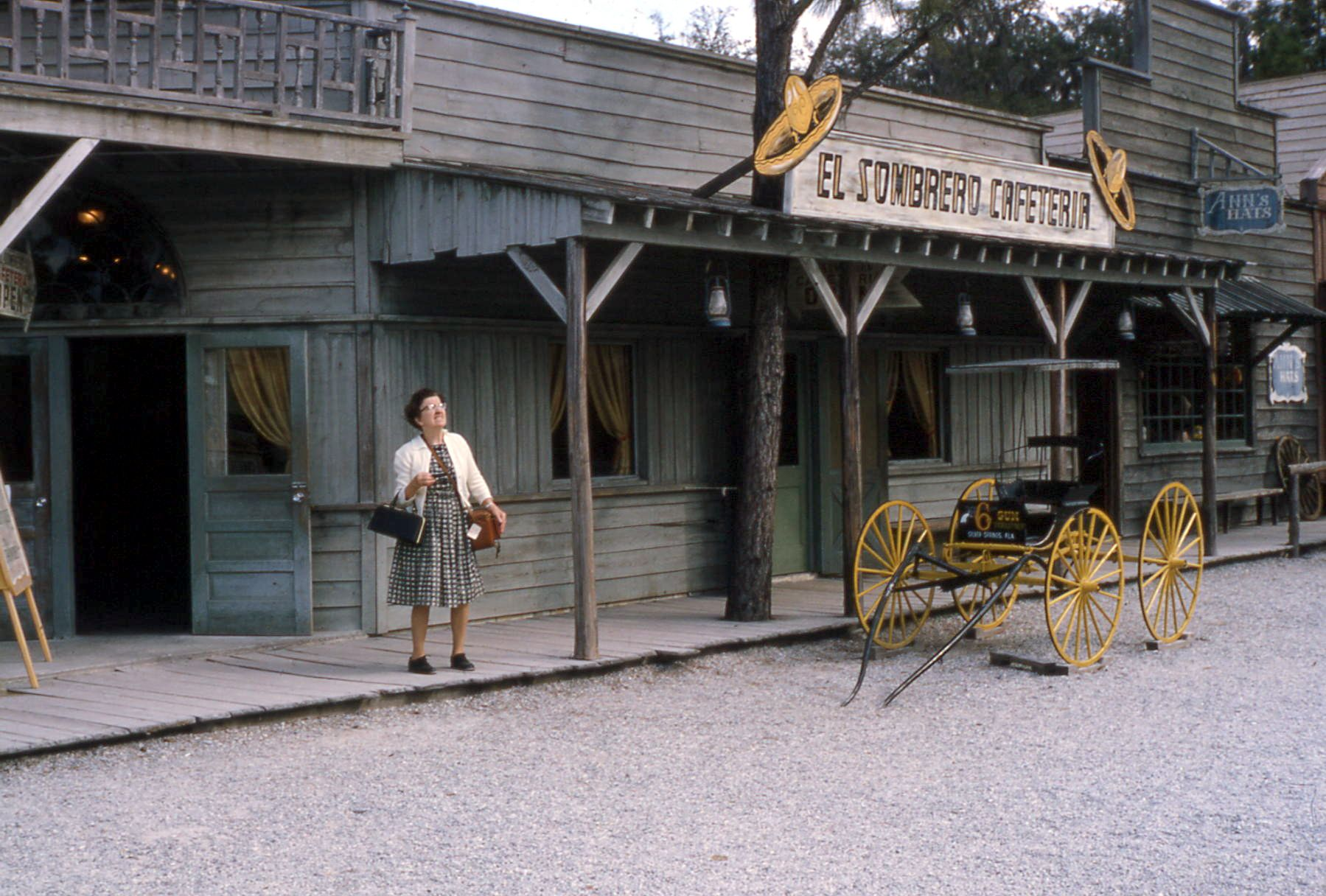
Six Gun Territory, c. 1967

Amusement park	City	Years of operation	Notes	Ref.
Adventure Landing "Shipwreck Island"	Jacksonville Beach	1995–2025		
Africa U.S.A. Park	Boca Raton	1953–1961		
Aquafair	North Miami	1956–1961		
Aquatarium	St. Pete Beach	1964–1977	Later known as Shark World	
Boardwalk and Baseball	Haines City	1987–1990		
Boomers!	Dania Beach	2000s–2015		
Castle Park	Fort Lauderdale	1976–1986		
Circus World	Haines City	1974–1986		
Cypress Gardens	Winter Haven	1936–2009	Absorbed by Legoland Florida	
Dinosaur Adventure Land	Pensacola	2001–2008		
Disney's Discovery Island	Lake Buena Vista	1974–1999	Part of Walt Disney World	
Disney's River Country	Lake Buena Vista	1976–2001	Part of Walt Disney World	
Dog Land	Chiefland	1960–1970s		
Floridaland		1964–1971		
Grand Prix Race-O-Rama	Davie	1972–1986		
Holy Land Experience	Orlando	2001–2020		
Marco Polo Park	Bunnell	1970–1976		
Miami Serpentarium	Miami	1947–1984		
Miracle Strip Amusement Park	Panama City Beach	1963–2004		
Miracle Strip at Pier Park	Panama City Beach	2010–2015		
Mystery Fun House	Orlando	1976–2001		
Ocean World	Fort Lauderdale	1965–1994		
Ocean View Pavilion Amusement Park	Jacksonville Beach	1928–1964		
Paradise Park	Silver Springs	1949–1969	Closed when Silver Springs began admitting non-whites.	
Petticoat Junction Amusement Park	Panama City Beach	1963–1984		
Pioneer City	Davie	1966–1968		
Pirates World	Dania Beach	1967–1975		
Planet Ocean	Miami	1974–1991	Oceanography educational park	
Six Flags Atlantis	Hollywood	1983–1992		
Six Gun Territory	Silver Springs	1963–1984		
Splendid China	Four Corners	1993–2003		
Tiki Gardens	Indian Shores	1964–1980s		
Wannado City	Sunrise	2004–2011		
Water Mania	Kissimmee	1980s–2005		
Wet 'n Wild Orlando	Orlando	1977–2016		
Wild Waters	Ocala	1978–2016		
Wonderland	Titusville	1959–1973		

=== Georgia ===
Amusement park	City	Years of operation	Notes	Ref.
American Adventures	East Cobb	1990–2010		
Fun Spot America Atlanta	Fayetteville	1990–2026		
Ponce de Leon Amusement Park	Atlanta	1872–1920s		
The World of Sid and Marty Krofft	Atlanta	1976		

=== Idaho ===
Amusement park	City	Years of operation	Notes	Ref.
Wild Waters	Coeur d'Alene	1982–2010	Closed for "renovations" in 2009 and never reopened.	

=== Illinois ===
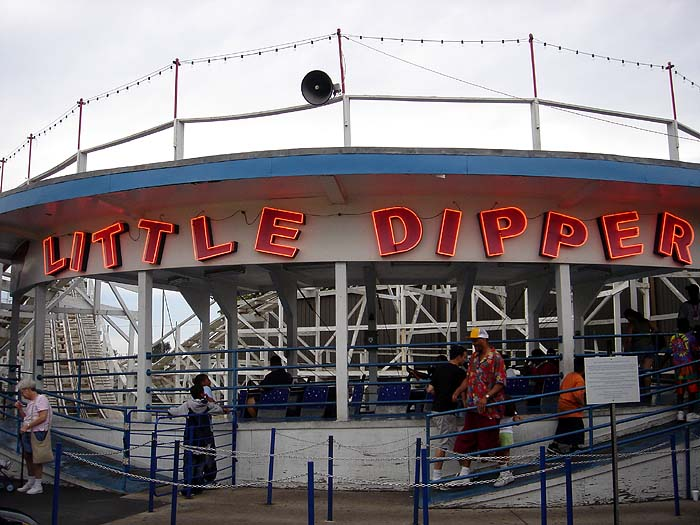
Little Dipper at Kiddieland Amusement Park, 2005

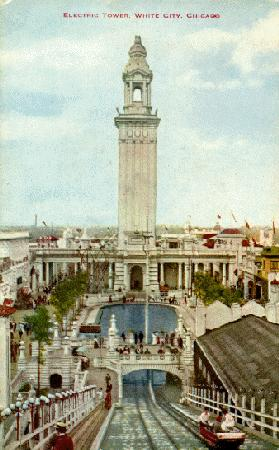
White City, Chicago, 1908

Amusement park	City	Years of operation	Notes	Ref.
Adventureland	Addison	1961–1977	Demolished in mid-1990s	
DisneyQuest Chicago	Chicago	1999–2001		
Dispensa's Kiddie Kingdom	Oakbrook Terrace	1975–1984		
Ebenezer Floppen Slopper's Wonderful Water Slides	Oakbrook Terrace	1980–1987		
Electric Park	Plainfield	1904–1932		
Fairyland Park	Lyons	1938–1977		
Forest Park	Forest Park	1908–1922		
Fun Harbor	Waukegan	1992–2008		
FunTown aka KiddyTown Amusement Park (1950–1967)	South Side, Chicago	1967–1982		
Green Oaks Kiddyland	Oak Lawn	1946–1971		
Harlem Park	Rockford	1891–1928		
Hollywood Kiddieland	Chicago	1949–1974		
Joyland Park	South Side, Chicago	1923–1925		
Kiddieland Amusement Park	Melrose Park	1929–2009	Demolished in 2010	
Kiddytown	Norridge	1953–1964		
Luna Park	Chicago	1907–1911		
Old Chicago	Bolingbrook	1975–1980		
Paul Boytons Chutes Park	South Side, Chicago	1894–1907		
Playland Park	Justice	1950–1979		
Riverview Park	Chicago	1904–1967		
Sans Souci Park	South Side, Chicago	1899–1913		
Shireland	Hampshire	1988–1991		
White City	Chicago	1905–1950s	The White City Amusement Park ended operation in 1933, however, the White City roller rink was closed in 1949. Then changed name to Park City, which closed in 1958.	

=== Indiana ===
Amusement park	City	Years of operation	Notes	Ref.
Enchanted Forest	Chesterton	1957–1991		
Fun Spot Park	Angola	1956–2008		
Hobart Park	Hobart	1920s (c.)	Name unknown; located on Lake George	
Old Indiana Fun Park	Thorntown	1983–1996		
Playland Park	South Bend	1880–1961		
Riverside Amusement Park	Indianapolis	1903–1970		
Robison Park	Fort Wayne	1896–1919		
Rose Island Amusement Park	Charlestown	1923–1937		
Splash Down Dunes Water Park	Chesterton	1994–2009		
Sauzer's Kiddieland	Schererville	1949–1993		
White City	Indianapolis	1906–1908		
Wonderland	Indianapolis	1906–1911		

=== Iowa ===
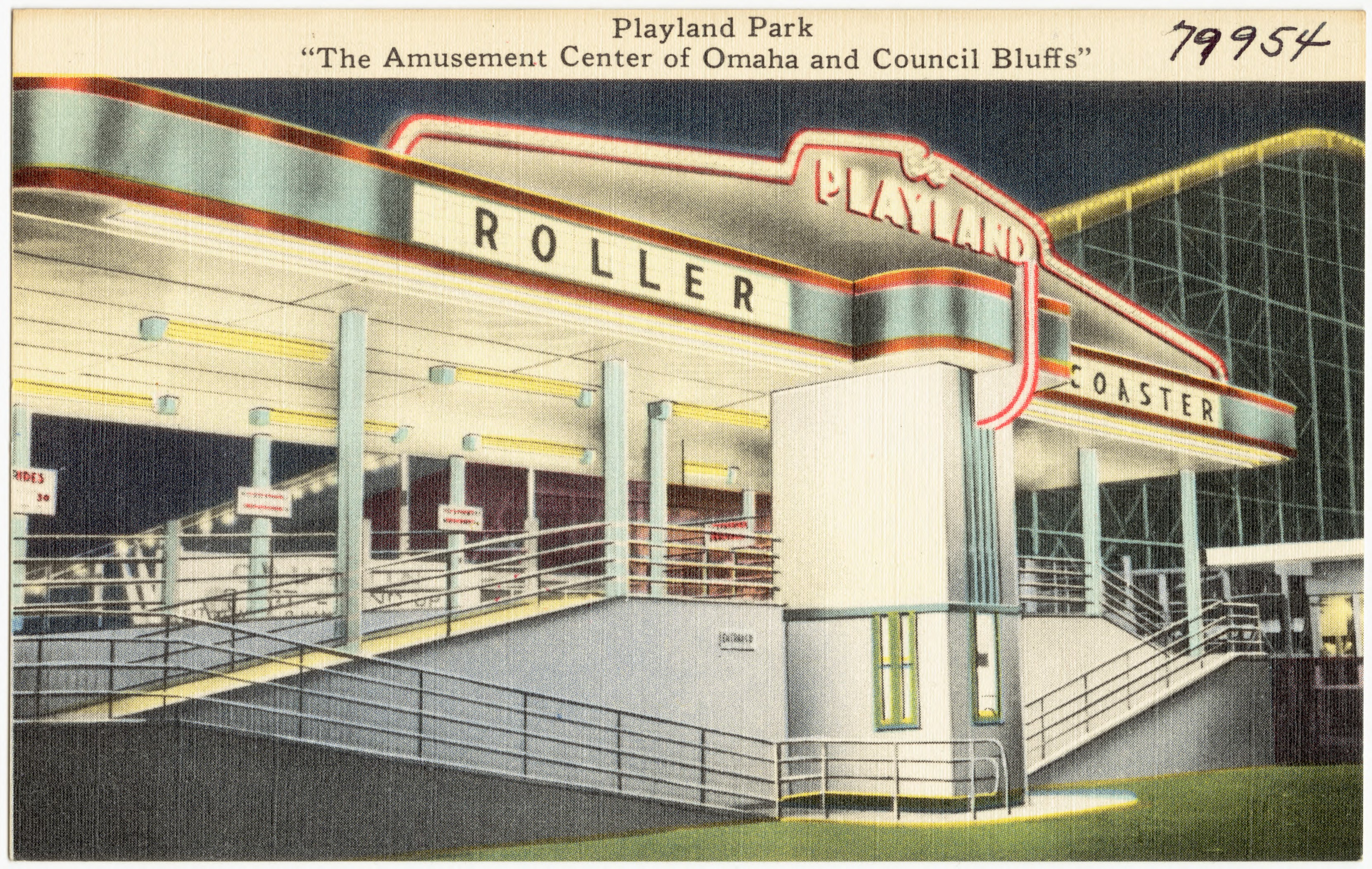
Dodge Park Playland, c. 1950

Amusement park	City	Years of operation	Notes	Ref.
Dodge Park Playland	Council Bluffs	1948–1970		
Electric Park	Waterloo	1902–1933		
Riverview Park	Des Moines	1915–1978		
Wacky Waters Adventure Park	Davenport	1986–2007		
Riverside Park	Sioux City	1890s–1920s		
Lakeview Amusement Park	Carter Lake	1917–1933		
Courtland Beach	Carter Lake	1899–1905		

=== Kansas ===
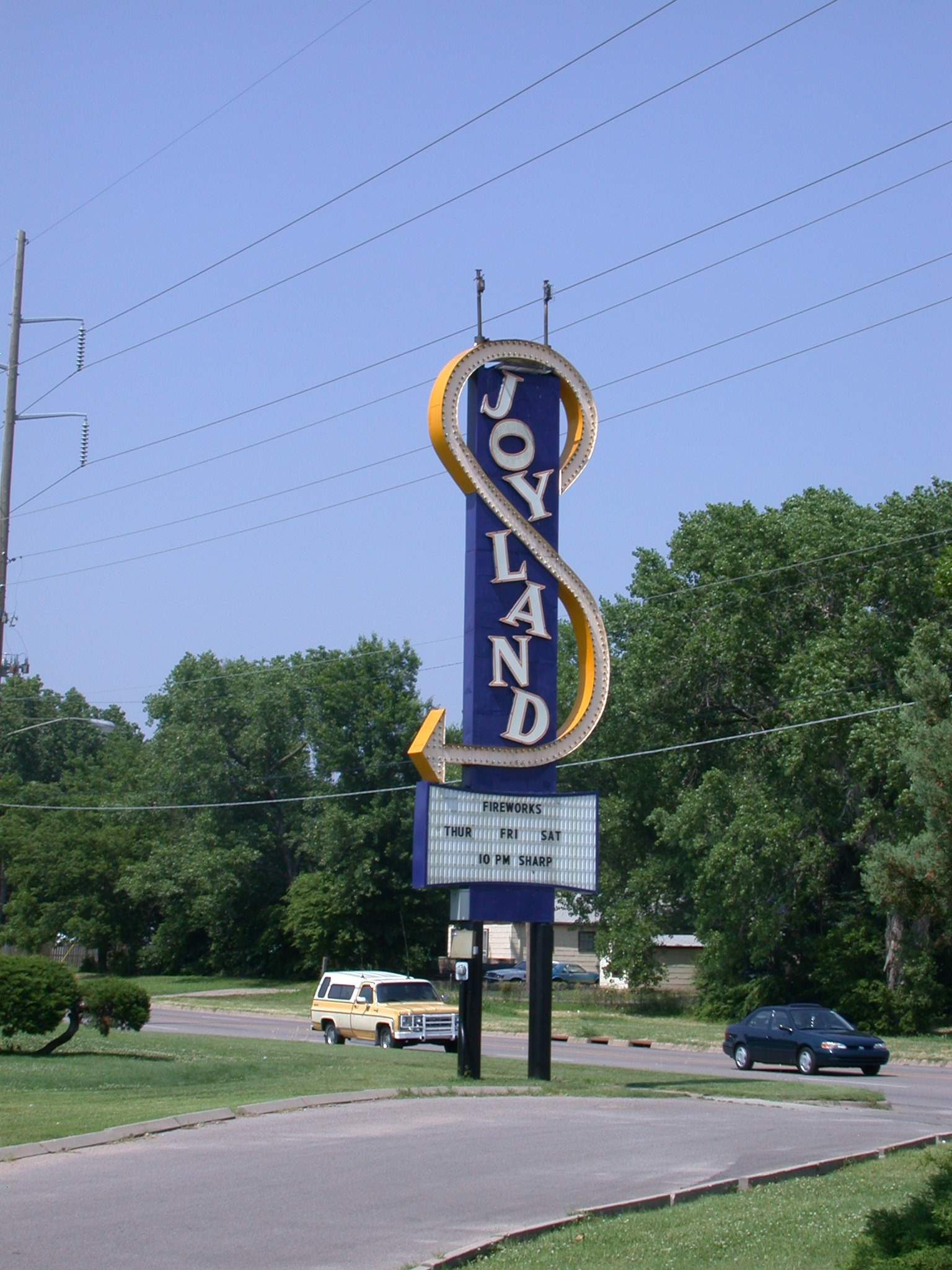
Sign at the entrance to Joyland Amusement Park

Amusement park	City	Years of operation	Notes	Ref.
Clown Town	Hutchinson	1950s–1974		
Schlitterbahn Kansas City	Kansas City	2009–2018		
Boyle's Joyland Kiddie Park	Topeka	????–????		
Frontier Land U.S.A.	Wichita	1960? – 196?	Built to celebrate the Kansas Centennial (1961)	
Joyland Amusement Park	Wichita	1949–2004, 2006		
Kiddieland Amusement Park	Wichita	1959–1974	A shopping mall was built on the former site in 1975.	
Playland Park	Salina	????–????		
Wild West World	Park City	2007		
Wonderland Park	Wichita	1905–1918		

=== Kentucky ===
Amusement park	City	Years of operation	Notes	Ref.
Fontaine Ferry Park	Louisville	1905–1969		
Kaintuck Territory	Benton	1967–1980		
Joyland Park	Lexington	1923–1964		
Ludlow Lagoon	Ludlow	1895–1918		
Tombstone Junction	Cumberland Falls	1960s–1991		

=== Louisiana ===
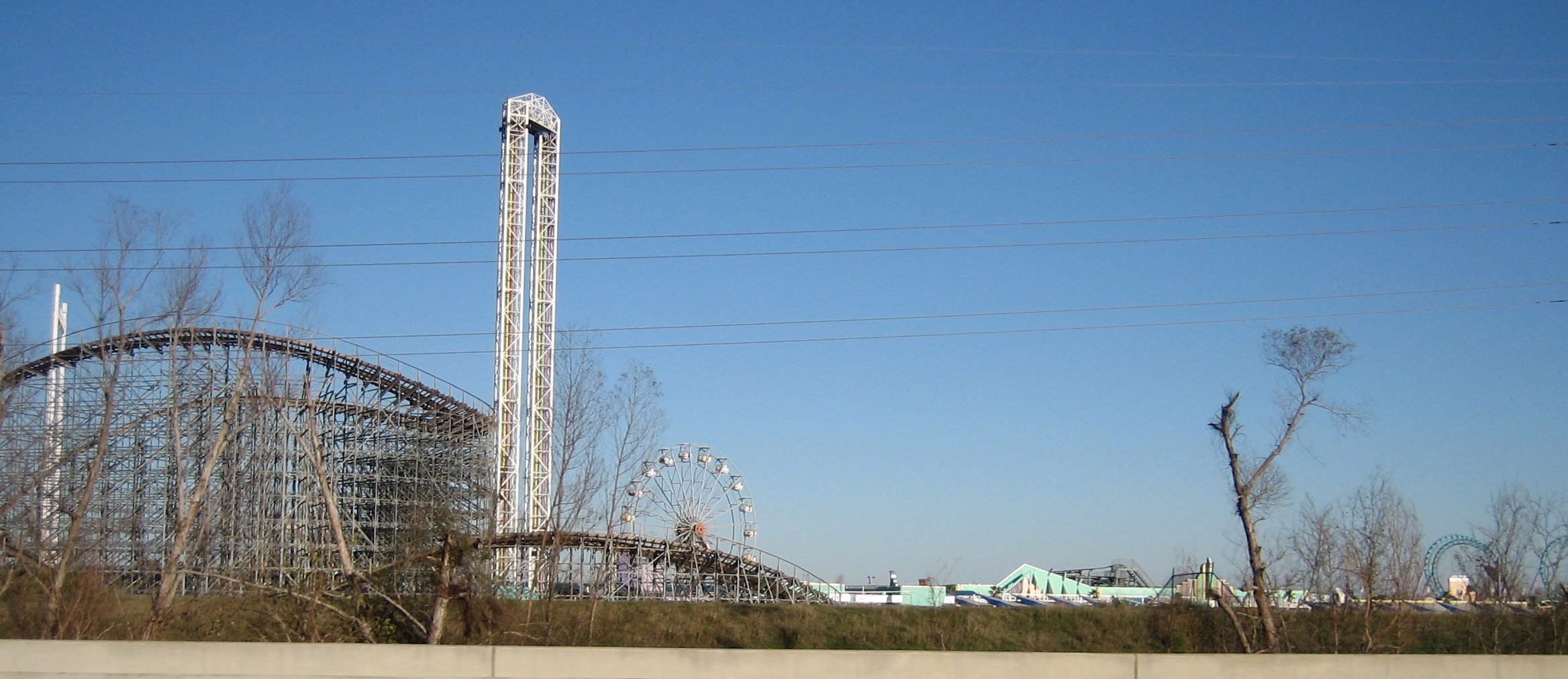
Six Flags New Orléans, which was abandoned after being critically damaged by Hurricane Katrina

Amusement park	City	Years of operation	Notes	Ref.
Coursey's Fantasy Water Park	Baton Rouge	????–????	Redeveloped as Blue Bayou Water Park	
Critter's Creek	Monroe	????–????		
Delta Village	Tallulah	Early 1970s–late 1970s		
Dixie Landin'	Baton Rouge	1999—2025	The adjacent Blue Bayou Water Park continues to operate.	
Fun Fair Park	Baton Rouge	1963–1999	Rides were relocated adjacent to Blue Bayou Water Park and reopened under the new name Dixie Landin'. Both parks were owned and operated by the same organization.	
Hamel's Amusement Park	Shreveport	1970s–1999		
Lincoln Beach	New Orleans	1939–1965		
Lincoln Park	New Orleans	1902–1930		
Pontchartrain Beach	New Orleans	1928–1983		
Six Flags New Orleans	New Orleans	2000–2005	Originally Jazzland; abandoned due to damage caused by Hurricane Katrina	
Waterland USA	Houma	1987–2009		
White City	New Orleans	1907–1913		

=== Maryland ===
Amusement park	City	Years of operation	Notes	Ref.
Bay Shore Park	Edgemere	1906–1946		
Carlin's Park	Baltimore	1918–1959	Also known as Liberty Heights Park	
Electric Park	Baltimore	1896–1915		
Enchanted Forest	Ellicott City	1955–1992, 1994–1995		
Frederick Road Park	Baltimore	1920–1925		
Glen Echo Park	Glen Echo	1911–1968	Reappropriated as cultural and arts center in 1971	
Gwynn Oak Park	Woodlawn	1893–1973	Closed after damage sustained by Hurricane Agnes	
Marshall Hall	Charles County	1890s–1980		
Pen Mar Park	Washington County	1877–1943		
Playland Amusement Park	Ocean City	1965–1981		
Pleasure Island	Edgemere	1947–1962	Also known as New Bay Shore Park	
Riverview Park	Baltimore	1890–1929		
Row's Park	Clear Spring	1928–1967		
Six Flags America	Woodmore	1974–2025		
Six Flags Power Plant	Baltimore	1985–1989		
The Wildlife Preserve	Largo	1974–1980	Drive-thru safari park; absorbed by Six Flags America	
Tolchester Beach	Rock Hall	1887–1962		

=== Massachusetts ===
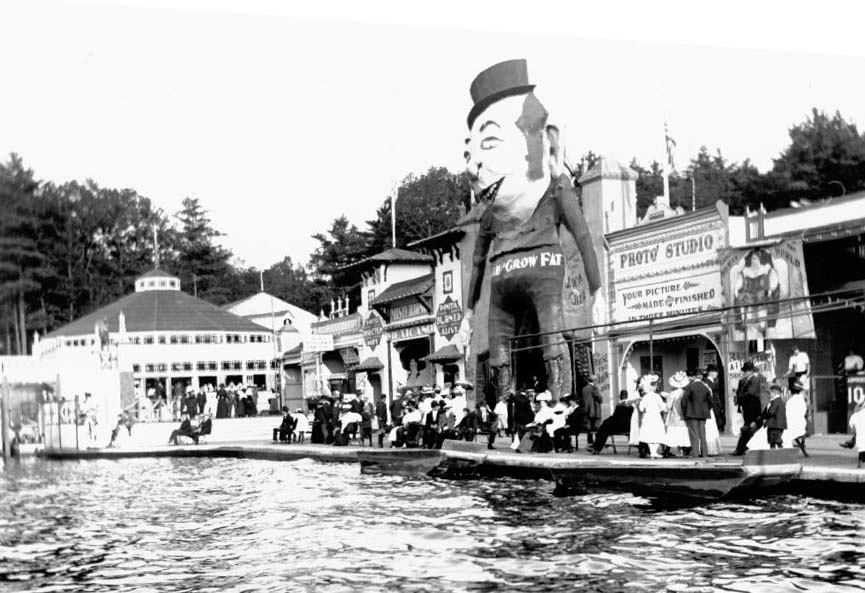
White City (Shrewsbury, Massachusetts) in 1908. The colossal figure of "King Dodo" guards the entrance to the fun house.

Amusement park	City	Years of operation	Notes	Ref.
Acushnet Park	New Bedford	1916-1954	Damaged by hurricanes in 1938, 1944, & 1954	
Jolly Cholly's Funland	North Attleborough	1950–1979		
King's Castle Land	Whitman	1964–1994		
Lakeview Park	Dracut	1895–1970		
Lincoln Park	North Dartmouth	1894–1987		
Lincoln Park	Worcester	1890s–1907?		
Merrimack Park	Methuen	1898–1938	Destroyed by the 1938 New England Hurricane.	
Mountain Park	Holyoke	1894–1987		
Norumbega Park	Auburndale	1897–1963		
Paragon Park	Hull	1905–1984		
Pirate's Fun Park	Salisbury Beach	1979–2004		
Pleasure Island	Wakefield	1959–1969		
Shaheen's Fun-O-Rama	Salisbury Beach	1954–1990	It was originally called Fun-O-Rama.	
Whalom Park	Lunenburg	1893–2000		
White City	Shrewsbury	1905–1960		
Wonderland Amusement Park	Revere	1906–1911		

=== Michigan ===
Amusement park	City	Years of operation	Notes	Ref.
Edgewater Park	Detroit	1927–1981		
Electric Park	Detroit	1906–1927	Also known as Luna Park and Riverview Park	
Flint Park	Flint	1921–1961		
House of David, Eden Springs Park & Zoo	Benton Harbor	1908–1973		
Jefferson Beach	St. Clair Shores	1927–1959		
Jenison Electric Park	Holland	1892–1920s		
Lake Lansing Amusement Park	Ingham County	1934–1974		
Memory Lane Arcade	Frankenmuth	1975–2004		
Park Island	Lake Orion	1915–1955		
Pleasure Island Water Theme Park	Muskegon	1981–1997		
Ramona Park	Grand Rapids	1897–1955		
Riverland Amusement Park	Sterling Heights	1935–2003	It was a private park.	
Silver Beach Amusement Park	St. Joseph	1891–1971		
Six Flags AutoWorld	Flint	1984–1994		
Tashmoo Park	Algonac	1897–1951		
Toledo Beach Amusement Park	La Salle Township	1907–1962	Demolished, now the Toledo Beach Marina	
Wenona Beach Amusement Park	Bangor Township	1887–1964		
Walled Lake Park	Walled Lake	1919–1968		

=== Minnesota ===
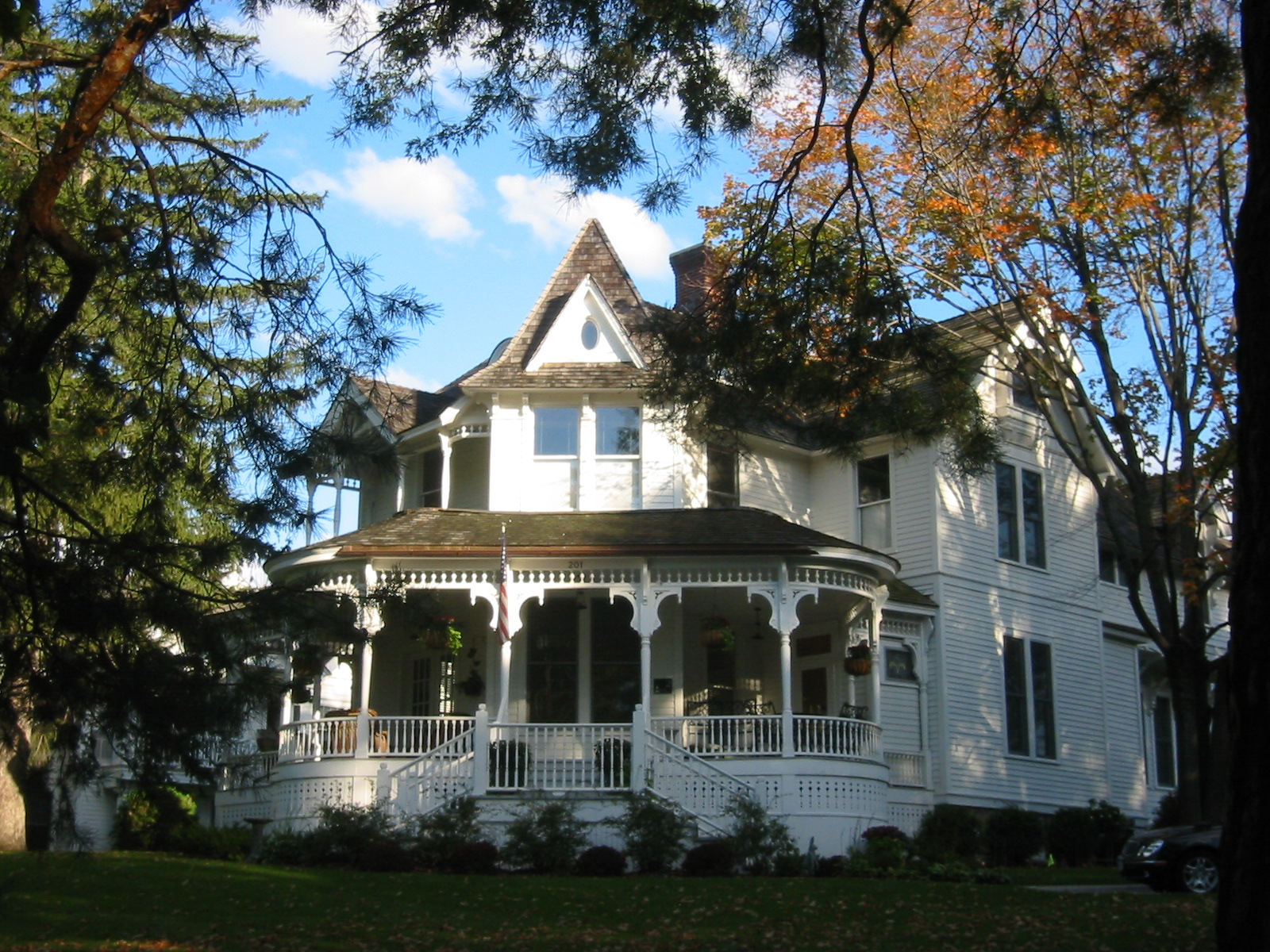
The Wyer House, which served as the home for park managers; Excelsior Amusement Park, Excelsior, Minnesota

Amusement park	City	Years of operation	Notes	Ref.
Big Island Park	Orono	1906–1911		
Excelsior Amusement Park	Excelsior	1925–1973		
Fairyland Park	Marble	1948–1972		
Water Park of America	Bloomington	2006–2017		
Wildwood Amusement Park	Mahtomedi	1889–1932		
Wonderland Amusement Park	Minneapolis	1905–1911		

=== Mississippi ===
Amusement park	City	Years of operation	Notes	Ref.
Maywood Beach	Olive Branch	1931–2003		
Royal Land	Meridian	1960s–1970s		

=== Missouri ===
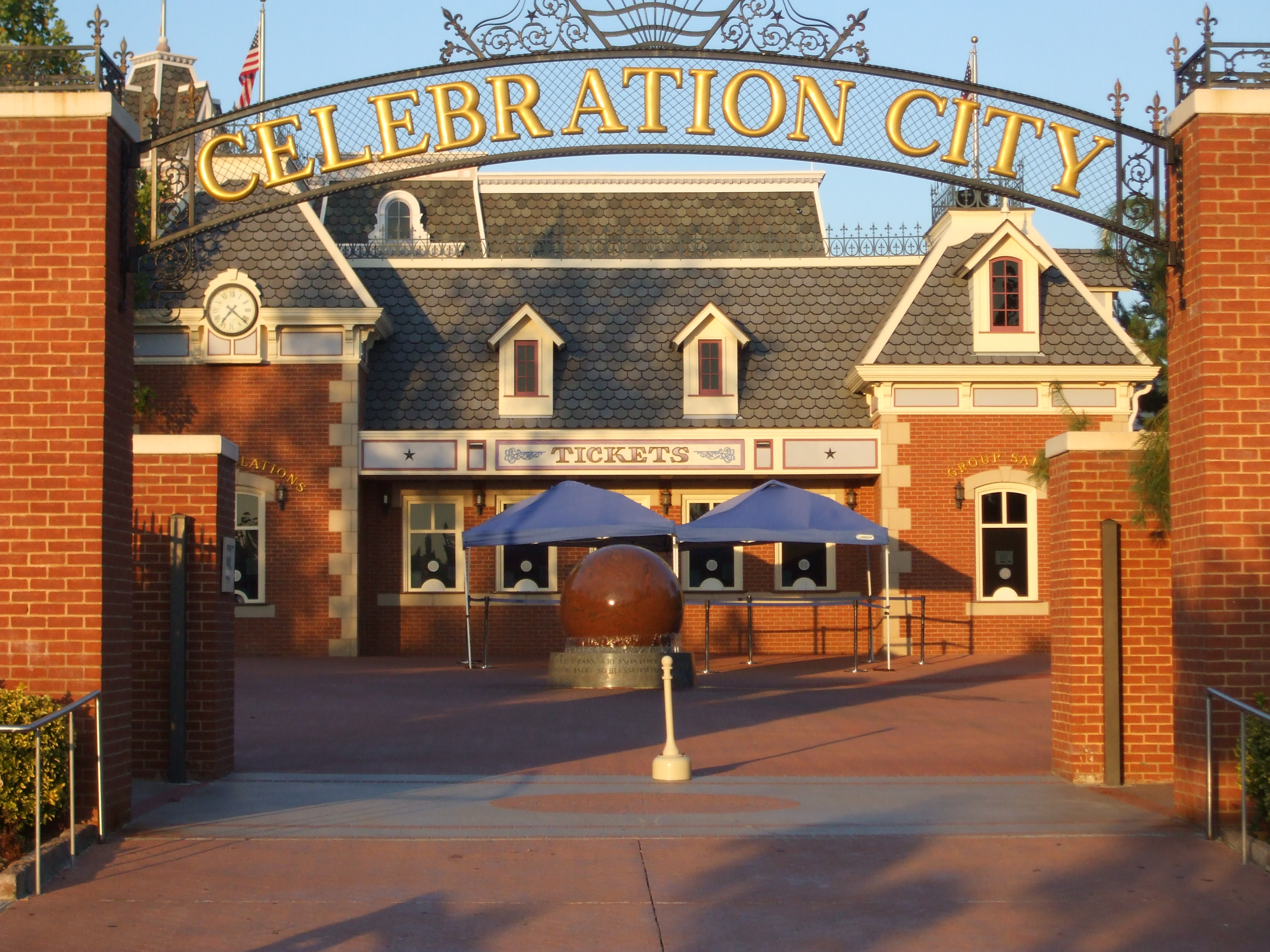
Celebration City's gate, Branson, Missouri

Amusement park	City	Years of operation	Notes	Ref.
Branson USA	Branson	1999–2001		
Celebration City	Branson	2003–2008		
Chain of Rocks Amusement Park	St. Louis	1927–1978		
Delmar Garden	St. Louis	1908–1919	The park closed due to people using their own automobiles driving out to the country instead of using the streetcar.	
Electric Park	Kansas City	1899–1906, 1907–1925		
Fairyland Park	Kansas City	1923–1977		
Forest Park	Kansas City	1903–1912		
Forest Park Highlands	St. Louis	1896–1963		
The Fort	Osage Beach	????–????		
Holiday Hill	St. Louis	1955–1975	All of the rides moved to Fun Fair at Chain of Rocks Amusement Park.	
Hydro Adventures	Poplar Bluff	2003–2020		
Lake Contrary Amusement Park	St. Joseph	1890–1960		
Mannion's Park	St. Louis	1899–1947	Mannion's Park and Souter's Park were Downs' Park original names.	
West End Heights	St. Louis	1904–1912		
Westlake Park	St. Louis	1924–1955		
White City Amusement Park	Springfield	1907–1912		

=== Montana ===
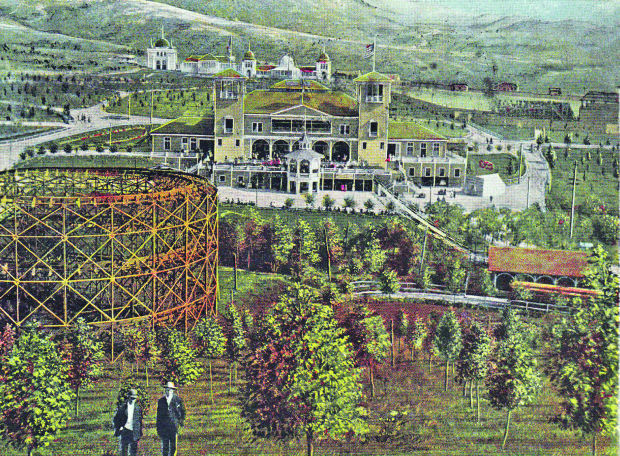
Columbia Gardens, 1905

Amusement park	City	Years of operation	Notes	Ref.
Columbia Gardens	Butte	1899–1973		
Leon Park	Miles City	1934–1966	Contained an arcade and other concessions	

=== Nebraska ===
Amusement park	City	Years of operation	Notes	Ref.
Krug Park	Omaha	1895–1940		
Carter Lake Kiddieland and Pleasure Pier	Omaha	1949–1959		
Peony Park	Omaha	1919–1994		

=== Nevada ===
Amusement park	City	Years of operation	Notes	Ref.
Coney Island	Reno	????–????		
Funland Amusement Park	Las Vegas	1954–1955		
MGM Grand Adventures	Las Vegas	1993–2002		
Old Vegas	Henderson	1978–1986	Briefly known as Westworld	
Ponderosa Ranch	Incline Village	1967–2004		
Wet 'n Wild	Las Vegas	1985–2004		
Great Basin Adventure	Reno	1983–2010	Closed due to budget constraints.	

=== New Hampshire ===
Amusement park	City	Years of operation	Notes	Ref.
Benson's Wild Animal Farm / New England Playworld	Hudson	1924–1987		
Contoocook River Amusement Park	Penacook	?–1925		
Pine Island Park	Manchester	1902–1963		
Six Gun City	Jefferson	1957–2014		
Surf Coaster USA	Weirs Beach	1983–2006		
Heritage New Hampshire	Glen	1976–2006		

=== New Jersey ===
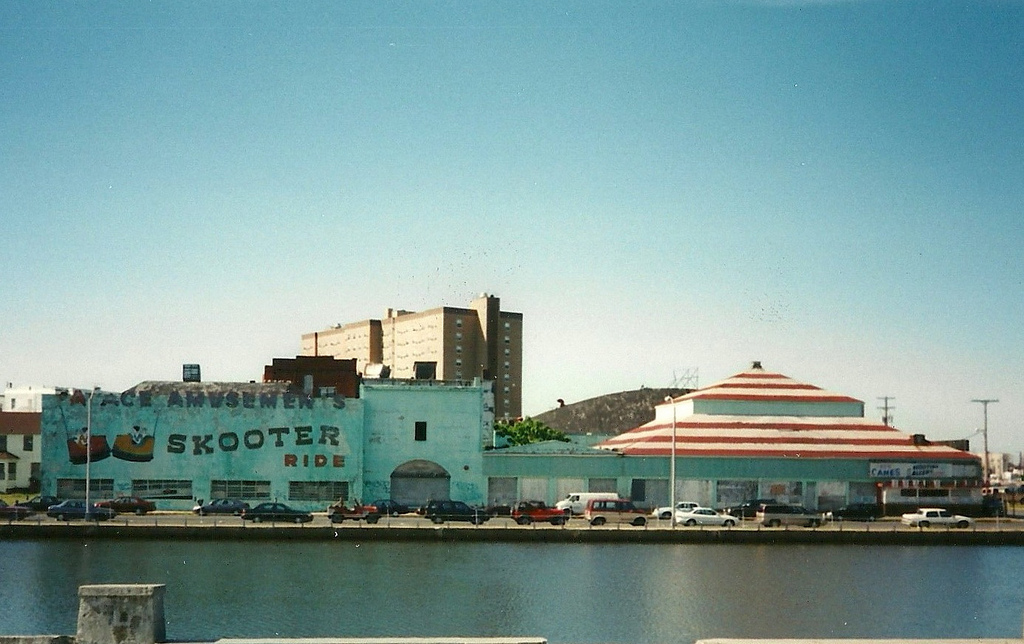
Palace Amusements, 1997

Amusement park	City	Years of operation	Notes	Ref.
Action Mountain/Ski Mountain	Pine Hill	1984–1986		
Action Park/Mountain Creek Park	Vernon	1978–1996, 2014–2016		
Alcyon Park	Pitman	1890s–1944		
Bertrand Island	Mount Arlington	1910–1983		
Bowcraft Amusement Park	Scotch Plains	1946–2018		
Brigantine Castle	Brigantine	1976–1984		
Burlington Island Park	Burlington	?–1928		
Dinosaur Beach	Wildwood	1905–1998	Morey's Piers purchased it in 1999.	
Eldorado Amusement Park	Weehawken	1891–1894		
Fairy Tale Forest	Oak Ridge	????–????		
Fairyland Park	Springfield	1960s–1982		
Fun Pier	Wildwood	1957–1987		
Funtown Pier	Seaside Park	1957–2012	Destroyed by Hurricane Sandy in 2012.	
Gillian's Wonderland Pier	Ocean City	1965–2024		
Kid's World	Long Branch	1985–1987		
Olympic Park	Irvington and Maplewood	1887–1965	Demolished in 1979	
Palace Amusements	Asbury Park	1888–1988		
Palisades Amusement Park	Bergen County	1898–1971		
Riverview Park	Pennsville	1891–1967		
Steeplechase Park	Asbury Park	Early 20th Century		
Steeplechase Park	Atlantic City	Early 20th Century		
Tivoli Pier	Atlantic City	1981–1989		
Warner Bros. Jungle Habitat	West Milford	1972–1976		
Washington Park	Westville	1895–1913	Herbert and Oliver Stetser changed their attention to Point Breeze Park in Philadelphia in 1914, abandoning Washington Park, and may have moved some equipment there from Washington Park. Remaining structures were demolished at the beginning of 1914, and replacement by a large manufacturing facility was announced, although this seems not to have been built until after the war.	
Uncle Milty's	Bayonne	?–1970s		

=== New Mexico ===
Amusement park	City	Years of operation	Notes	Ref.
The Beach	Albuquerque	1987–2005		
President's Park	Carlsbad	1960s?–1990s		

=== New York ===
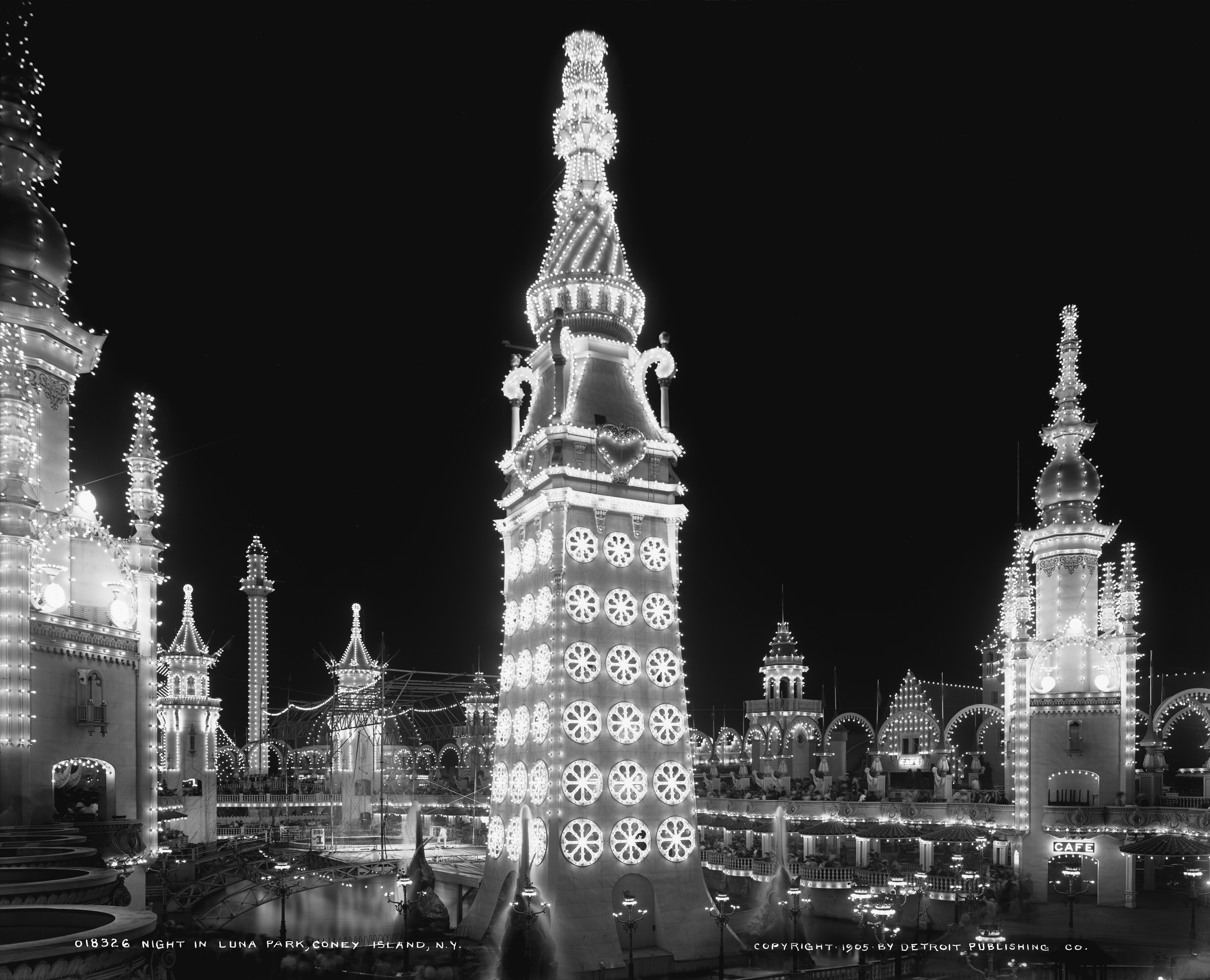
Interior of Luna Park, Coney Island at night, 1905. Electric tower in the foreground. New York, United States of America.

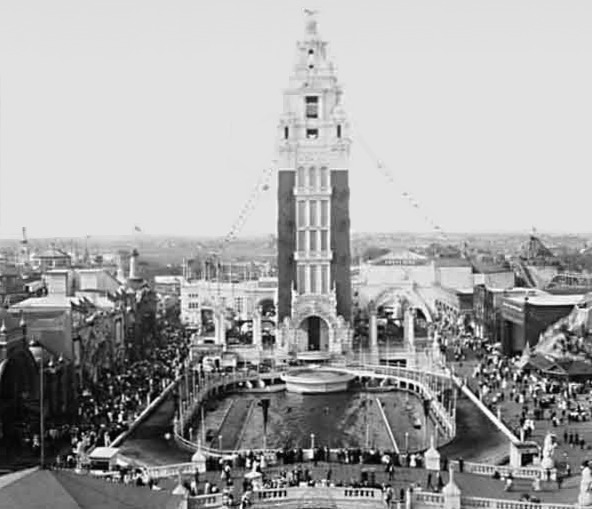
Dreamland tower and lagoon, Brooklyn, 1907

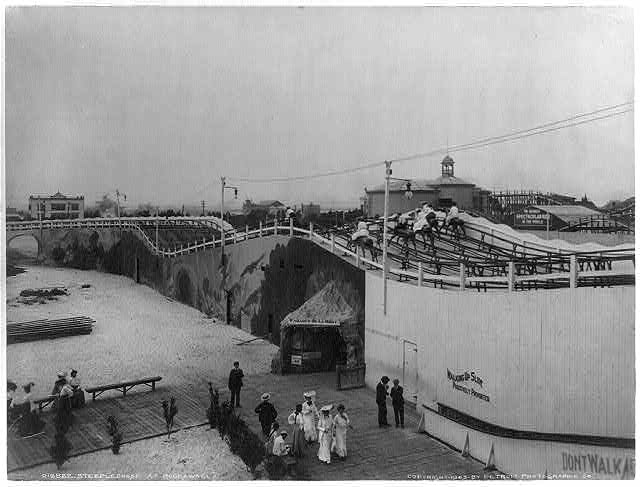
The steeplechase ride, Steeplechase Park, Coney Island, New York, United States of America

Amusement park	City	Years of operation	Notes	Ref.
Adventurer's Inn	Flushing, Queens	1950s–1970s	The park was renamed to Great Adventure Amusement Park. In the 1970s New York's Public Development Corp (PDC) took the land via eminent domain for the purpose of an industrial development. The property remained vacant and abandoned for years until being occupied by a movie complex, Toys R Us (closed in 2018) and office buildings.	
Al-Tro Island Park	Menands	Late 19th Century–early 1920s		
Astroland	Coney Island, Brooklyn	1962–2008	Absorbed by Luna Park	
Boardwalk Park (Karnival Kourt)	Irondequoit (Sea Breeze)	1917–1962	Opened in 1917 on a parcel of land next to Sea Breeze Park (Seabreeze) after a land dispute with the RW&O Railroad necessitated the moving of amusements from the Lake Ontario shore across Woodman (Culver) Road. Severely damaged by fire in 1932. Rebuilt as Boardwalk Park. Construction began on a drive-in movie theatre in 1960, which was completed, but never opened to the public. The land went up for auction in 1966.	
Carson City and Indian Village	Catskill	1958–1997		
Celoron Amusement Park	Celoron	1893–1962		
Cimarron City	Monticello	1950s–1960s		
Cloud 9	Olean	1964–1976		
Dreamland	Coney Island, Brooklyn	1904–1911		
Dreamland	Coney Island, Brooklyn	2009		
Dreamland Park (Glen Haven)	Rochester	1889–1910	A resort on Irondequoit Bay. A hill was flattened into a swamp to build the amusement park by the hotel. The owners announced in September 1910 that amusement operators from Chicago would be making big changes to the park to make it similar to White City. The plans never materialized and the park was shuttered.	
Fairyland Amusement Park	Elmhurst, Queens	????-late 1960s		
Forest Park	Ballston	1904–1927		
Fort George Amusement Park	Washington Heights, Manhattan	1894–1914		
Freedomland U.S.A.	Baychester, Bronx	1960–1964		
Frontier Town	North Hudson	1952-1998		
Gala Amusement Park	East Elmhurst, Queens	1890s–1920s	Also known as North Beach Amusement Park	
Gaslight Village	Lake George	1959–1989		
Golden City	Canarsie, Brooklyn	1907–1939		
Hoffman's Playland	Latham	1952–2014		
Indian Point Amusement Park	Buchanan	1923–1950		
Kiddie-Park	Howard Beach, Queens	1952–1990s		
Kiddieland	Oceanside	1953–1976	Also known as Jazzbo-Land	
Land of Makebelieve	Jay	1954–1979		
Long Branch Amusement Park	Onondaga County	1882–1938	Absorbed by Long Branch Park	
Luna Park	Coney Island, Brooklyn	1903–1944		
Luna Park	Olcott	1898–1926	Also known as Luna Amusement Park; destroyed by fire in 1927	
Luna Park	Rexford	1901–1933	Also known as Dolle's Park, Colonnade Park, Palisades Park, and Rexford Park	
Magic Forest	Lake George	1963–2018		
McCullough's Kiddie Park	Coney Island	1950s–2012		
Niagara Splash Park	Niagara Falls	1988–1991, 1993–1996, 2005–2006	Later known as Fallsville Splash Park	
Nunley's	Baldwin	1940–1995		
Nunley's Happyland	Bethpage	1951–1978	Later known as Smiley's Happyland	
Olympic Park	Rochester	1931–1982		
Ontario Beach Park	Rochester	1885–1919	Today Ontario Beach Park is a county park. It was taken by eminent domain which forced the closure of the amusement park.	
Playland Park	Freeport	1920s–1930s		
Rockaways' Playland	Rockaway Beach, Queens	1902–1987		
Roseland Park	Canandaigua	1925–1985		
Sea Lion Park	Coney Island, Brooklyn	1895–1903		
Starin's Glen Island	New Rochelle	1881–1910		
Steeplechase Park	Coney Island, Brooklyn	1897–1964		
Steeplechase Park	Rockaway Beach, Queens, Queens	Early 20th Century		
Storytown, USA	Queensbury/Lake George	1954–1983	Absorbed by The Great Escape & Splashwater Kingdom	
Suburban Park	Manlius	1898–1973		
Thompson's Amusement Park	Rockaway Beach	1901–1928	Run by LaMarcus Thompson. Became Rockaways' Playland	
Time Town	Bolton Landing	1970–1981		
Waterfun Village	Orleans	1981–1988		

=== North Carolina ===
Amusement park	City	Years of operation	Notes	Ref.
Dowdy's Park	Nags Head	1963–2005		
Ghost Town Village	Maggie Valley	1961–2016		
Lakewood Park	Charlotte	1910–1933		
Frontier Land	Cherokee	1964–1983		

=== Ohio ===
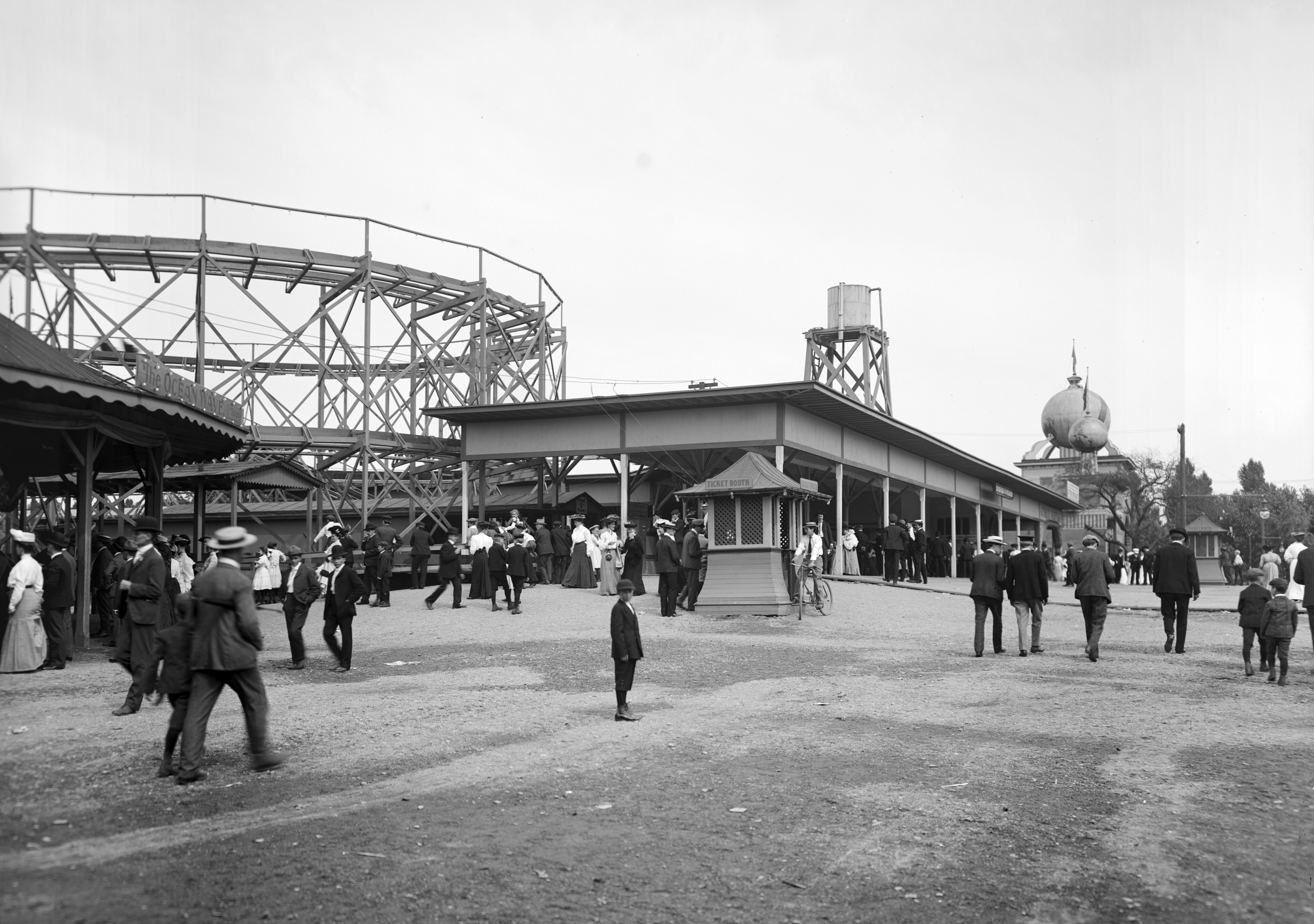
A picture of Euclid Beach Park taken some time between 1895 and 1910, Euclid, Ohio

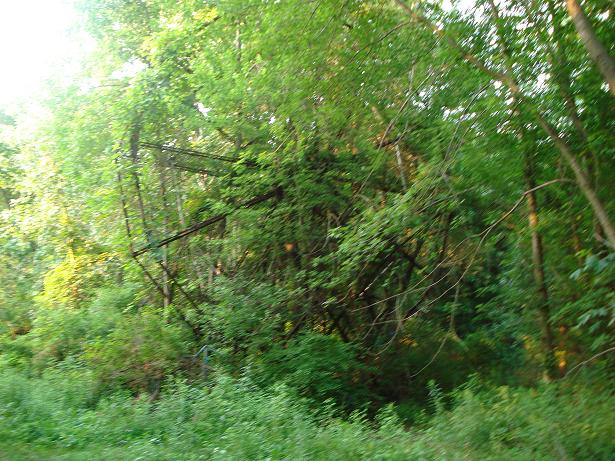
Chippewa Lake Park's Ferris wheel in 2007, left standing like many rides, but overgrown with foliage; Chippewa Lake, Ohio

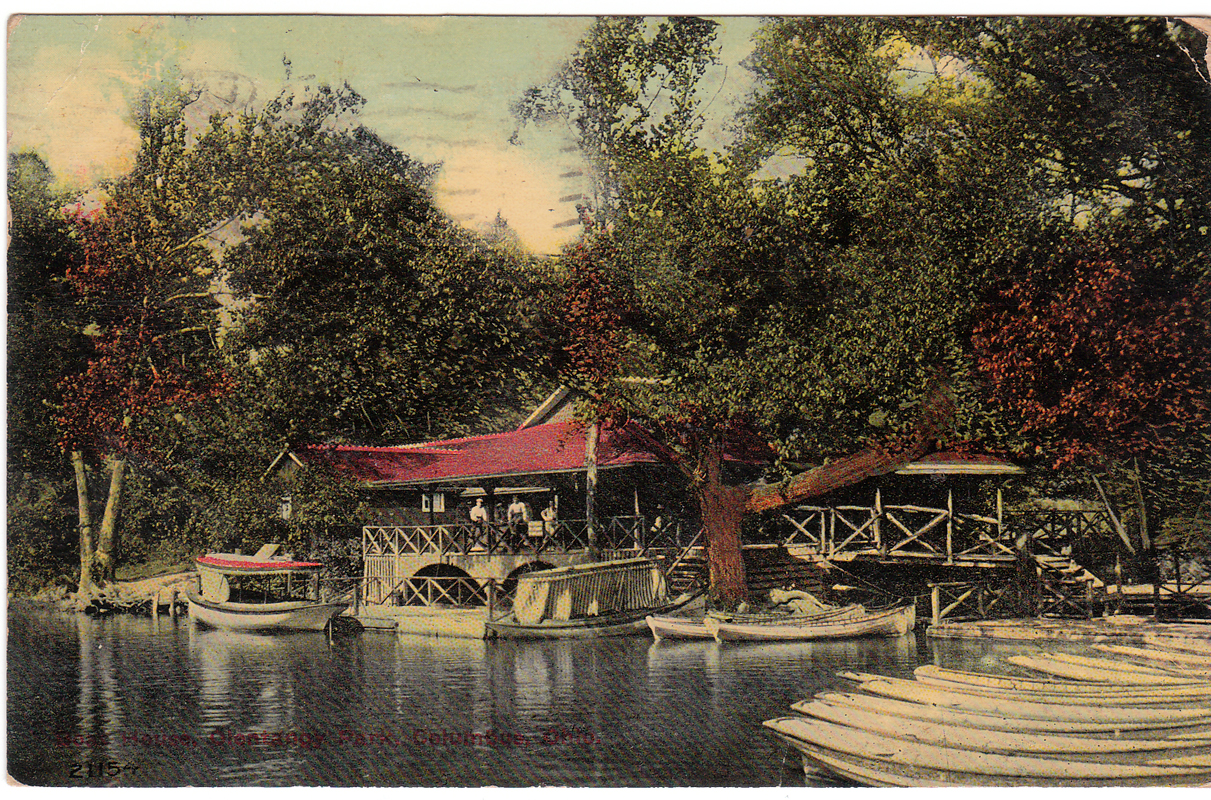
Lake house at Olentangy Park, Columbus, Ohio

Amusement park	City	Years of operation	Notes	Ref.
Americana/LeSourdsville Lake Amusement Park	Middletown	1922–2002		
Argonne Forest Park	Dayton	1925–1945		
Brady Lake Electric Park	Brady Lake	1891–1944		
Buckeye Lake Amusement Park	Buckeye Lake	1906–2007		
Chester Park	Cincinnati	1875–1932	Also called "Rainbow Park"	
Chippewa Lake Park	Chippewa Lake	1878–1978		
Coney Island	Cincinnati	1870–2023	Originally "Ohio Grove", Later "Old Coney"	
Dover Lake Water Park	Sagamore Hills	1946–2005		
Euclid Beach Park	Euclid	1895–1969		
Fairview Amusement Park	Dayton	1897–1915		
Fantasy Farm	Monroe	1900–1991		
Forest Park	Genoa	????–????		
Fort Rapids	Columbus	2006–2016		
Geauga Lake	Aurora	1887–2007		
I-X Indoor Amusement Park	Cleveland	1985–2020		
Idora Park	Youngstown	1899–1984		
Indianola Park	Columbus	1905–1937		
Lakeside Park	Dayton	1960–1995		
Lake Erie Park and Casino	Toledo	1895–1910		
Long Island Beach	Whitewater Township	1924–1956		
Luna Park	Cleveland	1905–1929		
Luna Park	Mansfield	????–????	Also known as Luna Casino Park	
Meyers Lake Park	Canton	1880s–1974	It was originally called Lakeview Park. The park closed due to "bigger parks phased him (i.e., George Sinclair) out and the fire at the ballroom and restaurant absolutely broke his heart."	
Minerva Park	Columbus	1895-1902		
Olentangy Park	Columbus	1896–1937		
Paradise Lake	Guernsey County	1981–1983		
Puritas Springs Park	Cleveland	1898–1958		
Sandy Beach Amusement Park	Indian Lake	1924–1975	Later known as San Juan Amusement Park and Playland Park	
SeaWorld Ohio	Aurora	1970–2000		
Shady Lake Park	Streetsboro	1978–1982		
Silver Lake Amusement Park	Cuyahoga Falls	1874–1917		
Spring Grove	Springfield	????–????		
Stanton Park	Steubenville	circa 1900–1940	The roller rink stayed open past the closing of Stanton Park into the 1950s.	
Summit Beach Park	Akron	1917–1959		
Surf Cincinnati	Cincinnati	1984–2002		
The Beach at Adventure Landing	Mason	1985–2019		
Vollmar's Park	Perrysburg	1900–2001		
Walbridge Park	Toledo	1895–1957		
Wildwater Kingdom	Aurora	2005–2016		
White City	Dayton	1907–1910		
Wildwood Water Park	Columbia Township	????–????		
Yellow Duck Park	Canfield	1975–2007		

=== Oklahoma ===
Amusement park	City	Years of operation	Notes	Ref.
Bell's Amusement Park	Tulsa	1951–2006		
Delmar Gardens	Oklahoma City	1902–1910		
Eagle Park	Cache	1957–1985		
Doe Doe Park	Lawton	1945–1985		
Electric Park	Blackwell	????–????		
Lakeview Amusement Park	Tulsa	1947–1976		
Skyline Amusement Park	Jenks	1950s–1970	Renamed Indian Nations Park in 1969	
Sand Springs Lake Park	Sand Springs	1912–1956		
Springlake Amusement Park	Oklahoma City	1924–1981		
Wedgewood Village	Oklahoma City	1958–1969		

=== Oregon ===
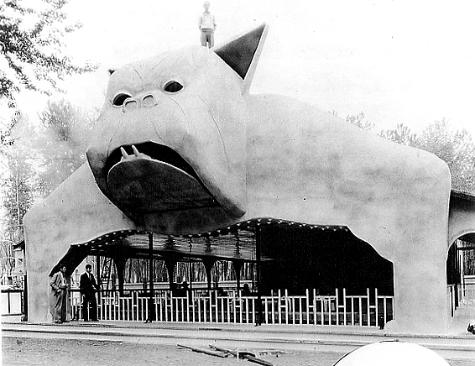
Bumper cars at Lotus Isle, c. 1930

Amusement park	City	Years of operation	Notes	Ref.
Council Crest Amusement Park	Portland	1907–1929		
Jantzen Beach Amusement Park	Portland	1928–1970		
Lotus Isle Amusement Park	Tomahawk Island, Portland	1930–1932		
Pixieland	Otis Junction	1969–1975		
Thrill-Ville USA	Turner	1970s–2007		

=== Pennsylvania ===
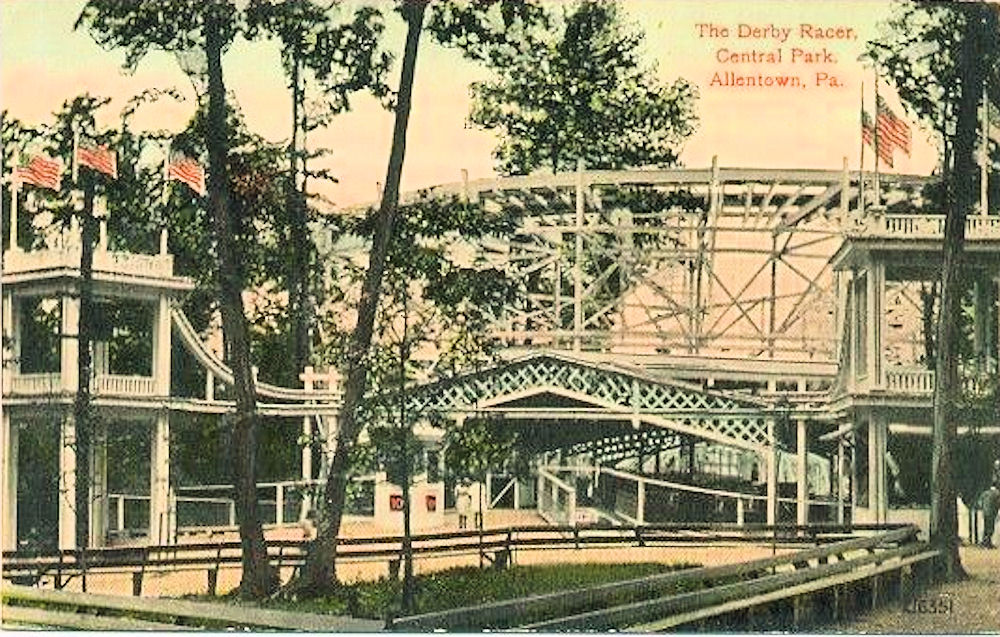
The Derby Racer at Central Park

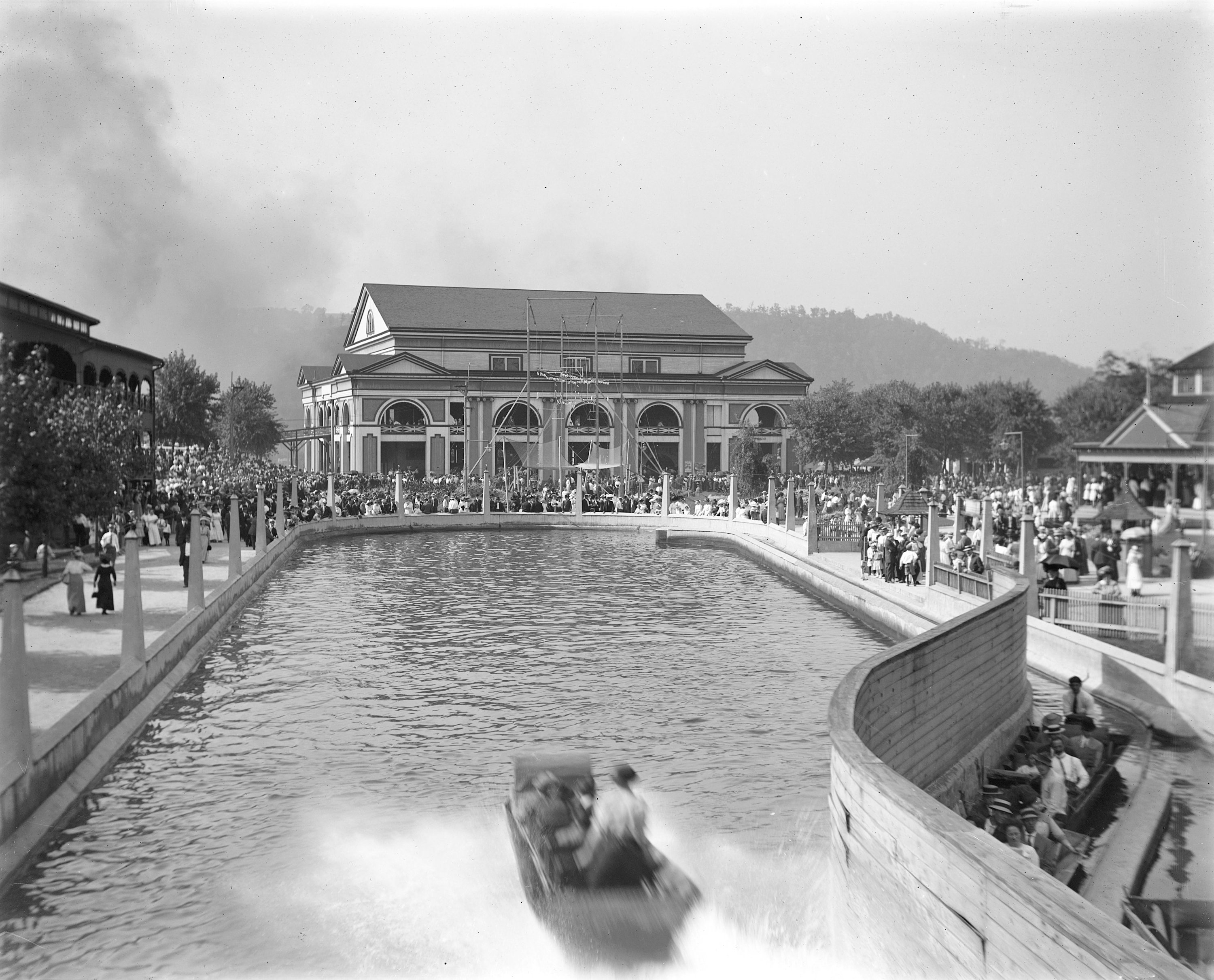
Boats at Luna Park, Pittsburgh, 1909

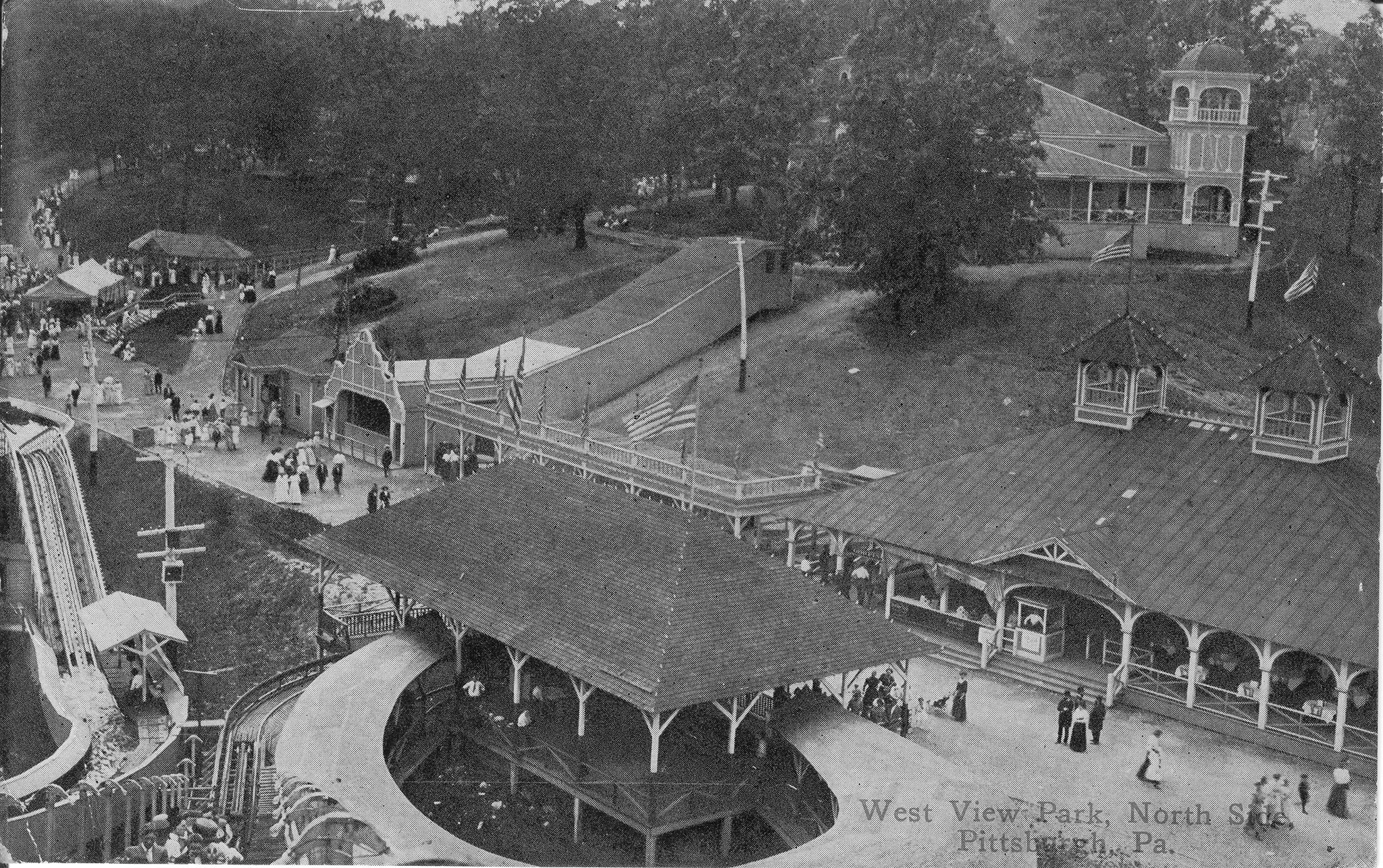
West View Park, 1912

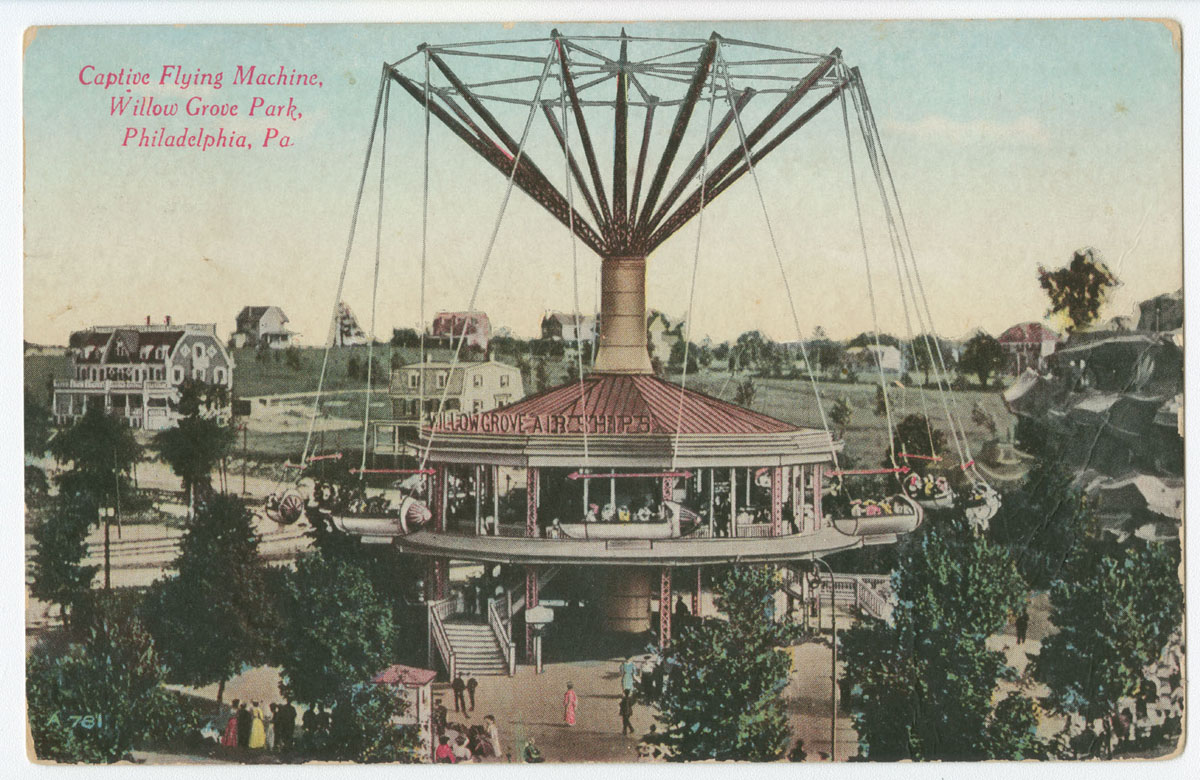
Captive Flying Machine at Willow Grove Park, 1905

Amusement park	City	Years of operation	Notes	Ref.
Alameda Park	Butler	1901–1942		
Aliquippa Park	Aliquippa	1877–1906		
Angela Park	Hazleton	1956–1989		
Beechwood Park	Havertown	1907–1909		
Beury's Grove	Lavelle	1930s–1960s		
Burke Glen Park	Monroeville	1926–1974		
Calhoun Park	Lincoln Place	1895–1910		
Cascade Park	New Castle	1897–1981		
Central Park	Allentown	1893–1951		
Coney Island	Neville Township	1907–1908		
Croops Glen	Hunlock Creek	1908–1941	Closed due to rising insurance costs and WW2.	
Dream City Park	Wilkinsburg	1906–1908	The park was renamed to White City Park from 1907–1908.	
Dreamland Park	Ruscombmanor Township	1950s (c.)		
Eldora Park	Carroll Township	1904–1940s		
Fantasyland	Gettysburg	1959–1980		
Forest Park	Chalfont	1885–1968		
Fun Town	Millcreek	1978–1989	The park's name was changed to Wild Waters Water Park in the 1980s.	
Hanson's Amusement Park	Harveys Lake	1891–1984		
Harmarville Park	Blawnox	????–????		
Homestead Park	Homestead	????–????		
International Village	Gettysburg	1970–1980		
Island Park	Sunbury	1923–1970s		
Junction Park	New Brighton	????–????		
Lakeview Park	Royersford	1900–1987		
Lenape Park	Kittanning	1899–1936		
Lenape Park	West Chester	????–1980		
Luna Park	Johnstown	1905–1922		
Luna Park	Pittsburgh	1905–1909		
Luna Park	Scranton	1906–1916		
Maple Grove Park	Pittsburgh	????–????		
Mapleview Park	Canonsburg	1928–1936		
Mount Holly Park	Mount Holly Springs	1901–1928		
Nay Aug Park	Scranton	1931–1990s		
Northern Electric Park	Clarks Summit	1908–1925	A fire destroyed the major attractions in the park	
Oakford Park	Jeannette	1896–1940	The physical assets of the park were sold at a receiver's sale in Olympia Park for $200.	
Oakwood Amusement Park	Crafton	1900?–1970s		
Olympia Park	McKeesport	1902–1942		
Paxtang Park	Harrisburg	1893–1929		
Playtown Park	Springfield Township	1952–1969		
Poconos' Magic Valley	Bushkill	1977–1982	Renamed Magic Valley and Winona Five Falls c. 1981.	
Rainbow Gardens	White Oak	1924–1968	Began as a roller rink and swimming pool, with an amusement park and drive-in theater added in the 1940s.	
Rock Point Park	Ellwood City	1884–1911		
Rocky Glen Park	Moosic	1886–1987		
Rocky Springs Park	Lancaster	1899–1966, 1979–1980		
Rolling Green Park	Hummels Wharf	1908–1971		
Sanatoga Park	Pottstown	1893–1937		
Sans Souci Park	Hanover Township	1880–1970		
Wilkes-Barre/Nanticoke environs		????–????		
Shady Grove Park	Lemont Furnace	1905–1974		
Shohola Glen Amusement Park	Shohola	1884–1907		
Southern Park	Carrick	????–????		
Swatara Park	Middletown	1955–1968		
Tropical Island	Easton	Early 1940s		
West Point Park	Upper Gwynedd Township	1868–1988		
West View Park	Pittsburgh	1906–1977		
White City	Philadelphia	1898–1912		
White Swan Park	Moon Township	1955–1990		
Williams Grove Amusement Park	Mechanicsburg	1850–2005		
Willow Grove Park	Willow Grove	1896–1975		
Willow Mill Park	Mechanicsburg	1931–1996		
Woodside Amusement Park	Philadelphia	1897–1955		

=== Rhode Island ===
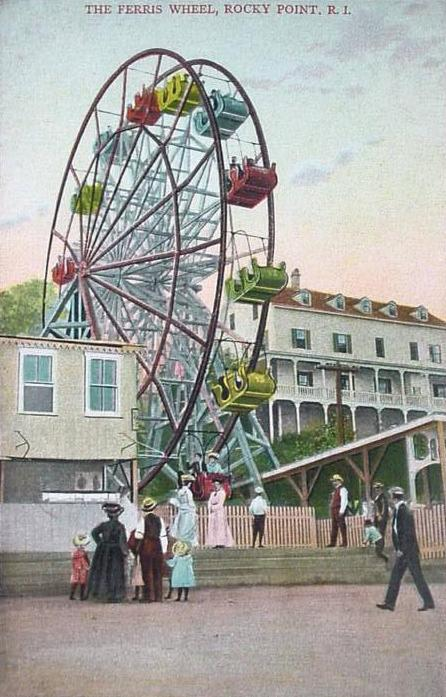
Rocky Point Amusement Park, Warwick, Rhode Island

Amusement park	City	Years of operation	Notes	Ref.
Crescent Park	East Providence	1886–1979		
Easton's Beach	Newport	1913–1938	Destroyed by the 1938 New England Hurricane.	
Enchanted Forest	Hopkinton	1971–2005		
Island Park	Portsmouth	1898–1938	Destroyed by the 1938 New England Hurricane.	
Oakland Beach Park	Warwick	1880s–1970s		
Rocky Point Amusement Park	Warwick	1847–1995		
Vanity Fair	East Providence	????–????		

=== South Carolina ===
Amusement park	City	Years of operation	Notes	Ref.
Astro Needle Amusement Park	Myrtle Beach	1970–1981	The park closed due to competition with Pavilion Amusement Park.	
Echo Valley	Cleveland	????–????		
Fort Caroline	Myrtle Beach	????–????		
Fun World Amusement Park	North Myrtle Beach	????–????		
Gay Dolphin Amusement Park	Myrtle Beach	1949–1968		
Hard Rock Park	Myrtle Beach	2008–2009	Later known as Freestyle Music Park	
Heritage USA	Fort Mill	1978–1989		
Magic Harbor	Surfside Beach	1954–mid 1990s	It was originally named PirateLand.	
Myrtle Beach Pavilion	Myrtle Beach	1948–2006		
Springs Park	Lancaster	1940s–1980s		
Sun Fun Amusement Park	North Myrtle Beach	1970–1986	The park was torn down to make room for a Kroger grocery store.	

=== South Dakota ===
Amusement park	City	Years of operation	Notes	Ref.
Bedrock City	Custer	1966–2015		

=== Tennessee ===
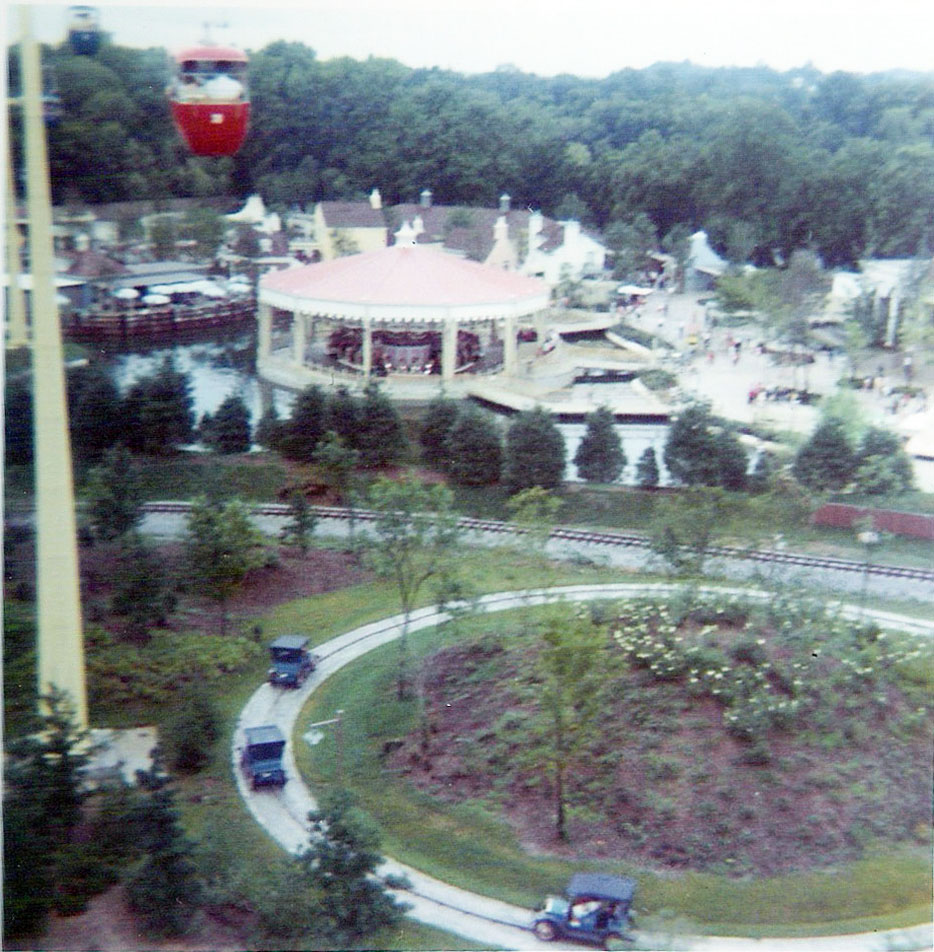
View from the Skyride circa 1975. The "Tin Lizzies" old-timey car ride is visible. Opryland USA, Nashville, Tennessee.

Amusement park	City	Years of operation	Notes	Ref.
Adventure River	Memphis	1985–1998		
Bud Boogie Beach	Memphis	1987–1997		
Fair Park	Nashville	1946–1992		
Fun Mountain	Gatlinburg	1993–2000		
Libertyland	Memphis	1976–2005		
Magic World Kid's Park	Pigeon Forge	1972–1994		
Ogle's Water Park	Pigeon Forge	????–????		
Ogle's Water Park	Sevierville	1972–2002	Demolished in 2003.	
Opryland USA	Nashville	1972–1997		
Porpoise Island	Pigeon Forge	1972–1984		
Tommy Bartlett's Water Circus	Pigeon Forge	1976–1982		
Water Boggan	Pigeon Forge	1970s–1980s		

=== Texas ===
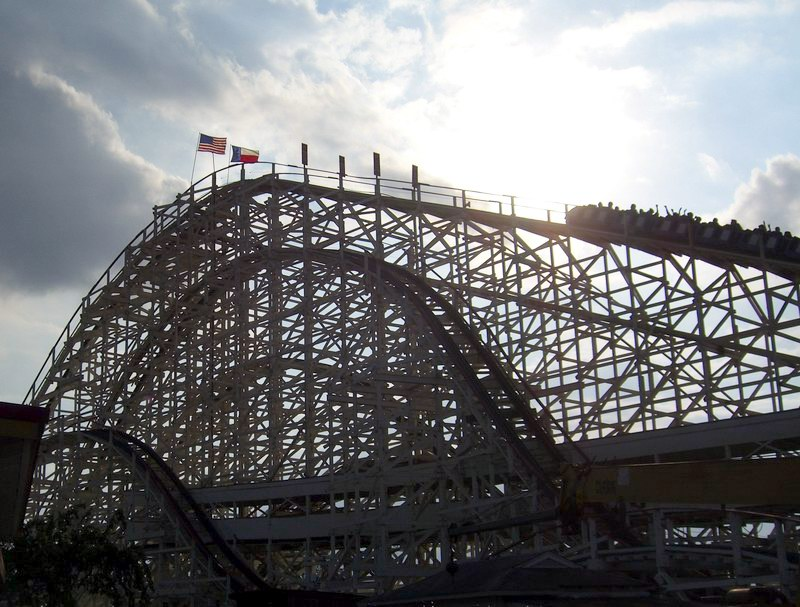
Texas Cyclone at 4:30 p.m. on October 30, 2005, AstroWorld's last day of operation. Houston, Texas.

Amusement park	City	Years of operation	Notes	Ref.
Aquarena Springs	San Marcos	1951–1996		
Beach Amusement Park	Galveston	1920–1950	Formerly operated as Old Mill Park, and later as Crystal Park.	
Boardwalk Fun Park	Grand Prairie	1982–1992		
Busch Gardens	Houston	1971–1973		
Castle Golf and Games	Houston	Early 1970s–2005		
Clown Around	Grand Prairie	????–????		
Dolphin Cove	South Padre Island	????–????		
Earth Quest Adventures	New Caney	Cancelled		
Fame City Waterworks	Houston	1986–2005	Renamed Funplex in 1991.	
Games People Play	Houston	Mid-1980s–mid-1990s		
Hanna–Barbera Land	Spring	1984–1985	Demolished and replaced by Wet 'n' Wild Splashtown	
International Wildlife Park	Grand Prairie	1971–1992		
Joyland Amusement Park	Lubbock	1940s–2022		
Kiddie Wonderland	Houston	1930s-early 1990s		
Luna Park	Houston	1924–1934		
Magic Landing	El Paso	1984–1988		
Penny Whistle Park	Dallas	1967–1995		
Peppermint Park	Houston, Friendswood	Late 1950s–1989, 1989–1994		
Playland Park	Houston	1940–1967		
Playland Park	San Antonio	1943–1980		
Pleasure Pier	Port Arthur	1913–1967		
Sandy Lake Amusement Park	Carrollton	1971–2018		
Sea Arama Marineworld	Galveston	1965–1990		
Sesame Place	Irving	1982–1984		
Seven Seas Marine Life Park	Arlington	1972–1976		
Six Flags AstroWorld	Houston	1968–2005	Purchased by Six Flags in 1975.	
Six Shooter Junction	Harlingen	1974–????		
Splash Amarillo Waterpark	Amarillo	2000–2016		
Splashtown San Antonio	San Antonio	1985–2021		
Sunshine Amusement Park	San Antonio	1980s (c.)		
Vickery Park	Dallas	1940s–1976		
Wet 'n Wild	Garland	????–????		
White Water	Grand Prairie	1982–1986		
Zero Gravity Amusement Park	Dallas	1992–2021		

=== Utah ===
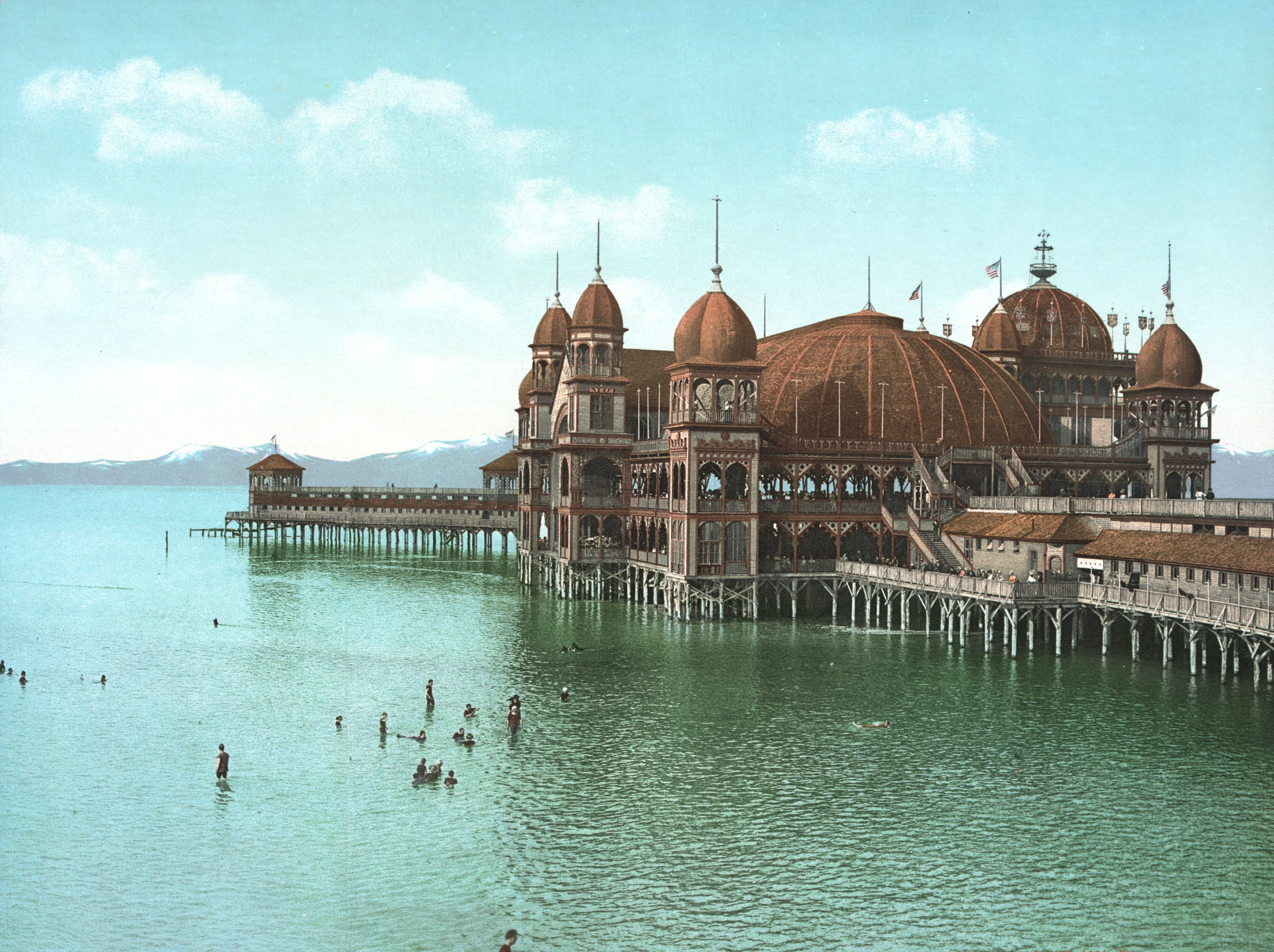
Saltair Pavilion, 1900

Amusement park	City	Years of operation	Notes	Ref.
Adventure Zone at Bear Lake	Garden City	2018		
Evermore Park	Pleasant Grove	2018–2024		
Hollywood Connection	West Valley City	1998–2014		
Hot Springs Holiday Resort	Ogden	????–????	Formerly operated as Utah Hot Springs.	
Saltair Pavilion	Magna	1893–1984	Rebuilt after 1925 fire; land reconfigured as concert venue in 1981.	
Saratoga Resort	Lehi	1884–1983	A record breaking flood caused Saratoga Resort to close.	
Utah Fun Dome	Murray	1983–2004	formerly operated as 49th Street Galleria.	

=== Virginia ===
Amusement park	City	Years of operation	Notes	Ref.
Arlington Beach Park	Arlington	1923–1929		
Buckroe Beach Amusement Park	Hampton	1897–1985		
Forest Hill Park	Richmond	1890s–1932		
Holy Land USA	Bedford	1972–2009		
Idlewood Amusement Park	Richmond	1902–1910s	Named West End Electrical Park from 1906 to the 1910s.	
Lakeside Amusement Park	Salem	1920–1986		
Luna Park	Arlington	1906–1915	Also known as Luna Park, Washington and Luna Park, Washington, D.C.	
Magic Valley Food N' Fun	Winchester	????–2005		
Mountain Park	Roanoke	????–????	Located at the base of Mill Mountain.	
Ocean View Amusement Park	Norfolk	1900s–1978		
Pine Beach Park	Norfolk	1904–1907	Located on the Pine Beach Hotel grounds.	
Seaside Park	Virginia Beach	1912–1940s		

=== Washington ===
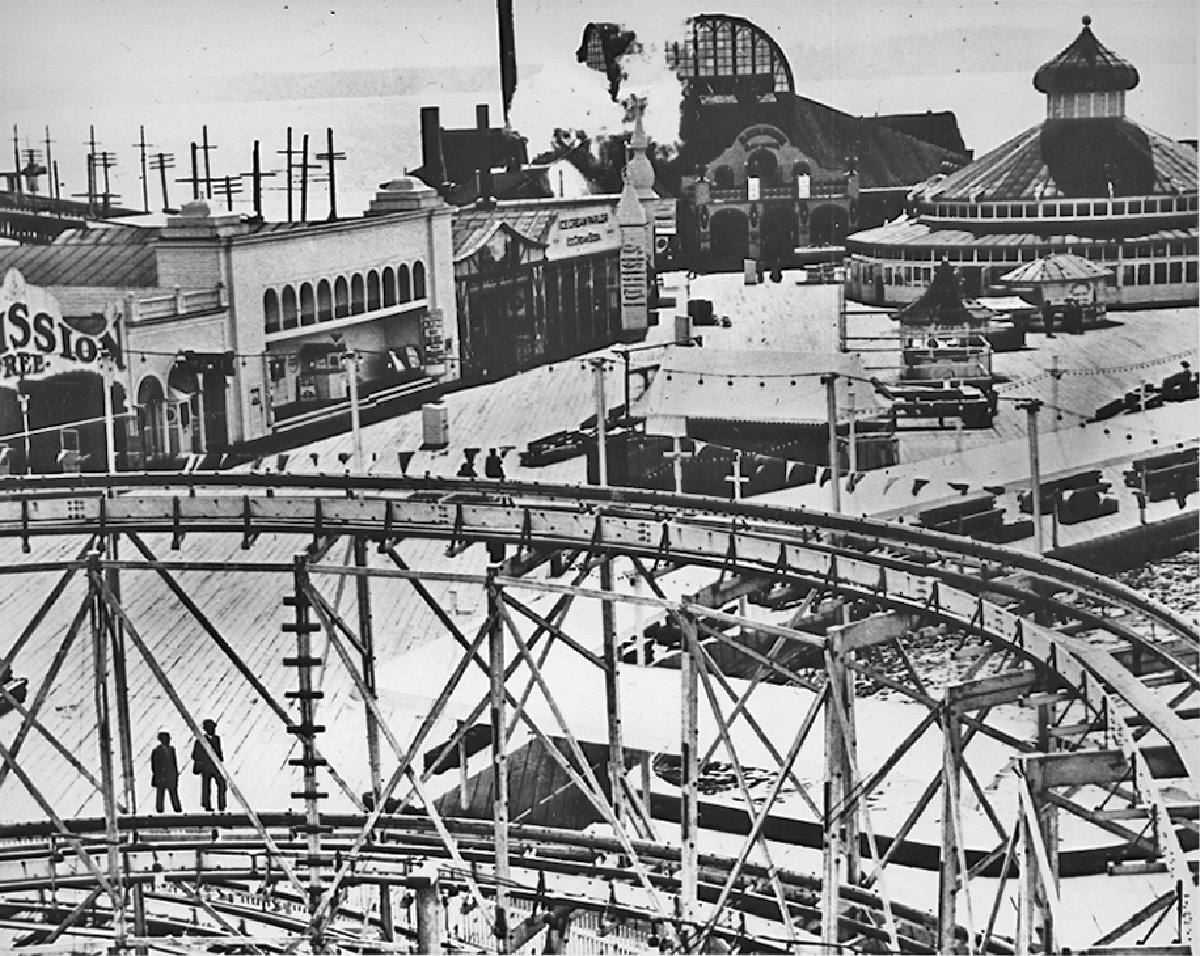
Luna Park Seattle, Washington, 1910. In the foreground is part of the Great Figure Eight roller coaster. At right rear is the Zeum carousel, and to its left the natatorium.

Amusement park	City	Years of operation	Notes	Ref.
Fun Forest Amusement Park	Seattle	1962–2011	Initially named Gayway before changing names at an unknown date.	
Lollipop Park	Bellevue	1960s–1980s		
Luna Park	Seattle	1907–1913		
Natatorium Park	Spokane	1892–1968		
Playland	Bitter Lake, Seattle	1930–1961		
Santafair	Federal Way	1960s–1970s		
The Rides at Long Beach	Long Beach	1970s–2019		
Wild Waves Theme & Water Park	Federal Way	1977–2026	Initially Opened as Enchanted Village.	

=== West Virginia ===
Amusement park	City	Years of operation	Notes	Ref.
Lake Shawnee Amusement Park	Princeton	1926–1967, 1987–1988	Closed following several accidental deaths.	
Luna Park	Charleston	1912–1923		
Rock Springs Park	Chester	1897–1970		
Terrapin Park	Parkersburg	1900–1917		

=== Wisconsin ===
Amusement park	City	Years of operation	Notes	Ref.
Electric Park	Oshkosh	1898–1950	Also known as White City and Eweco	
Dells Crossroads	Wisconsin Dells	1986–1991	Became Dells Crossroads after Fort Dells closed in 1985.	
Fort Dells	Wisconsin Dells	1959–1985		
Kenosha's Lake Front Stadium	Kenosha	1936–1980		
Muskego Beach Amusement Park	Muskego	1861–1977	The park was named DandiLion Park from 1968–1977.	
Rainbow Falls Family Amusement Park	Plover	1988–2004		
Ravenna Park	Shorewood	1872–1916		
Riverview Park & Waterworld	Wisconsin Dells	1968–2011		
Storybook Gardens	Wisconsin Dells	1956–2011		
Thumb Fun Amusement Park	Fish Creek	1961–1998		
Waukesha Beach	Pewaukee	1893–1949		
