= Splashtown =

Splashtown is a name used by the following water parks in the United States:

- Splashtown at Darien Lake, a water park at Six Flags Darien Lake in Darien, New York now operating as Six Flags Hurricane Harbor
- SplashTown Houston, a water park in Spring, Texas now operating as Six Flags Hurricane Harbor SplashTown
- Splashtown San Antonio, a water park in San Antonio
