= Manhattan Beach (Denver) =

Former amusement park in Denver, Colorado

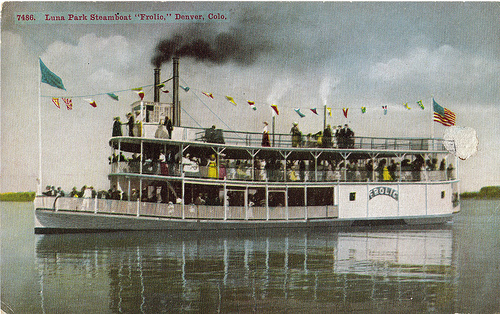
The steamboat Frolic entertained visitors at Manhattan Beach after the park was rebuilt (in 1908) as Luna Park.

Manhattan Beach was a former amusement park in Denver, Colorado, active from 1891 to 1914, and was the first amusement park created west of the Mississippi River. With funding support from Robert and Ernest Steinke, the park's founder, Adam Graff, built the park on the north shore of Sloan's Lake in Edgewater, Colorado. Open to the public for the first time on 27 June 1891, the park featured a roller coaster, a dance hall, a Ferris wheel, boating attractions, hot air balloon rides, wrestling bears, contortionists, aerial acts (including a human cannonball), a man who walked on ceilings, and exhibits displaying more than 40 species of animals. But its primary draw was Roger the Elephant (real name: Rajah), who was a popular children's ride. Visitors reached the park by streetcar, boats, and wagons.

While Manhattan Beach was a popular destination, mishaps, along with competition from nearby Elitch Gardens and White City (also known as Lakeside Amusement Park), marked its existence. In 1891, the park's main attraction, Roger the Elephant, became spooked by the sound of a hot-air balloon, bucking his passengers and crushing George W. Eaton, a five-year-old boy, in his frightened state.

In 1908, Manhattan Beach was damaged by fire; later that year, it was rebuilt and reopened as Luna Park.

It closed for the final time in 1914.
