= Earth Quest Adventures =

Proposed resort in Texas

EarthQuest Adventures
- Interactive map of EarthQuest Adventures
- Location: New Caney, Texas, United States
- Coordinates: 30.1656°N 95.1935°W
- Status: Cancelled
- Owner: Global EarthQuest Holdings (This entity is now bankrupt.)
- Operated by: Contour Entertainment
- Slogan: An Extraordinary Entertainment Resort Destination
- Website: www.earthquestadventures.com

EarthQuest Adventures was a planned resort located in New Caney, Texas, approximately 25 miles (40 km) north of Houston. Contour Entertainment is the resort's master planner and lead designer. The planned 1,600-acre (6.5 km^{2}) resort was to include a theme park as well as a water park, hotel, conference center, retail and office developments. The size of the theme park was reported to be 200 acres (0.81 km^{2}) on opening. The first phase was planned to begin in 2008.

The creator and founder of the park, dinosaur expert and author "Dino" Don Lessem, described it as a $500 million project with about 50 rides, including being inside a volcano, an ice cave, as well as coasters, and technologies that hadn't been used before. A billboard was set up around 2008 or 2009 on Phase 1, projecting an opening date of 2012 or 2013. On November 17, 2010, EarthQuest was redesigned to cut the cost from $500 million to $300 million and to add construction phases. These changes were being made to secure and satisfy the project's investors. According to the official Contour Entertainment website, the first phase of the project was to premiere in late 2012 or early 2013. In 2011, the company that owned the land filed for bankruptcy, and "no construction had begun" on the park. Contour Entertainment has not repurchased the land for the park that was lost in bankruptcy. It was to be repurchased by December 15, 2013, but this was cancelled and the project was cancelled.
