= Zero Gravity Amusement Park =

Former amusement park in Dallas, Texas

Amusement Management International DBA Zero Gravity Thrill Amusement Park
- Industry: Amusement park
- Founded: 1992
- Defunct: 2021
- Fate: Sold
- Headquarters: Dallas, Texas
- Key people: Alan Putter, Owner and Chief Executive Officer; Nick Bocksell, General Manager
- Products: Skycoaster (1992-2021), Skyscraper (2008-2021), Bungee Jump (1992-2021), Nothin But Net (1992-2021), Ejection Seat (Slingshot/Texas Blast Off) (1992-2021)

Zero Gravity Thrill Amusement Park was an amusement park in Dallas, Texas, with rides themed around freefall and simulated flying. Owned by Amusement Management International, Zero Gravity was in operation from 1992 until 2021.

== Rides ==
At the time of closing, the park operated five rides:

Bungee Jump
A seven-story Bungee tower, with a permanent 7 story platform designed especially for bungee jumping
Roller coaster
A 110 foot high Roller Coaster
Ejection Seat (Texas Blast Off)
Moves straight up 150 feet into the air, at a speed of zero to 70 mph in 1.2 seconds.
Nothin' But Net
Patrons bungee 100 feet into a net below from a 16-story tower.
Skyscraper
A towering propeller rotating at 60 mph, reaching 4G speed.

== History ==
Alan Putter formed Amusement Management International in 1992 in Dallas, Texas. The initial company names was Fun Adventures Inc. After doing operations with the original Skycoaster in 1993, installed permanent Skycoasters in Dallas, next to the Malibu Speed Zone site at I-35 and Walnut Hull, and in FIESTA Texas Theme park in San Antonio, Texas.

In 1992, the ejector seat ride of the Texas blastoff was installed. In 1999 AMI added two new rides to complement the Rollercoaster: vertical accelerator and two Skyscrapers.

In 2000, AMI was selected to be the Skycoaster operator for Six Flags Over Texas and in 2001 became the exclusive US operator of the Adrenaline Drop, an unattached freefall experience. The park was acquired by Amusement Management International in 2003.

In 2021, the landlord who owned the site of the park sold the land and the park closed.
