= Riverview Park (Baltimore) =

Former amusement park in Baltimore, Maryland, US

Coordinates: 39°15′37″N 76°32′38″W

Riverview Park was an early amusement park in Baltimore, Maryland, located off Broening Parkway in the area known as Point Breeze. The park began operating in 1890 and featured a roller coaster, water attractions, and live shows and concerts.

Future ragtime legends Eubie Blake and Noble Sissle met, and began their songwriting partnership, while working at Riverview Park.

The park closed in 1929, and the property was sold at auction to Western Electric, who constructed a plant on the site. The area was later redeveloped for other industrial use; no known artifacts are believed to survive.
