= Pierpoint Landing =

Entertainment complex in Long Beach, California

- Location: Long Beach, California, United States
- Status: Defunct
- Opened: 1948
- Closed: 1972

Pierpoint Landing was a sportfishing, eating and entertainment complex located at the end of Pier A in Long Beach, California, and what is now Pier F. In operation from 1948 to 1972, it was at one time the largest sportfishing operation in the world, attracting two million anglers annually.

The facility comprised several kiddie rides, a seal tank, souvenir shops, entertainments such as a spin art concession, and a 6,000-car parking lot. It housed restaurants and bars, as well as picnic tables where customers could consume food from on-site seafood vendors such as the Fish and Shrimp Shanty. The name Pierpoint Landing survives today as that of a sportfishing company located across the channel near the Long Beach Aquarium.

== Video ==
http://polb100.com/05/pierpoint-landing/
