= Allemarinda and James Wyer House =

Historic house in Minnesota, United States

- U.S. National Register of Historic Places
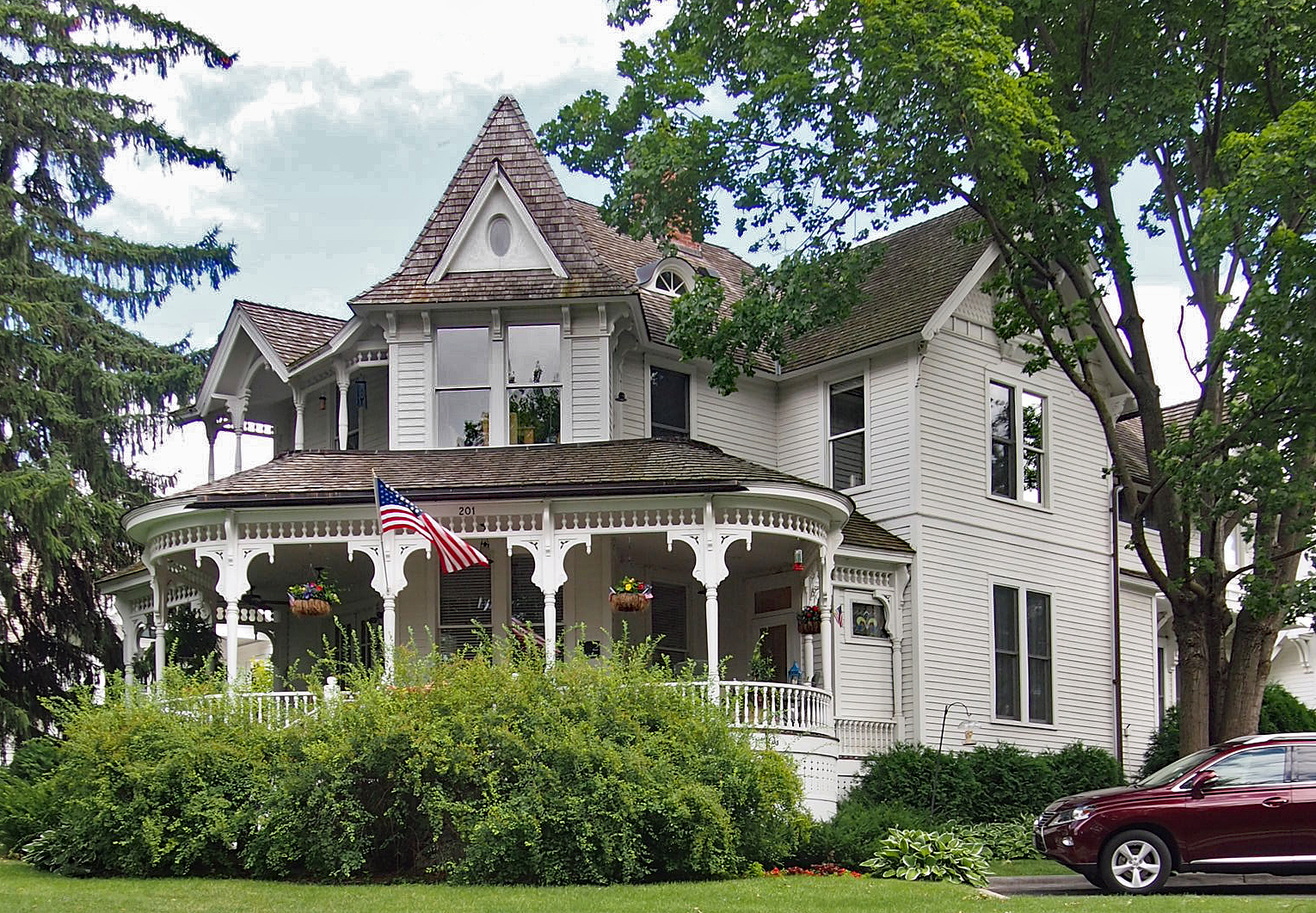
- The Wyer House viewed from the northwest

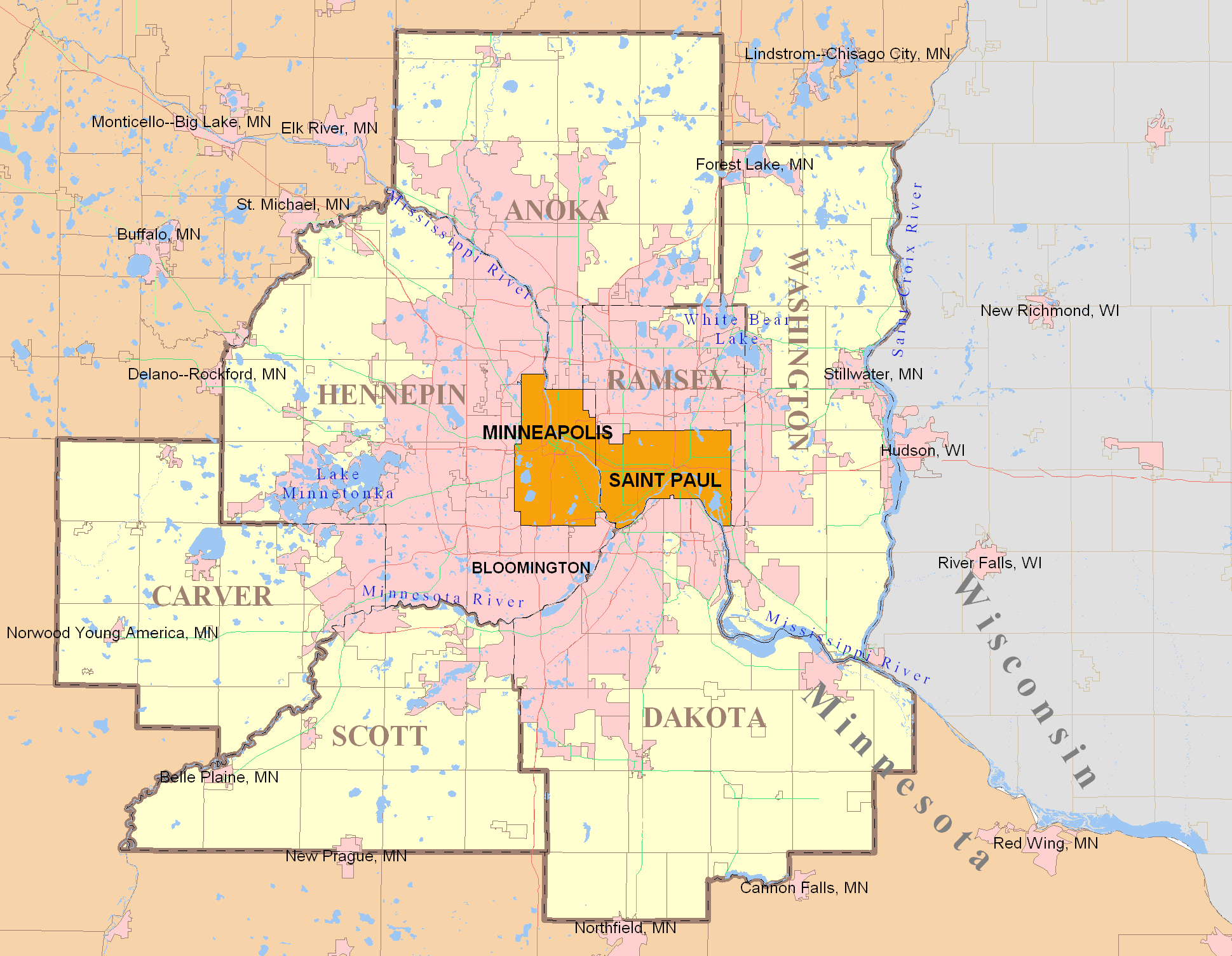
- Location within Minneapolis–Saint Paul Location within Minnesota Location within the United States
- Location: 201 Mill Street, Excelsior, Minnesota
- Coordinates: 44°54′6″N 93°33′45″W
- Area: 1.5 acres (0.61 ha)
- Built: c. 1880
- Architectural style: Stick/Eastlake
- NRHP reference No.: 77000735
- Added to NRHP: April 18, 1977

The Allemarinda and James Wyer House is a Victorian cottage beside Lake Minnetonka in Excelsior, Minnesota, United States. It was built in 1887 and added to the National Register of Historic Places in 1976. Its nomination form called it the largest and best preserved of Excelsior's Eastlake-style summer homes built around 1880. From 1925 through 1974, it served as the home for managers of the Excelsior Amusement Park.
