= Time Town =

Theme park

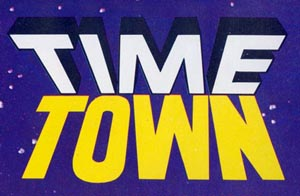

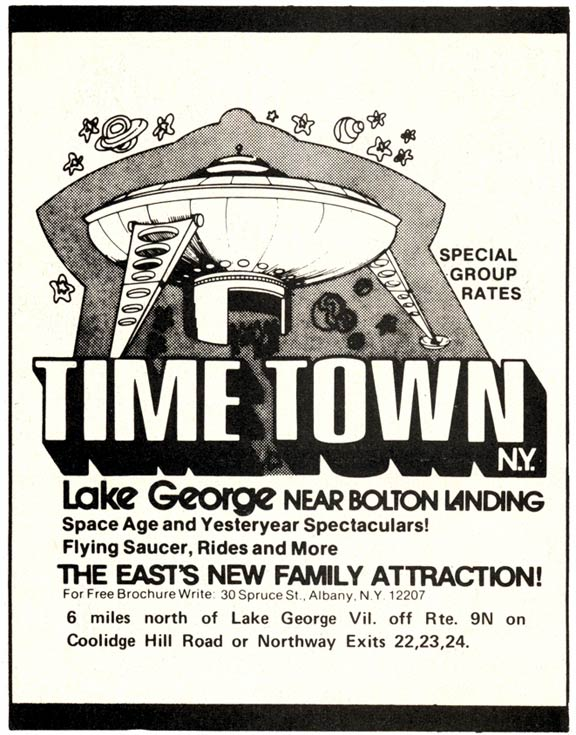
- Time Town advertisement in the Lake Georgia Guide, 1974
- Interactive map of Time Town
- Location: Bolton Landing, New York, United States
- Coordinates: 43.51751°N 73.69153°W
- Status: Defunct
- Opened: 1970
- Closed: 1981

Time Town was a theme park near Bolton Landing, New York, between Trout Lake and Lake George, along Coolidge Hill Road. The park, built by Ted Yund, opened in 1970 and closed after the summer of 1981. The park was demolished and its 44-acre site was sold for housing.

== Shows and attractions ==
- Telescope observatory
- Lion drinking fountain
- Magic shows
- Bumper cars
- Laser light shows
- Space Journey
- Bear Jamboree (animatronics band)
- SuperSlide
- Pioneer Valley Scenic Railroad
- Cave
- Merry-go-round
- Double astronaut statue
