= Harlem Park =

Former amusement park

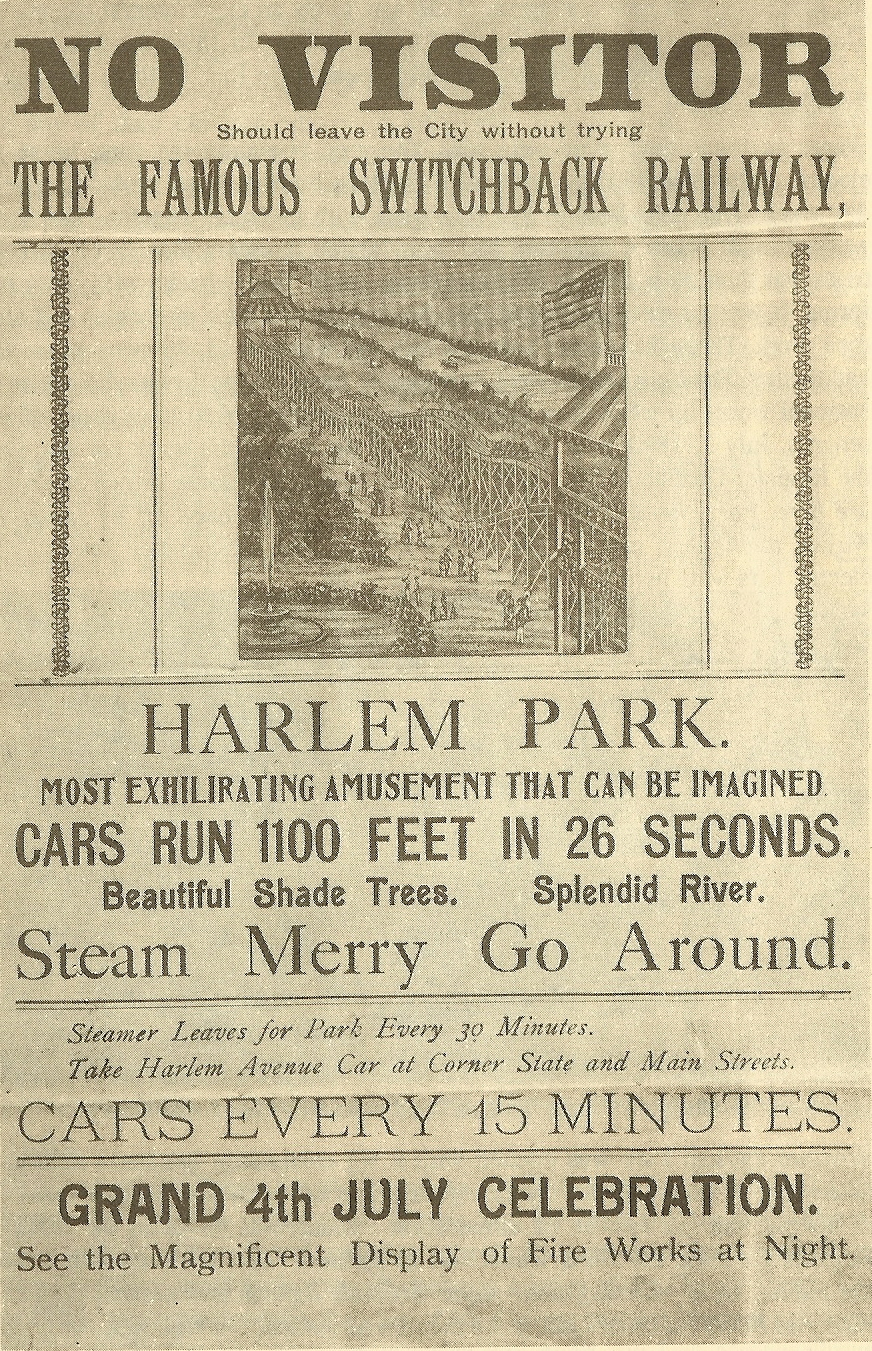
Harlem Park advertisement 1890s

Harlem Park was an amusement park and Chautauqua site in Rockford, Illinois that operated from 1891 to 1928. It was located on 47 wooded acres (0.2 km^{2}) east of Harlem Blvd. on the west bank of the Rock River on Rockford's north side. The main entrance was located between Harper and Brown Avenues.

== Rides ==
Harlem Park was known for its roller coaster, "The Famous Switchback Railway – Cars Run 1100 Feet in 26 Seconds". The park also featured: Steam Merry Go Around (later Electric Carousel), Three Way Figure Eight Scenic Railway, Shoot the Chutes, Giant Flying Circle Swing, Maze, The Old Mill (Tunnel of Love), Laughing Gallery Fun House, boat rentals, picnic grounds, a 5000-seat auditorium, a dance pavilion, a roller skating palace, a swimming pool (1922), and the midway bordered on both sides with such attractions as the ice cream parlor, lunch room, games of skill, and the rides.

== Chautauqua ==
Beginning in 1902, the Assembly of the Rockford Chautauqua met at Harlem Park for two weeks each summer, with attendance of over 80,000 annually. Participants could rent tents and stay overnight on site, enjoying educational and entertainment programs during the day and evening. Lecturers included William Jennings Bryan, "Fighting Bob" La Follette and Jane Addams.

== Transportation ==
The Rockford Street Railway Company developed Harlem Park as a terminus for its streetcar line serving the north side of the city. A car barn stood near the park between Harlem Blvd. and Clinton Street on the south side of Brown Ave. During the summer, cars departed every 15 minutes from the center of town, bound for the park. The park was also served by two steamboats running two miles upstream from the center of town and by an electric ferry bringing park patrons across the river.

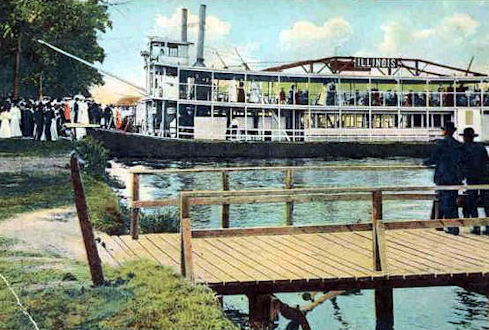
Steamboat Illinois at Harlem Park 1910

== Demise ==
At the close of the 1928 summer season the park was closed, and some of the attractions were moved to Central Park (1921–1942) on the west edge of the city. In preparation for a residential subdivision, a 2,000-foot seawall was built on the river bank and the land behind it was built up by as much as six feet with material dredged from the river. The Wall Street crash of 1929 brought the project to a standstill and it was 1948 before the first home was built in the Rock Terrace subdivision.
