= Brigantine Castle =

Defunct haunted house attraction in Brigantine, New Jersey

- Brigantine Castle Pier in the 1970s
- Location: Brigantine, New Jersey, USA
- Status: Defunct
- Opened: 1976
- Closed: 1984

Brigantine Castle was a popular funhouse and haunted house attraction by the beach in Brigantine, New Jersey. It was originally located at the corner of 14th Street and Brigantine Avenue.

Constructed in 1976, it drew millions of visitors annually until it was damaged in 1982 in a storm. Facing declining attendance and a $500,000 repair bill, it was closed in 1984. Carmen Ricci, the owner, sold it in 1987 for $1 million, and it burned to the ground later that year just as demolition was slated to begin.
