= Wacky Waters Adventure Park =

Water park in Davenport, Iowa

Coordinates: 41.604°N 90.630°W

Wacky Waters Adventure Park was a water park located in Davenport, Iowa that was in operation from 1984 to 2007. In February 2007, it was announced that Wacky Waters has closed and the property has been sold to the Eastern Iowa Community College District, which will operate The Midwest Center For Safety And Rescue Training on the property, a training facility for fire departments.

In 1986, a couple received national attention by having their marriage ceremony atop the park's "Daredevil" water slide. After exchanging vows, they kissed each other while sliding down the large slide.

== Former Attractions ==
Before the park closed, it featured numerous attractions including:

- Bumper boats
- Kids' Pirate Ship
- L'il Squirt Children's Slide
- Extreme Slide called the Bonsai
- Two Body Slides, Daredevil & Thunderbolt
- The Wave Pool
- Pond with Diving Boards and Zip Lines
- Go Carts
- Miniature Golf
