= Flint Park =

Former theme park in Flint, Michigan, USA

Coordinates: 43.056510°N 83.719528°W

Flint Park was a theme park located in the city of Flint, Michigan, USA. The park was located next to Flint Park Lake (also known as Devil's Lake) on the north side of the city. The park, settled on 40 acres of land next to the 19-acre (77,000 m^{2}) lake, opened on May 30, 1921 and closed down in 1961. The amusement park was torn down in late 1963 or early 1964.

== History ==
On August 26, 1919, a plan for the park was brought before the city of Flint by the Flint Park & Amusement Co. The proposal was that a large amusement park and recreational area would be built on 40 acres (160,000 m^{2}) of the Matthew Davison farm beside Flint Park Lake near Stewart Avenue and Dupont Street. The budget for it was for more than $250,000. Some of the features proposed were a dance hall, an area for festivals and sports, a place for opera concerts, a skating rink, and a playground for children. The proposal stated that the park was to be absolutely of high class in its entertainments and no questionable amusements would be permitted.

The plan was approved by the city and in 1921 the park opened after the extension of the Stewart Avenue streetcar line. Flint Park was opened up under the management of E.E. Berger.

A fire destroyed a portion of the concession stands and damaged two of the rides in July during the first season, but the park was still successful. For many seasons, new rides and recreational areas were appearing. A lagoon was added to the lake for boaters and there was an area added for swimming. In 1924, picnic areas and a baseball diamond were added.

There were a couple deaths and some injuries during the park's time. A rider was killed while standing up on the roller coaster. The other fatality was due to someone falling down the stairs of the beer garden. A second fire occurred in 1941.

The deadly tornado that hit Flint in 1953 did not leave Flint Park unscathed either. The roller coaster needed to be repaired after it was badly damaged by the winds from the tornado. The roller coaster was repaired by Pat Anger, who maintained Flint Park after moving to the area in 1938 with his family. He rebuilt the first hill and gave it more height.

By the late fifties, even with more attractions added and ownership was now in the hands of S.S. Gorne, vandalism started to increase. On March 31, 1961, the decision to not reopen was made public by the owners. Flint Park, which operated for nearly 40 years, was eventually demolished.

== List of Rides ==
- Roller Coaster called the Jack Rabbit
- The Whip
- Old Mill Water Ride
- Ferris wheel
- Dodgem Bumper Cars
- Octopus
- Mercury Flyer Miniature Train
- Live Pony Merry-Go-Round
- Miniature Train Ride
- Traver Tumble-Bug

== List of Shows ==
- Howdy Wilcox (musician)
- Nick and his Cornhuskers (musician)
- Los Aeros Acrobatics Group
- Ella Fitzgerald
- World's Largest Sideshow
- Rollercapades
