= Santafair =

Former amusement park in Federal Way, Washington

Coordinates: 47.3228°N 122.3144°W

Santafair (Later promoted as Touray or Hippadrome Concerts and Dances)
- Interactive map of Santafair (Later promoted as Touray or Hippadrome Concerts and Dances)
- Location: Federal Way, Washington, USA
- Opened: 1960s
- Closed: 1970s

Santafair was an amusement park located on the grounds of the old Federal Shopping Way shopping center in Federal Way, Washington that was active in the 1960s and 1970s.

It was a relatively small park, but had dozens of attractions (a 1963 promotional magazine listed 75 individual attractions, spread out in 14 themed areas). Among the features were historical exhibits, futuristic space-themed areas, rides, sports and games. It also featured a roller coaster called the Stratoboggan, which was a major draw.

In 1963, the Habsburg Hippodrome (also known in later years as the Touray Ballroom) opened at Santafair. This 700 seat venue played host to numerous acts during the 1960s, including big band performances, local rockers, and even a concert by Ricky Nelson on January 30, 1970. The building was designed as a replica of the 3rd Century hippodrome in Constantinople. The train ride built by Arrow Development is now located in Paso Robles California

== See also ==
- List of abandoned amusement parks
