= Adventure River =

Defunct water park

- Interactive map of Adventure River
- Location: Memphis, Tennessee, United States
- Coordinates: 35°10′48″N 89°49′56″W
- Owner: WWW Park Inc.
- Opened: 1985
- Closed: 1998
- Previous names: Wild Water & Wheels
- Operating season: Memorial Day to Labor Day
- Status: Defunct[[]]
- Pools: A single pool
- Water slides: 12 water slides

Adventure River was a water park located in Memphis, Tennessee. It opened in 1985 and closed in 1998. Adventure River was located just northeast of the I-40 and Whitten Road junction.

== History ==
The park, which had become "Wild Water and Wheels" in its later years with the addition of go-carts, closed in September 1998 due to decreasing attendance, rising insurance costs, and the rise in property value in the area.

Much of the land formerly housing the park is now used as an industrial park which houses regional offices for Johnson Controls, Terminix, Burger King, and TruGreen among others.

== Attractions ==
The park included a beach, a wave pool, concession stands, and several water slides. The most well known slide was named Geronimo. It featured live music concerts, including many local musicians and "dive in movies", which patrons could watch from the wave pool. Other attractions included several small rides in a kiddie area.
