= Springlake Amusement Park =

Former amusement park in Oklahoma City, Oklahoma, US

- Interactive map of Springlake Amusement Park
- Location: 1900 Springlake Drive, Oklahoma City, Oklahoma, U.S.
- Coordinates: 35°30′47″N 97°28′43″W
- Status: Defunct
- Opened: 1924
- Closed: 1981
- Owner: Roy Staton

Springlake Amusement Park was an amusement park in Oklahoma City, Oklahoma. It was originally established in 1922 (some sources say 1924) by Roy Staton about six years after his spring-fed pond at NE 40th and Eastern (now Martin Luther King Blvd) had been open to swimmers and picnickers. Staton expanded the park with the addition of many rides acquired from the defunct Belle Isle Park and construction of a ballroom.

In 1929 he added the Big Dipper roller coaster, which would be a fixture in the park for the next 50 years. Admission was free and the rides and pool were pay-as-you-go, so visitors could picnic by the lake at no cost until the 1960s when pay one price came into being.

The park was popular throughout the 1950s and 1960s and it attracted many of the top entertainers of the era, including Johnny Cash, Jerry Lee Lewis, The Righteous Brothers, Roy Acuff, Conway Twitty and The Beach Boys. A race riot in 1971, a change in ownership to Thomas Traveling Shows, poor maintenance, a devastating fire in the arcade and in the owner's nearby home led to the park's demise. A large scale unadvertised garage sale in the spring of 1981 began the end of this popular city attraction. All of the rides, buildings, and memorabilia were offered for sale, some going as far away as Lima, Peru. What remained, huge electric motors from the merry go round and other rides, boxes of paper cups and rolls of tickets, advertising, and an assortment of old bumper cars and coaster cars were buried on site.

The property was purchased in mid 1981 by the Oklahoma City Vo-Tech Board and the Metro Technology Center was constructed on the site. Of the original park structures, only the amphitheater remains; a car from the Big Dipper and many photos of the park are on display at Metro Tech.
