= Splashtown San Antonio =

Former water park in San Antonio, Texas

- Location: San Antonio, Texas, United States
- Coordinates: 29.447°N 98.426°W
- Owner: Chrismari Inc.
- Opened: 1985
- Closed: September 11, 2021
- Previous names: Water Park USA
- Operating season: May–September
- Area: 20 acres (8.1 ha)

Splashtown San Antonio was a water park located in San Antonio, Texas, United States. Its most recent name was "Splashtown USA".

The park opened in 1985 as Water Park USA. It was sold to Wave Management, its second owner, in 1989. Its third owner since it opened was Chrismari Inc. of San Antonio. Chrismari Inc. bought it in 1991 and formed Surf San Antonio Inc. to manage the property, with Keith D. Kinney serving as president and general manager. International Theme Park Services Inc. announced in 2005 that it was looking for a buyer for it. During 2006, Mr. Kinney bought out the other shareholders' interest in the property and became the sole owner.

Located on 20 acres (8.1 ha) in the city's inner northeast side, the park featured a half-million-gallon wave pool, a quarter-mile-long lazy river, 40 water slides and tube rides (including 18 for guests under 48 inches (120 cm) tall), an activity pool with lily pads and balance logs, water and beach volleyball, and basketball.

In October 2021, it was announced that Splashtown San Antonio would close to make way for a car dealership.
