= Luna Park, Alexandria =

Trolley park in Virginia, US (1906–1915)

Coordinates: 38°50′40″N 77°03′20″W

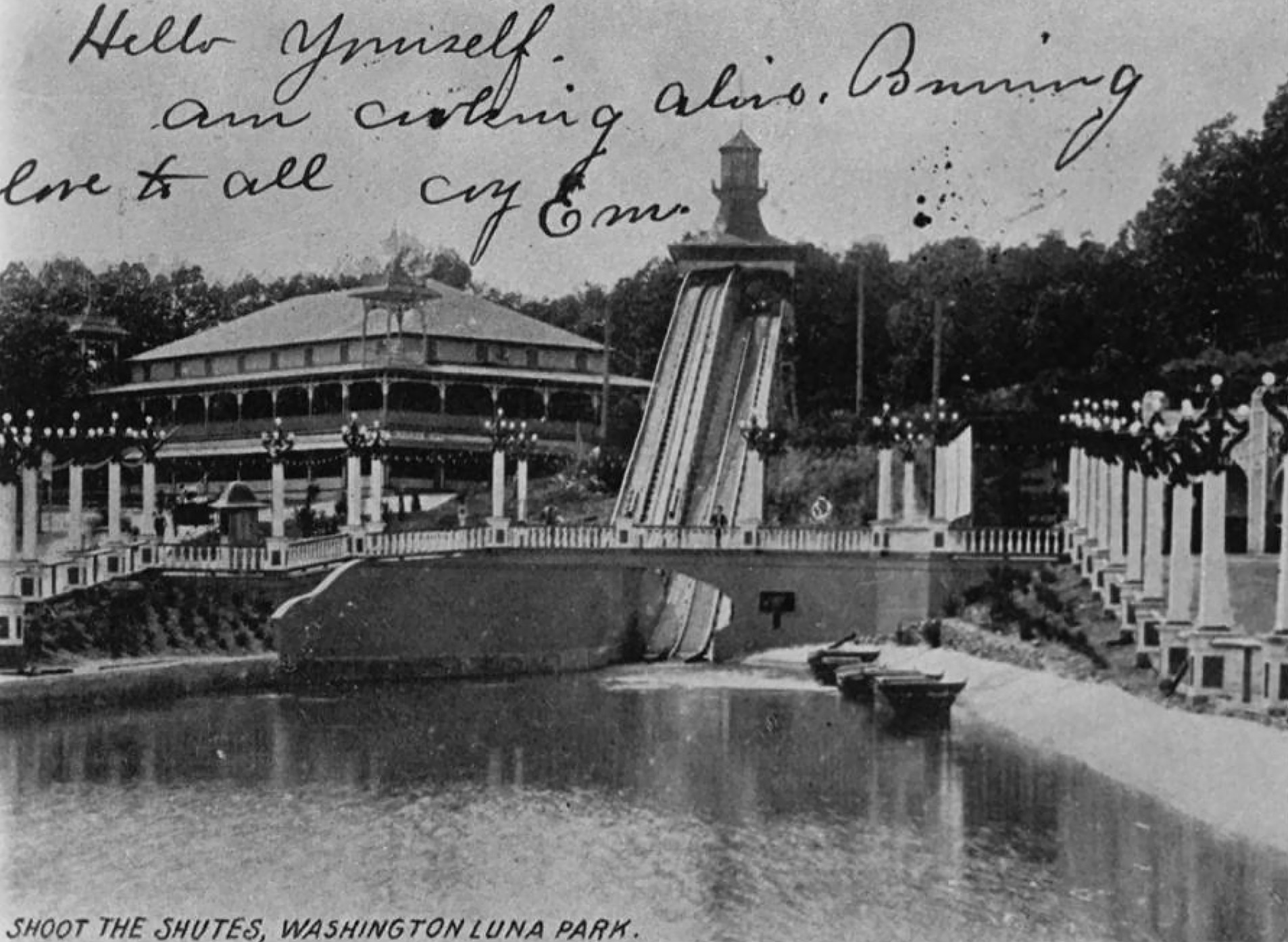
Postcard advertising the "Shoot the Chutes" ride at Luna Park

Luna Park (also known as Washington Luna Park and Luna Park Washington D.C.) was a trolley park in Alexandria County, Virginia (now Arlington County) that operated between 1906 and 1915. The amusement park was built for $500,000 in just three months by the Washington, Alexandria, and Mount Vernon Electric Railway (later the Washington-Virginia Railway), which was seeking to attract new businesses along its line after nearby racing and gambling establishments closed.

Designed by prominent amusement-park designer Frederick Ingersoll, Luna Park opened to the public in May 1906. It offered a variety of rides, performances, music, picnic grounds, and sports fields. While it was briefly popular, the park was never a financial success, and visitors dwindled over the years. A fire destroyed the roller coaster in 1915, and the park closed soon after. Many of the attractions were disassembled in 1918, though remains of the park persisted at the site for decades afterwards. Part of the former Luna Park is now occupied by Arlington County's sewage treatment facility.

== Development ==
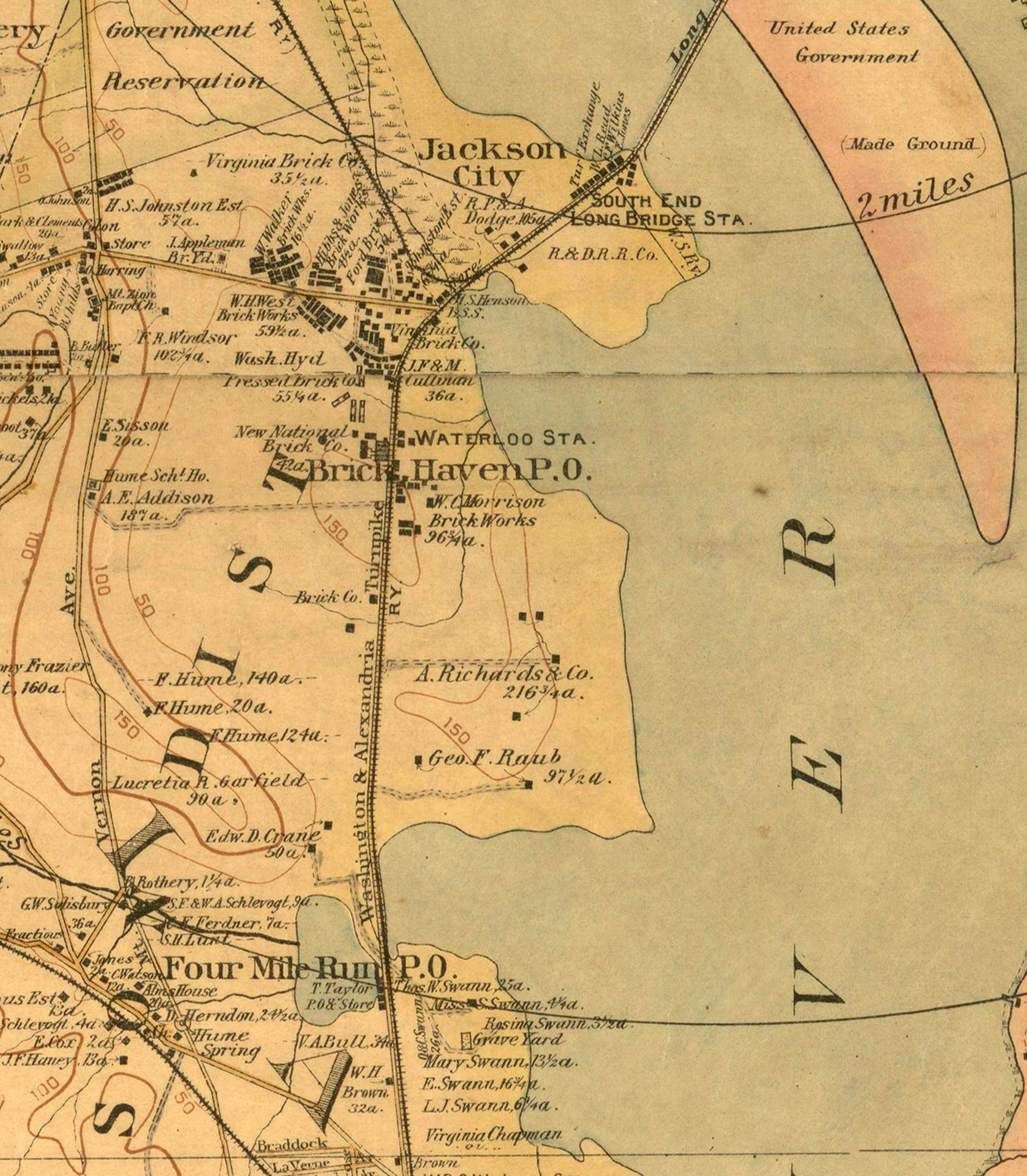
Alexandria, 1894. Jackson City is at center top; the site that would be developed into Luna Park is the 50-acre plot of Edw. D. Crane, just north of Four Mile Run.

In the mid-19th century, the part of Alexandria County, Virginia, across from Washington, D.C., near Long Bridge was dubbed Jackson City by developers who envisioned an industrial hub. Instead, the area filled with gambling dens and racetracks after post-Civil War anti-gambling crackdowns in New Jersey and Washington, D.C. Though the Virginia Assembly banned most forms of gambling in 1892, the laws remained unenforced in Jackson City, which became known as the "Monte Carlo of the East".

In 1903, Crandal Mackey was elected Alexandria County Attorney General on a progressive anti-corruption platform. Mackey ordered law enforcement to clear out the gambling resorts. After the police did nothing for several months, Mackey assembled, deputized, and armed 30 residents who marched through Jackson City, smashing up the gambling dens they found. This and other raids shuttered the gambling industry in the area.

The closures, particularly of St. Asaph Racetrack, prompted the Washington, Alexandria, and Mount Vernon Railway to seek a new way to attract passengers. To that end, they hired Frederick Ingersoll to design and operate Luna Park. Ingersoll had built some 40 other such parks; in 1905 and 1906 alone, these included Indianola Park in Columbus, Ohio; Rocky Glen Park near Moosic, Pennsylvania; and Luna Parks in Pittsburgh, Cleveland, and Scranton.

The railroad company chartered a subsidiary, Washington Luna Park Company, on December 29, 1905. This company secured a park site: about 40 acres (16 ha) (Note: Some sources give the total acreage of the park site up to 54 acres.) on an old farm north of Four Mile Run and west of the Alexandria Canal and adjacent roadway and trolley line. Before the Civil War, the area was known as "Swallow Hill" and later "The Wild Man's Cave" after the hermit who lived there for years. The area was already a popular picnic spot for residents. The park was built in a matter of months. In late January, laborers began grading the site, moving more than 60,000 cubic yards of earth. Workers discovered a series of manmade subterranean rooms on the site, including a library, which The Washington Post reported as the work of an unknown person, "evidently an eccentric." Interest from committees and clubs who wanted to use the new park for picnics and outings led to changes in the park's plans, and the construction of a larger picnic grove with a running track and partially enclosed athletic field. In March, the builders invited representatives of lodges and social clubs to tour the park to attract their business, and in September the company offered common stock for shares in the completed park. The cost of construction was reported as $350,000, but would ultimately rise to about $500,000 (equivalent to $17,917,000 in 2025), with $4,000 for paint alone. A "Luna Park Special" spur line connected the park to the trolley system, making it a 12-minute rail trip from Washington, D.C. The Railway spent $200,000 to build the line and upgrade the nearby power house to handle Luna Park's artificial lighting. Water was supplied by a concrete reservoir built near Fort Scott on a hill. The park was initially managed by George E. Gill, with the company and most of its stock controlled by John W. Pittock.

== Operation ==
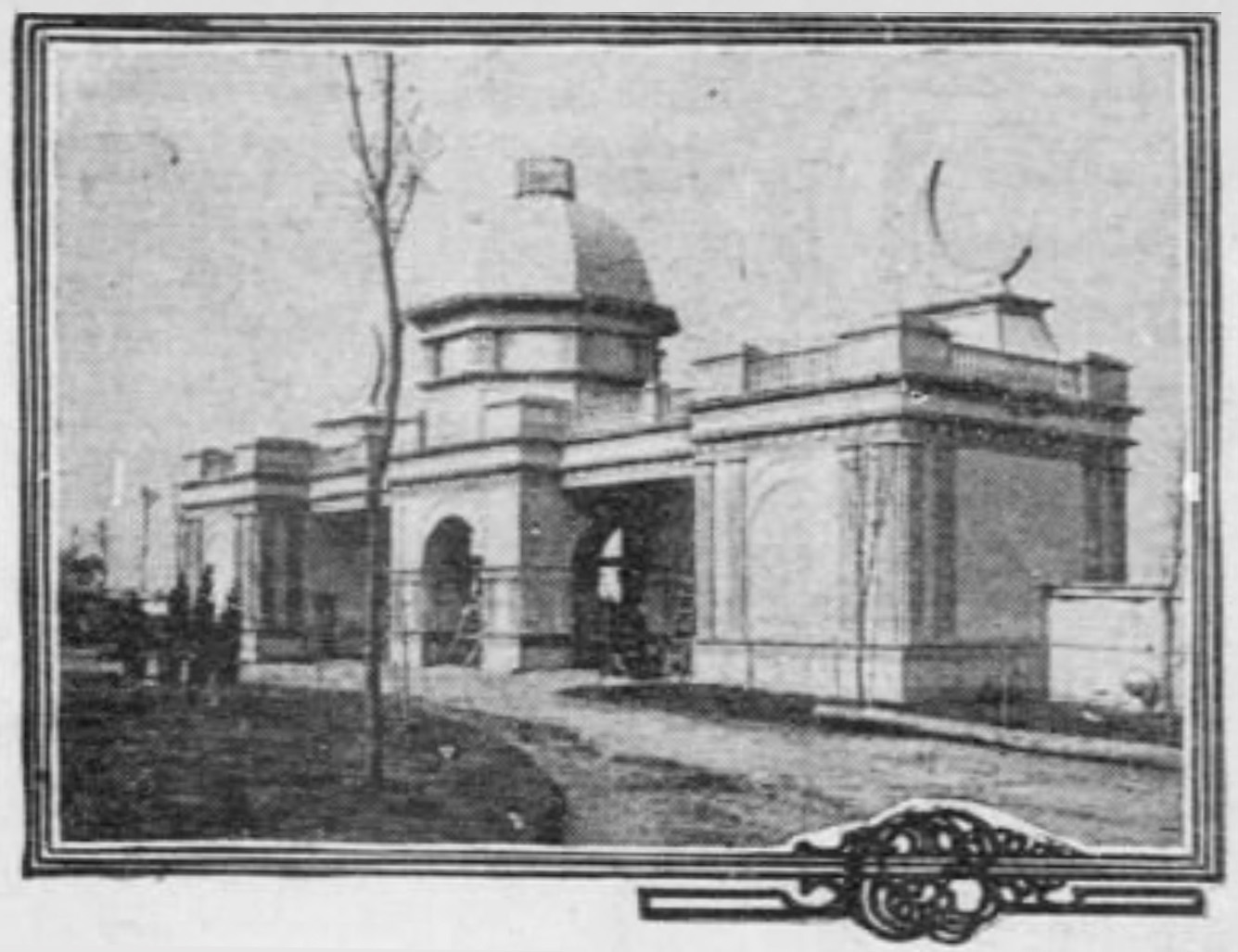
Main entrance gates before opening, May 1906. The side of the gate housed offices and a telegraph and telephone booth.

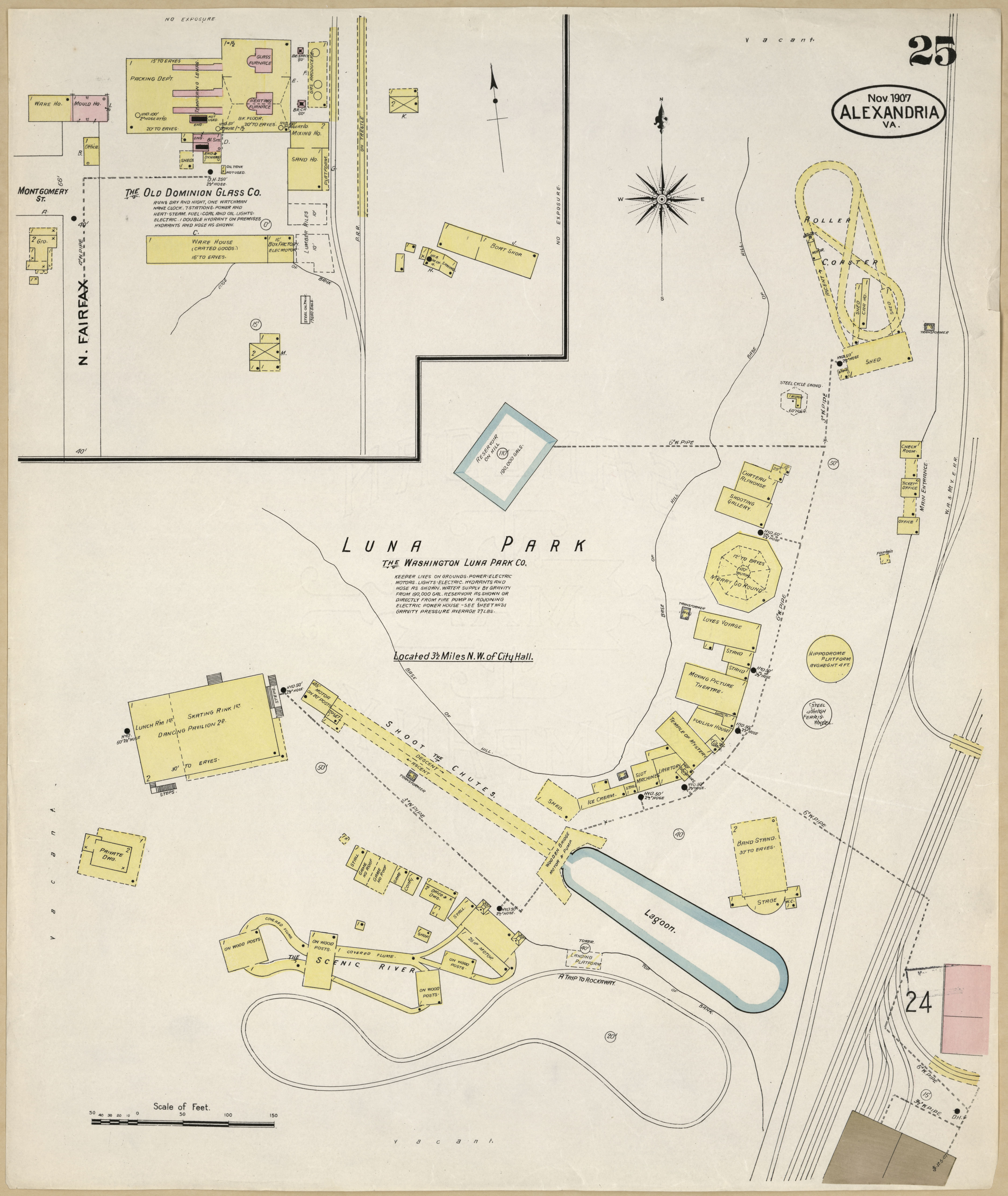
A Sanborn map of Luna Park, November 1907. The entrance and rail lines are to the right edge, with the rollercoaster at the top and attractions sprawling south.

The park opened at 7 p.m. on May 28, 1906. The railway ordered 20 streetcars to service the route to the park every three minutes. The opening day program included musicians, dancers, jugglers, "comedy sheep", and stage actor John W. Ransome doing his impersonation of William Jennings Bryan. Some parts of the park, including a circle swing ride and a scenic river, were not yet complete. The park hosted over 30,000 visitors on Memorial Day. The Washington Post attributed to the happy and orderly crowds to good management and the park's prohibition on alcohol.

The entrance was topped by an Egyptian-styled tower with a searchlight. The main concourse, called "The Great Trail", featured concessions and attractions and was illuminated at night with 80,000 electric lights. Exhibits were housed in buildings displaying different architecture styles including Japanese, Moorish, Gothic, and Byzantine. The park featured throwing games, figure eight roller coaster, and a shoot-the-chutes dropping 150 feet to the lagoon. The scenic river ride wound 2,200 feet through the park and featured ten "scene houses" featuring themes such as the Arctic, tropics, and Dante's Inferno. Non-ride attractions included a ballroom, mutoscope parlor, casino, restaurants, a bandstand with 2,000 free seats, picnic facilities for 3,000 people, and an 8,000-seat arena to accommodate circuses, aerialists, and equestrian acts. A hospital provided free medical services to guests. In its opening season, the park featured a "photograph garage" where people could pose with the newfangled automobile and illusion shows. A Luna Park brochure highlighted that visitors would not find low-brow "fat women, tattooed freaks or other distasteful features of the tented shows", while Billboard described the park in 1908 as having "big dumb [mute] acts".

Local organizations, church, and clubs would have picnics and events at the park. In addition to concerts and plays, the Park also hosted air shows, such as A. Roy Knabenshue and Lincoln Beachey in 1906. Fireworks shows and special events rounded out the offerings.

The park featured special features rented from Coney Island in New York, such as a diving horse and trained elephants. On the morning of August 21, 1906, four elephants from one such traveling show, Barlow's Elephants, escaped. Attempts to round them up were frustrated by the elephants stampeding after being frightened by local dogs. The escape caused a stir in the region, and the elephants left a trail of devastation. After failing to capture the elephants after a day of searching, Barlow offered a $500 bounty for the capture of any of the escapees. One was captured on the second day of the hunt, but subsequently broke loose again. The showman Pawnee Bill, who was traveling through the region, was asked to help corral two others. The final elephant, who had been beaten by an emboldened posse, was located and captured on August 26. The elephants had wandered as far as Baileys Crossroads and 20 miles south of Alexandria. Suggested causes of the elephants' stampede ranged from the thunder and lightning of a violent storm the night before the escape, to a deliberate release to garner publicity.

While the park's reservoir failed in July 1906 after heavy rains, the park was not damaged. Luna Park finished its first season in October with a series of events including a daredevil bicycle act and trapeze performance. It reopened in May 1907, featuring improvements including a skating rink and "resting room" for female patrons. The park was updated with new attractions over the following years, including an airship ride called "A Trip to the Moon".

== Closure ==
While the park enjoyed initial popularity, it was never a profitable endeavor, and the electric railway made more money from train operations than the park itself. Washingtonians patronized closer resorts and parks instead, and the park saw a slow decline in attendance.

In the early afternoon of April 15, 1915, a fire destroyed the park's signature roller coaster. Dry weather had caused fires across the region, and the coaster fire may have started from burning brush in the neighboring woods. Prevailing winds and the coaster's relatively isolated location spared the rest of the park. But the disaster, on top of already precarious finances, forced the park to go out of business.

The site idled for years. Nineteen acres of the park site were listed for auction in 1917. The site's attractions were dismantled in early 1918, with some slated for reuse at other parks. In 1919, The Washington Herald reported that New York businessmen were contemplating buying and refurbishing the park, but the park never reopened. Later that year, reports said the site was occupied by woods and brush.

The entrance gates and a few buildings survived for decades, and traces of the park were evident as late as 1993. The Arlington County sewage treatment facility now covers part of the park's site near the intersection of South Glebe Road and Jefferson Davis Highway (U.S. Route 1).
