= Riverside Amusement Park (Indianapolis) =

Amusement park in Indiana, US, 1903–1970

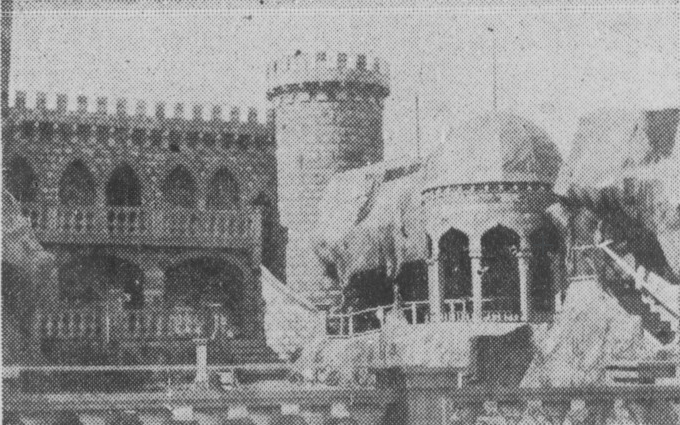
- The Funland section of Riverside Amusement Park in 1928
- Interactive map of Riverside Amusement Park
- Location: Indianapolis, Indiana, US
- Coordinates: 39°48′40″N 86°11′32″W
- Status: Defunct
- Opened: May 1904
- Closed: 1970

Riverside Amusement Park was an amusement park in Indianapolis, Indiana, US from 1903 to 1970. Originating as a joint venture between engineer/amusement park developer Frederick Ingersoll and Indianapolis businessmen J. Clyde Power, Albert Lieber, Bert Fiebleman, and Emmett Johnson, the park was built by Ingersoll's Pittsburgh Construction Company adjacent to Riverside City Park at West 30th Street between White River and the Central Canal in the Riverside subdivision of Indianapolis.

== History ==
=== Formation and early years ===
On 6 January 1903, incorporation papers were filed for Riverside Amusement Company with the State of Indiana. The list of company directors included William Jineson (of Charleroi, Pennsylvania), Elmore E. Gregg and Frederick Ingersoll (both of Pittsburgh, Pennsylvania), J. Clyde Power and Albert Leiber (both of Indianapolis). The following May, the park opened and was an immediate success. One of Ingersoll's signature figure 8 roller coasters was one of several attractions pulling in the crowds in the park's early days; another was a looking-glass maze. The park's first manager, Frank P. Thomas Sr., decided not to charge an admission fee for entry onto the grounds, opting to charge the patrons by the individual ride (5 cents for the "double-eight tobaggan railway", for example).

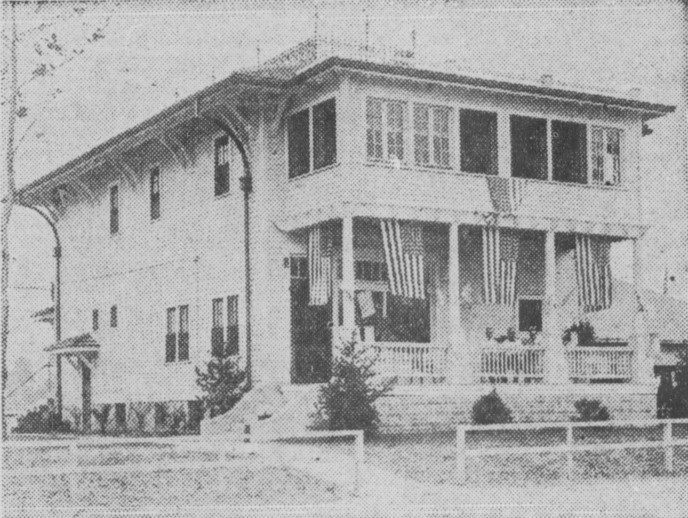
The administrative building of Riverside Amusement Park in 1928.

Despite Ingersoll's turning his attention away from Riverside Amusement Park and toward his plans for Rocky Glen Park and Indianola Park (with his Luna Parks only two years into the future), Power (himself an engineer) and the directors of the Riverside Amusement Company quickly added an Old Mill ride in which boats were ridden through a darkened tunnel into a replica of a working flour mill. In 1906, J.S. Sandy became the new manager and hired 120 men to expand and update the park. Live entertainment added to the throngs as Sandy arranged for increased streetcar service into the park. On 6 May 1906, opening day for the park's fourth season, approximately 30,000 people visited the park (one-fifth the population of Indianapolis at the time), according to Sandy. Two weeks later, a second competing amusement park, Wonderland, opened its gates to the public. By the end of the year another, White City, opened along the White River, north of the Indianapolis city limit. The three-way rivalry involving Riverside Amusement Park, Wonderland, and White City intensified over the next two years (White City was destroyed by fire 26 June 1908; Wonderland met the same fate three years later).

Attractions and rides were being added in an increasing rate: an "aerial swing", a Japanese bowling alley, a "Gee Whiz", an electric carousel, a miniature railway, various arcade and carnival games... and a massive (350 feet long) shoot-the-chutes ride. Each new ride was bedecked with lighting similar to that of the Luna Parks (not only of Coney Island but also Ingersoll's burgeoning empire in Cleveland and Pittsburgh). Riverside Amusement Park also benefitted from the increased popularity of its skating rink, dancing pavilion, canoes, and rowboats—each generating revenues as the park's new rivals spent thousands of dollars with new attractions and rides. The last notable addition under the aegis of J.S. Sandy (as mechanical rides were rapidly declining in popularity) was the bathing beach (with a six-story-tall diving tower), opened in 1910.

=== Ownership change ===
In 1919, the park had new ownership. Lewis Coleman, a lawyer who provided legal advice to the Riverside Amusement Company and took payment in the form of company stock, organized the Riverside Exhibition Company and gained control of the park. With Coleman as president, the park added two large roller coasters (The Flash and The Thriller), installed Dodgem cars (a forerunner of today's bumper cars), replaced the miniature railroad with a longer one, expanded the dancing pavilion and converted it into a roller skating rink, and housed the games and concessions in new concrete buildings. The additional investments reversed the park's trend in declining attendance over the previous decade (this trend was mirrored nationally as amusement park after amusement park ceased to exist after the initial first-decade-of-the-new-century boom).

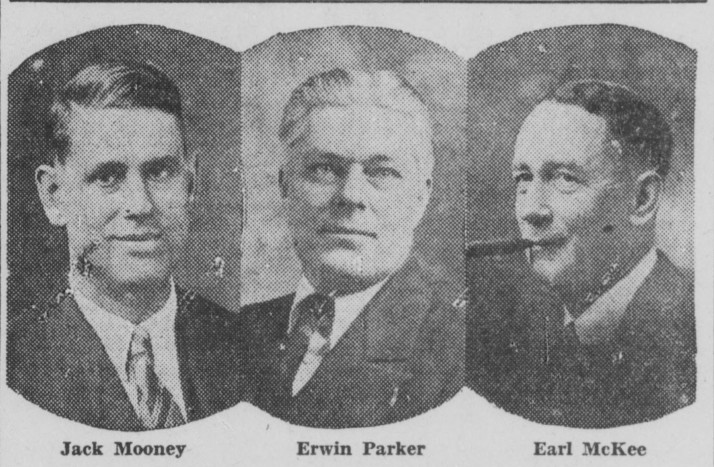
Managers of Riverside Amusement Park in 1928: Assistant Manager Jack Mooney, Manager Erwin Parker, and Publicity Director Earl McKee.

Lewis also instituted a "whites only" policy in the park, permitting African Americans access to the park only on designated days. It would remain in effect for almost 50 years.

In 1939, control of the park was passed from Lewis Coleman to his son, John. The younger Coleman kept the park alive through the World War II years by sponsoring wartime relief programs to military families and emphasizing patriotism in his park's publicity.

Riverside Amusement Park's attendance increased after the end of World War II and the return of the region's troops to their home. The residents of Indianapolis gained in mobility (due to greater availability of motor transportation) and in leisure activity. An estimated one million people visited the park's midway and skating rink in 1952. By the end of the decade, Coleman added new attractions and rides, including one that became popular in the newly opened Disneyland, an automobile turnpike ride. Ironically, theme parks like Disneyland and the private automobile also proved to be two major contributors to the demise of the park less than two decades later.

=== Demise of the park ===
The decade of the 1960s was not a kind one for Riverside Amusement Park, which was losing attendance for the first time since the end of World War II. By the time John Coleman lifted the "whites only" policy (in response to a series of protests organized by the NAACP Youth Council in 1963), the park was losing $30,000 a year.

Increased cost of insurance, maintenance, and new rides, coupled with increased competition from the emerging theme parks, were cited by Coleman as the park closed for the last time at the end of the 1970 season. Meyer Cohen bought the park in 1976, intending to reopen it on a smaller scale. The site was linked to an outbreak of histoplasmosis in 1976, the largest to that date in the United States, causing Cohen to put the site up for sale.

All the rides were sold or demolished by 1978. The land lay undisturbed for more than two decades, until the construction of the Rivers Edge subdivision in the early 2000s.
