= White City (Indianapolis) =

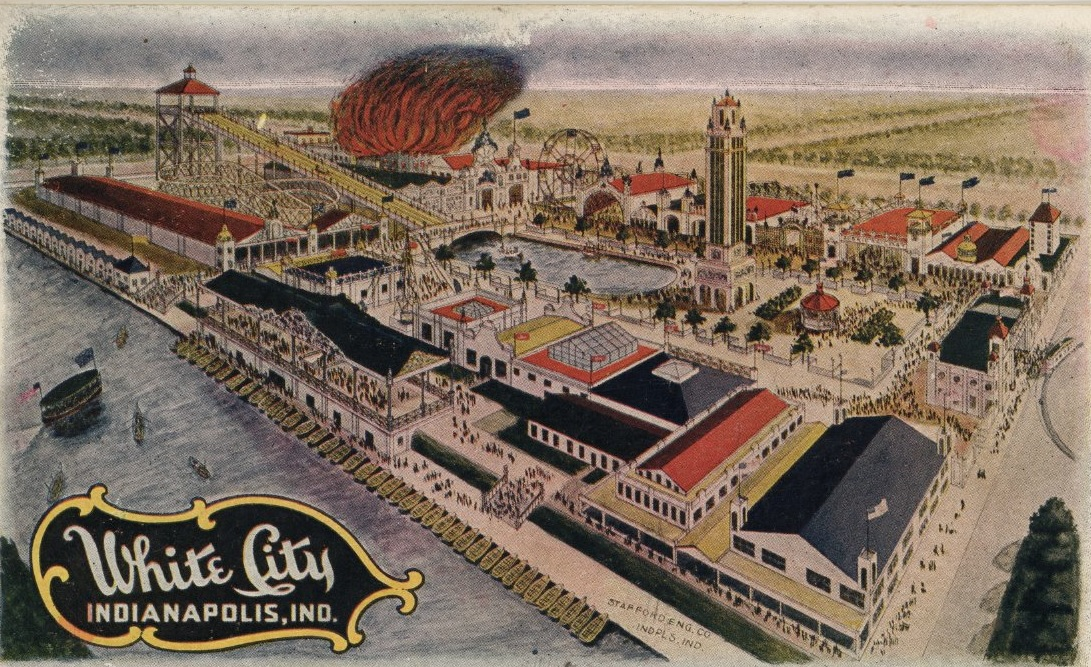
- Postcard showing aerial view of the park
- Location: Broad Ripple Park, Indianapolis, Indiana, US
- Status: Defunct
- Opened: May 26, 1906
- Closed: June 26, 1908

White City (also known as White City Amusement Park) was an amusement park in Indianapolis, Indiana, in what is now Broad Ripple Park that was in operation from May 26, 1906, until June 26, 1908. The trolley park was constructed and owned by the Broad Ripple Transit Company. Similar to nearby rivals Riverside Amusement Park and Wonderland, White City was inspired by an exhibit in the 1893 World's Columbian Exposition in Chicago. Although the park's grand opening was immensely successful, White City's existence was the briefest of the three, having been open for two and one-half seasons before burning to the ground. Throughout the park's existence, advertisements touted White City as "the amusement park that satisfied".

== Origin and grand opening ==
White City arose during the national wave of increasing interest in amusement parks. The third of three major Indianapolis amusement parks to be opened in the space of three years, White City was incorporated on October 4, 1905. Officers of the corporation included Leon Bailey of New York City and Indianapolis residents Raymond Van Camp, Robert Light (president of the Broad Ripple Rapid Transit Company), Milton Huey, and John W. Bowles. Light suggested the northern Indianapolis site for White City as he realized that placing the park at the end of the streetcar line would virtually guarantee a profit for his railway company. Park manager W. C. Tabb started to construct a boardwalk through and around a grove of tall trees and connecting various rides and exhibits.

In the months prior to its grand opening, the park had already become a favorite destination as thousands of people visited the site to watch the construction process. On May 26, 1906, White City officially opened its six iron entrance gates to the public for the first time. Park management increased local interest on Opening Day by hiring an airship (the White Eagle, owned by Horace Wild) to hover "thousands of feet over the park" as its occupants dropped money orders redeemable at the office of the Indianapolis Star.

The park's main entrance was topped with an arch that was similar to that of Frederick Ingersoll's Luna Parks and local competitor Wonderland (all of which were patterned after the entrance of Coney Island's Luna Park). Also similar to Wonderland, White City's main entrance was framed by two office buildings. After a visitor paid twenty cents to pass through the arch, the customer stepped onto the boardwalk while facing White City's bandstand.

== Attractions and exhibits ==
Although White City was situated on land adjoining White River (as was Riverside Amusement Park to the south), the park's primary drawing cards were the rides and live entertainment. Along with contemporary staples Shoot-the-Chutes, merry-go-round, roller coasters (including a scenic railway through the park's many trees), a funhouse, and other mechanical rides, White City featured a baby incubator exhibit (made popular by Luna Parks on Coney Island and in Pittsburgh, but originated in the 1898 Trans-Mississippi Exposition), a simulation of the eruption of Mount Vesuvius, and a firefighting exhibit ("Fighting the Flames") around a 500-foot-long (150 m) center court. Rides called "Razzle Dazzle", "Hale's Tour of the World", "The Hereafter", "Bump-the-Bumps", and "Loop the Loop" also proved popular with the people who visited the park. A concrete walkway over the Shoot-the-Chutes was a popular attraction in its own right as people would stand on the concrete arch to watch the riders plunge into the lake below. Postcards with pictures from this vantage point were reliable sellers in the early part of the twentieth century.

Live entertainment in the form of marching bands (military and civilian), animal acts, acrobatics, and vaudeville was a staple of White City. A renovated theater building was transformed into a roller skating rink, and a dancing pavilion and a restaurant were built from scratch. An arcade (including a shooting gallery) was built alongside the midway near the Shoot-the-Chutes' lake. Other attractions included "The Fun Factory" and the Mystic Cave. A baseball diamond was also built.

Aquatic activities were available when the park opened, with a community swimming pool and boat rides on the White River. In 1908, a two-story pavilion was opened at the riverside, along with a promenade. In addition, a large pool framed with a concrete-lined "bathing beach" was under construction as the park entered its third season of operation.

== Establishment and competition ==
White City was the third of the three Indianapolis amusement parks to have opened (Riverside Amusement Park unveiled its mechanical rides in 1903, while Wonderland had its grand opening a week before White City in 1906), and the competition amongst the three trolley parks was intense for the brief existence of White City. The three parks battled for newspaper space in 1906, buying advertising on a regular basis to tout the parks' (especially Wonderland and White City) "newest attraction". At that time, it became evident that, despite the continuing popularity of the three parks, Indianapolis could not sustain all three as the nationwide amusement park boom started to subside in the latter third of the first decade of the twentieth century.

While Riverside Amusement Park tried to survive by reducing expenditures (it stayed in business until 1970), White City and Wonderland tried different tacks in trying to boost their attendance to overcome the increased costs of insurance and construction. White City started to emphasize its live performances and its natural settings (offering more activities near the bank of the White River), while landlocked Wonderland continued the upgrading of its mechanical rides. In 1907, White City added "Paris by Night", "Kemp's Model City", a "mysterious flying lady", and a billiard hall. White City was the first Indianapolis amusement park to open that year, and its management took advantage by advertising "all roads lead to White City" in the week before the opening of Wonderland. White City (and Riverside) had live acts presenting a Wild West theme that was becoming a national rage at that time. On April 19, 1907, White City management announced plans for the construction for the "world's largest swimming pool" to be opened in 1908.

Despite attempts to differentiate White City from the other two Indianapolis parks, many of its newer offerings were usually duplicated at one or both of its competitors, from the Wild West theme to albino aerialists to additional animal acts. All three parks offered pyrotechnics for their Decoration Day celebrations, but White City also offered a re-enactment of the Thaw-White Tragedy in which New York City architect Stanford White was shot by Harry Thaw after the latter accused the former of seducing Thaw's wife, Evelyn Nesbit.

As the dog days of summer 1907 ensued, White City increased its emphases on water activities and its picnic grounds as weekly promotions not involving the mechanical rides appeared regularly in editions of the Indianapolis Star and the Indianapolis News. As the market begins to contract, White City survived the 1907 season while Wonderland almost succumbed to the competition. Only a reincorporation saved Wonderland for another season; after an infusion of new investments and an expansion of the park's facilities, the park in eastern Indianapolis managed to stay in business until it was destroyed by fire in 1911.

== Demise ==
Prior to the 1908 season, White City had also changed management, with James L. Wood taking charge of the park. Wood reversed his predecessor's plans emphasizing natural attractions and activities (but not cancelling the construction of the almost-completed swimming pool) as he added the "human roulette wheel", a haunted house ("The London Ghost Show"), a new motion picture theater, and an alligator show which Wood claimed he "dug up in a Cincinnati vaudeville show".

Interest in the park was piqued with the June 21, 1908, announcement of the impending grand opening of the swimming pool. Dug out of two acres (0.81 ha) of land, the concrete pool was surrounded with bath houses for 1000 men and 500 women. Showers with hot and cold water were constructed, and the ownership also announced plans for rental of bathing suits once the pool was open. The walkways around the pool were covered with sand to promote (in the words of White City management) a "true seashore feel". A grandstand was built for spectators as management had planned to hold an occasional boat race in the pool.

According to an article in the Indianapolis Star, a fire started in a simulated opium den in the Mystic Cave on the evening of June 26, 1908. The fire spread over virtually the entire White City grounds, sparing only the swimming pool area; the pool was scheduled to have its grand opening the next day, June 27. An investigation revealed that the source of the ignition was a burning joss stick no wider than the head of a pin. The inferno caused damage estimated at $161,000 to the uninsured park; only the Japanese bowling alley had been insured (for $1000). It proved to be a mortal blow to White City.

== After the fire ==
The park remained closed for three years. The Union Traction Company of Indiana bought it on March 6, 1911, quickly restored it, and operated it for eleven years. The pool was the main attraction, with new buildings (boathouse, dance hall, dining hall) and playground equipment to complement it. It was billed as the largest pool in the world, being 500 feet (150 m) long and 250 feet (76 m) wide, in an effort to bolster weekend traffic on the company's interurban rail line. The pool would host three prominent events: the 1922 National Swimming Event and the Olympic tryouts of 1924 and 1952. In the 1924 event Johnny Weissmuller, of Tarzan fame, won the 100-meter freestyle qualifier.

In May 1922, the park was sold to the new Broad Ripple Amusement Park Association, who soon changed the park's name to Broad Ripple Amusement Park. In 1927 the park was again sold, this time to Oscar Baur, a brewery executive from Terre Haute, Indiana.

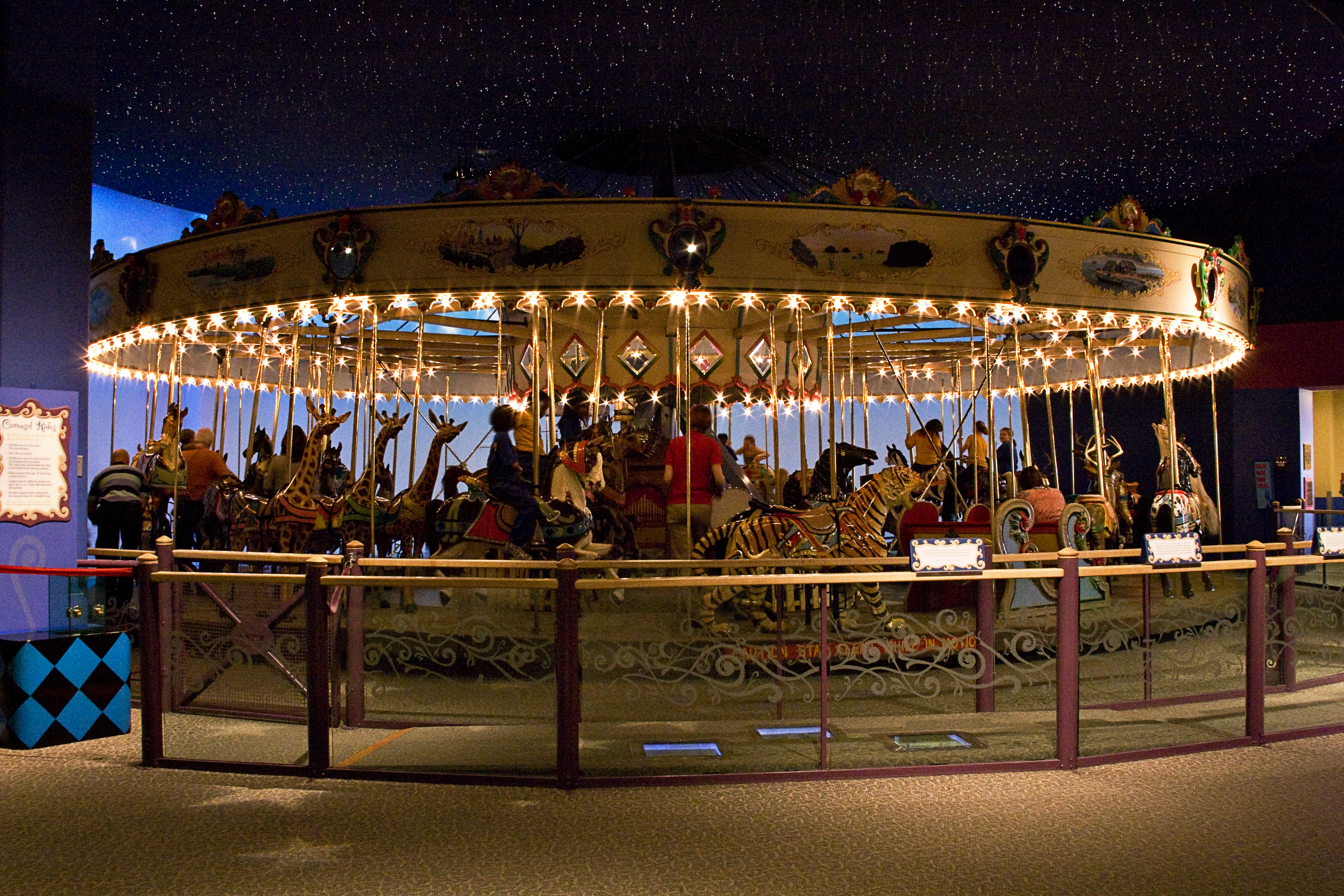
Broad Ripple Park Carousel, now located at The Children's Museum of Indianapolis

By 1938 the park boasted of its concrete pool, billed as "the world's largest", 20 acres (8 ha) of free parking, a new ballroom, and mechanized rides. The Board of Parks Commission of Indianapolis bought the property on May 18, 1945, paying $131,500 for the 60-acre (24 ha) property, and converted the grounds into a city park, which was once again named Broad Ripple Park. The city filled in the swimming pool, sold some of the remaining rides, and destroyed all of the unsold ones except for the 1917-vintage carousel, which it continued to operate until the carousel's condition deteriorated.

The animal figures Broad Ripple Park Carousel were purchased by The Children's Museum of Indianapolis starting in 1966. The museum restored and mounted the figures on a new carousel mechanism. Added to the National Register of Historic Places in 1987, the carousel is still in operation at the museum.

The steam locomotive was eventually relocated to the Indiana Transportation Museum in Noblesville, Indiana.
