= Wonderland Amusement Park (Indianapolis) =

Trolley park in Indianapolis, Indiana

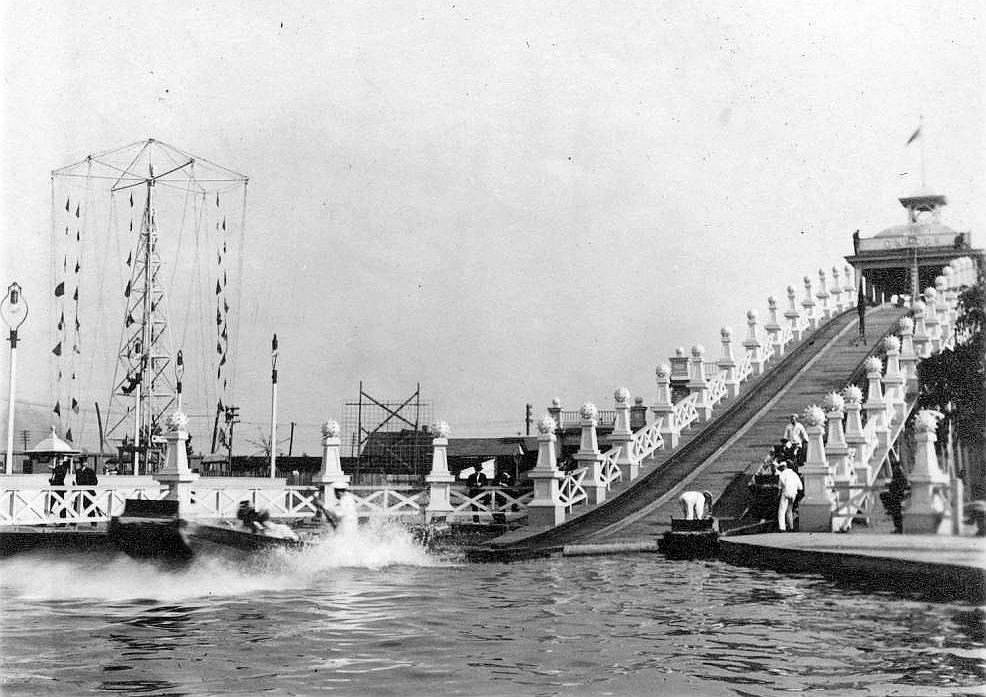
- Shoot the chute at Wonderland Amusement Park
- Location: East Washington and Gray Sts; Indianapolis, Indiana, United States
- Status: Defunct
- Opened: 1906
- Closed: 1911

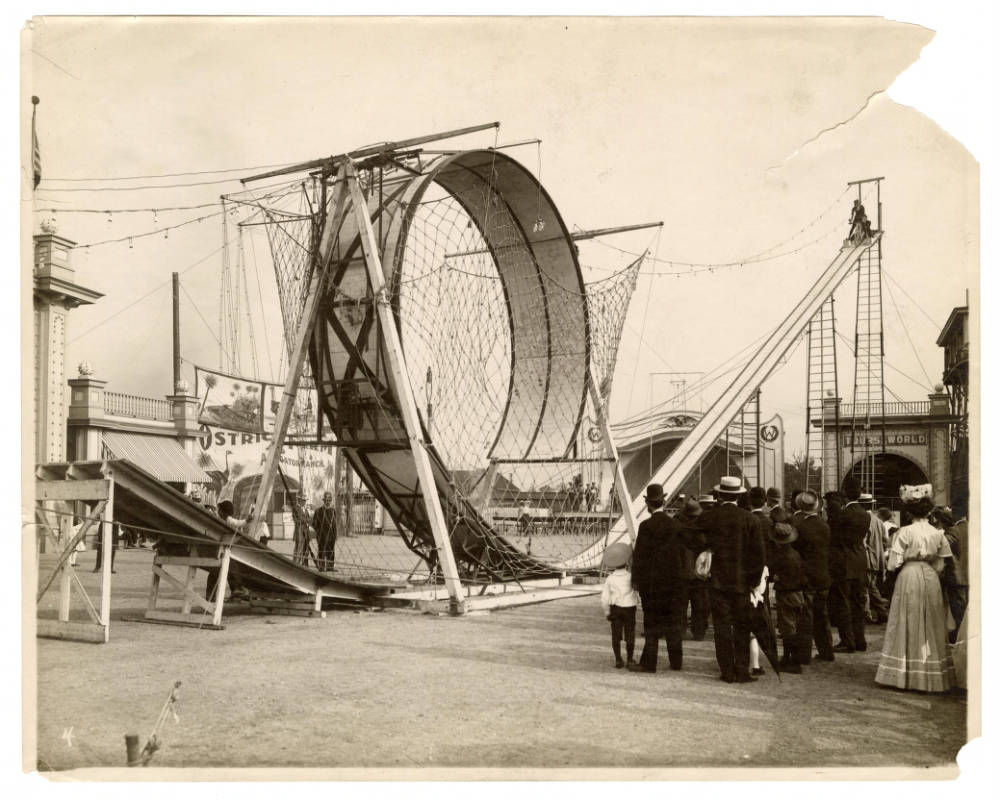
Stunt cyclist Oscar V. Babcock's performance "Death Trap Loop" at Wonderland Park.

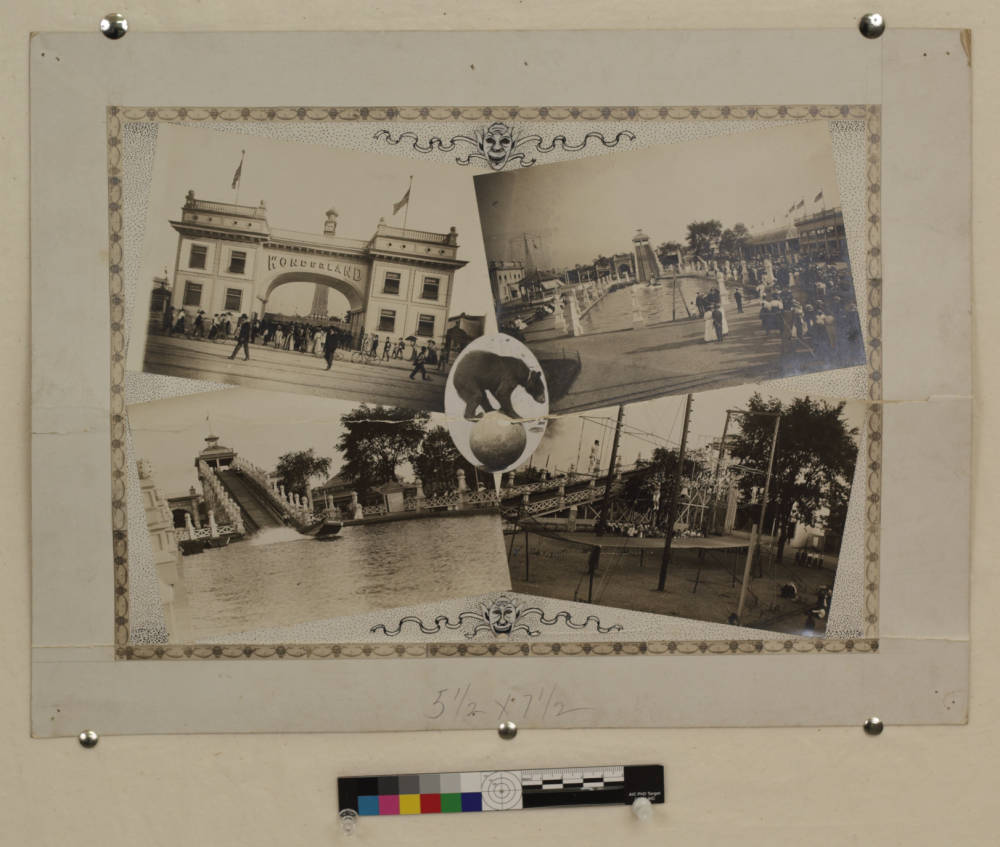
Collage of images, circa 1906–1911. The top left shows the grand entrance to Wonderland, the top right and bottom left are two views of the shoot the chute ride, and the bottom right shows the setup for an acrobatic show.

Wonderland Amusement Park (usually simply called Wonderland) was a trolley park that operated on the east side of Indianapolis, Indiana, United States, from 1906 to 1911. The park, near the intersection of East Washington Street and Gray Street, surrounded a lake and featured a shoot the chute ride, a scenic railway ride, the signature 125-foot (38 m)-tall Electric Tower, a ride that simulated the Johnstown Flood, a dirigible ("Kann's War Air-Ship"), a funhouse, a dance pavilion, and other exhibits and games in its 24 buildings. In addition to the standing attractions, the park also offered live exhibits and performances from bands, acrobats, animal acts, vaudeville acts, and members of a "Filipino tribe", the "Igorrote."

Throughout its existence, Wonderland competed against the nearby Riverside Amusement Park to the west (in Riverside) and White City to the north (in Broad Ripple Park), with each park trying to top the other two with new attractions and activities each year. In 1909, Wonderland met local resistance when it announced its intentions to add a beer garden; when Wonderland management applied for a beer license, the Indianapolis Brewers Exchange was instrumental in obtaining the park's withdrawal of the application. In 1911, the park management started to operate a "Blind Tiger" establishment (one that sells alcohol without a license to do so); it was raided by the local police. On August 27, 1911, Wonderland burned to the ground; the park was never rebuilt.

== History ==
=== Origin and grand opening ===
In the wake of the successful grand opening of Riverside Amusement Park in Indianapolis (1903), local residents Edward H. Rentsch and Minnie E. Wilson joined Milwaukee resident Richard Kann in a partnership that submitted corporation papers for the Wonderland Construction Company in November 1905. Their stated mission was to "organize, promote and carry on pleasure resorts..." and to build and maintain "buildings, structures, appliances, machinery, and lawful devices adapted thereto, and to carry on and furnish lawful amusement at such resorts". By the spring of 1906, construction of a park was started at the eastern edge of Indianapolis, near Irvington (which was later annexed by Indianapolis). The site, at the corner of East Washington and Gray Streets, covered two city blocks that once contained a baseball field.

The park had its grand opening on a rainy May 19, 1906, with 8000 customers braving the elements (it took two hours to admit the crowd). Admission cost ten cents per adult, five for each child. The park's signature 125-foot (38 m)-tall Electric Tower and scenic railroad greeted the crowds a week before the season's opening of Riverside Amusement Park and the grand opening of another nearby trolley park, White City, at a time in which the amusement park business was booming in the United States. Following the leads of the earliest Luna Parks (Coney Island, Pittsburgh, and Cleveland), Wonderland's grounds were bathed in the light of about 50,000 light bulbs. The park also employed a 100,000 watt searchlight.

Customers passed through an arch (similar to that of the Luna Parks of the era) on which the park's name – "Wonderland" – was engraved (the park's offices were located on each end of the arch). Inside the grounds, the park's buildings were painted white with yellow trim, a nod to the original White City of the World's Columbian Exposition of 1893.

=== Rides and attractions in 1906 ===
In addition to the Electric Tower (which people were encouraged to climb) and the one-quarter-mile-long scenic railroad (constructed by the L. A. Thompson Scenic Railway Company) featuring four elevated, intertwining, tracks, the crowds were treated to even more attractions. A shoot the chute ride similar to that of the park's rivals proved popular, as did a funhouse ("The Third Degree"), a circle swing ride, a giant slide ("Bump the Bump") that entertained adults and children alike, a Whip ride, and an exhibit that simulated the Johnstown Flood. A skating rink also proved popular, as did the arcade and the restaurants.

Live entertainment quickly became Wonderland's chief drawing card, from the trick motorcyclists to bands, acrobats, vaudeville acts, to a display of Igorot people from the Philippines (advertised as "a visit from the Igorrote tribe"). The park's elephant mascot bathed in the shoot the chute lagoon, delighting many patrons.

The exhibits and attractions changed almost constantly, even in Wonderland's first year of operation. The week of June 10, 1906, saw the arrival of Kann's War Airship (named after one of the park owners, Richard Kann), built in Indianapolis and temporarily moored at the park. Visitors viewed it for free in its aerodrome; it took brief flights, once in the morning, one in the evening, over the park each day while it was on exhibit.

=== 1907 ===
The year 1907 saw the arrival of equestrian acts and King Bill, touted as "the greatest trained bull in the world". King Bill made headlines when it was spooked by a blown band instrument, jumped off the platform upon which it was performing, and landed in the crowd. A new band shell adorned the park in Wonderland's second season, and a monkey house was built for 48 new simian acquisitions (following suit, Riverside Amusement Park added their own monkeys later that year). The acrobats and aerialists returned to Wonderland in 1907, including an albino aerialist (White City had another albino aerialist perform on it grounds shortly afterwards). Stunt bicyclists (which became a popular sensation at the time) replaced stunt motorcyclists on the performing stage.

In addition to the acrobats, live entertainment at Wonderland frequently included animal acts. The aforementioned monkeys, horses, and Big Bill were augmented by trained lions, ostriches, alligators, and elephants in 1907.

As the competition among the three Indianapolis parks continued to heat up, Riverside Amusement Park reduced its advertising and reduced its expenditures of constantly updating the park and White City started emphasizing its natural features at Broad Ripple Park to try to maintain its customer base in the light of Indianapolis' slow decrease in entertainment dollars. Wonderland, the only major Indianapolis park not to have water access was forced to maintain its costly routine of renovating and upgrading itself and introducing new rides and attractions, making its continuing existence more and more problematic. The three parks had drawn a combined one million patrons in 1906–1907.

Increasing costs of construction of new rides and attractions, coupled with an increasing need to advertise, eventually forced a change of ownership of Wonderland. The Wonderland Construction Company gave way to a new publicly owned corporation, the Wonderland Amusement Company; the officers include Indianapolis resident E. I. Fisher (also the president of Capital Paper Company) as president of Wonderland, Frank M. Talbott (Indianapolis Basket Company), A. Lehman (Indianapolis Paper Box Company), and park general manager Frank M. Wicks. Capital stock was issued in an effort to maintain profitability.

=== 1908 ===
The new ownership wasted no time in upgrading Wonderland, adding eight attractions in 1908. In addition to a new restaurant, the "Flatiron" proved to be an instant success as the new building offered "human squirrel cake", and trick floors, carpets, and ceilings (the Flatiron was advertised as a "show" geared to those who wished "harmless excitement with a touch of terror". New features include "Brewster's Millions" (inspired by the popular novel by George Barr McCutcheon), "Ray's Manikans", "The Tickle", "Battle Royal", and the "Old Swimmin' Hole".

The restaurant patrons enjoyed their sodas as they enjoyed the live entertainment that was a mainstay of the park. Vaudeville shows were the primary source of entertainment, augmented with performances of Sleight's Military Band. In June 1908, Millie Spellman brought her drinking and cigarette-smoking bears to Wonderland as the Teddy bear craze was beginning to take hold in the United States.

The initial reaction to the new attractions kept the park's precarious finances hidden as rival parks found new ways to preserve the bottom line. White City also introduced new attractions and finished its construction of a huge swimming pool (covering two acres, it was scheduled to open June 27); Riverside Amusement Park sharply reduced its construction and advertising costs, opting to rely upon the rides it had the previous year and showcasing "the world's largest steer".

The night of June 26, 1908, Wonderland's competition lessened as White City was destroyed by fire. Only the swimming pool, scheduled to open the following morning, was left: it had its grand opening the following week (July 4, 1908). The same day, Wonderland had its largest attendance in its history for its annual Independence Day festivities.

Such a turnout encouraged the ownership to develop expansion plans, some of which were leaked to the public in the latter months of 1908... including that of building a beer garden. When the plans were officially announced (March 1909), Wonderland was embroiled in controversy unlike any it had encountered before.

=== 1909–1911 ===
Flush with the success of 1908, ownership moved forward with expansion plans for Wonderland, moving eastward toward Irvington, an Indianapolis suburb (since merged into the larger city) that prohibited the sale of alcoholic beverages within its city limits. By mid-March, the already-wary neighbors became alarmed when the rumored plans for a new beer garden on the newly extended park property were confirmed. On March 23, a petition drive by a coalition of area mother's groups ("Send a Petition to Wonderland") was reported by the Indianapolis News. The mother's groups, assisted by members of various regional temperance groups, requested that Wonderland withdraw its application for a liquor license and asserted that the detrimental effects of liquor would not only adversely affect those who would attend the park but also those who "would no longer patronize the resort".

The next day, the application was withdrawn. Instead of a German beer garden, a German Village would be installed instead. While the park announcement publicly acknowledge the petitions, the deciding point was made by the Indianapolis Brewers Exchange, whose truckers started boycotting the park once the controversy arose. The brewers, fearful of the brouhaha spreading to them, united behind the truckers and the mother's groups.

The contretemps did not help the park's attempt to battle a national trend of declining amusement park traffic. By the middle of the 1909 season, attendance had become so poor that the park no longer maintained a full-time operating schedule. Eventually, the park would open only for "special events" in which various organizations would rent the grounds and equipment for private parties.

In 1909–1911, the primary patron was the International Interdenominational County Fair, with the proceeds of the festivities benefitting the Summer Mission for Sick Children, a local charity. The fair's organizers were responsible for promotion, stating in its ads for the 1911 fair that Wonderland had newly renovated its shoot the chute and scenic railway rides.

=== 1911 police raid ===
The 1911 International Interdenominational County Fair started positively, drawing the park's largest crowds since 1908 for the first three days. The sixth day of the fair was overshadowed by a police raid of the German Village. The park had been "teasing" the public about a new attraction, the "Blind Tiger," for weeks. Peter B. Trone, manager of the about-to-be-opened attraction, stated to the local media that his establishment would be the only "wet" place in the park (despite not having a licence to sell alcoholic beverages). Knowing that "blind tiger" was code for an establishment that sold alcohol illegally, the Indianapolis Police Department conducted a raid of the premises on its opening day, August 17, 1911. Trone thwarted the raid as he delayed the police entry as the bartenders hid the illicit beverages as the customers drank ginger ale chasers and then mopped their lips. After finding insufficient evidence to arrest anybody in the facility, the police promised an additional raid should the "Blind Tiger" remain in business.

The County Fair completed its 1911 run at Wonderland the next day without further incident. It was the penultimate engagement for Wonderland as the end of the season (the last week in August) was in sight.

=== Demise of Wonderland ===
The first time that Wonderland advertised in media geared toward African Americans (in the August 26, 1911, Indianapolis Recorder) also proved to be the last. After a week in which the park was set aside for the exclusive use of the Colored Pythians, the ad announced that the following day was the last of the 1911 season and (contrary to attendance policies of any of the Indianapolis amusement parks) Wonderland would be "open exclusively for colored people". The day was a success, and the Colored Pythians held a celebration and left the park before the gates had closed at 11:00 pm.

Less than two hours later, the park's night watchman observed flames and notified the local fire department. One half-hour later, the first fire truck arrived as the merry-go-round and the shoot the chute were already burning. By 3:00 am the park was completely involved in flames. By dawn, the firemen had put out the last of the fire, but virtually everything in the park was destroyed, and Wonderland would never reopen. Authorities assumed that the fire was sparked by a discarded cigarette.
