= Indianola Park =

Former amusement park in Columbus, Ohio, US

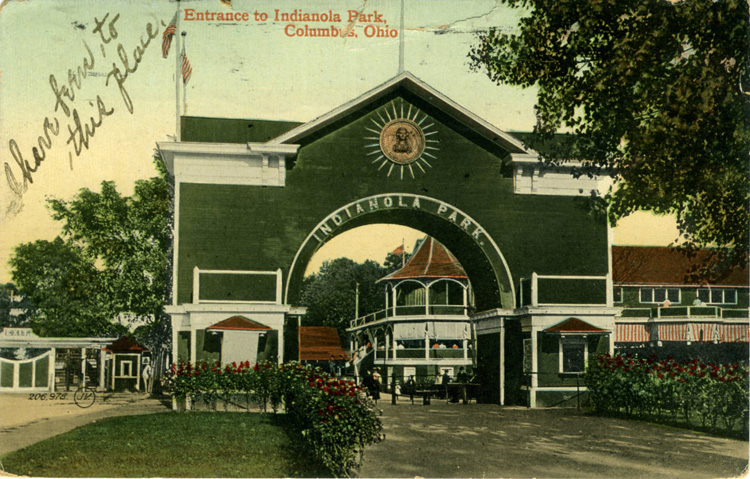
- Indianola Park's entrance was on the corner of 19th Avenue and 4th Street.
- Interactive map of Indianola Park
- Coordinates: 40.002881°N 82.997686°W
- Status: Defunct
- Opened: 1905
- Closed: 1937

Indianola Park was a trolley park that operated in Columbus, Ohio's University District from 1905 to 1937. The amusement park was created by Charles Miles and Frederick Ingersoll, and peaked in popularity in the 1910s, entertaining crowds of up to 10,000 with the numerous roller coasters and rides, with up to 5,000 in the massive pool alone. The park was also the home field for the Columbus Panhandles for half of a decade. In the 1920s, new owners bought and remodeled the park, and it did well until it closed at the end of the Great Depression.

Currently, the land, which extends from 18th Avenue to Norwich Avenue and 4th Street to Big Four Street, is occupied by the former Indianola Junior High School and the Indianola Shopping Center, which is owned by Xenos Christian Fellowship, and includes Suzi-Cue Pool Hall, Soussy Market, 4th Street Studio, and King's Pizza.

== Location ==
The entrance to Indianola Park was at N 4th Street and E 19th Avenue. The park itself covered approximately 30 acres (120,000 m^{2}) and extended north from E 18th Avenue north to E Norwich Avenue, and east from N 4th Street to Big Four Street and the railroad tracks.

== History ==
=== Miles' vision ===
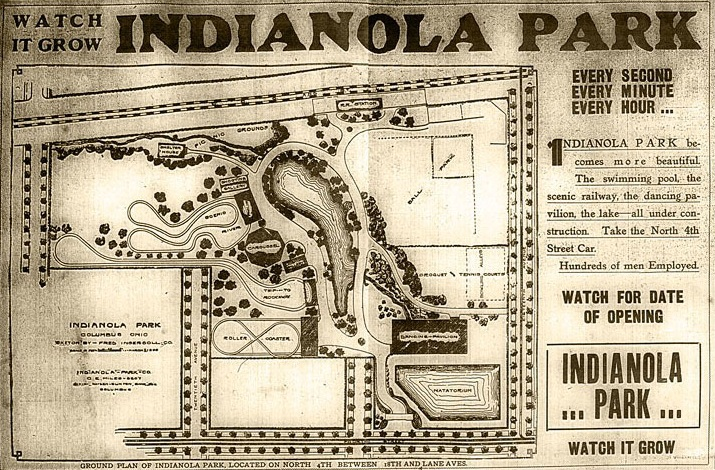
The park advertised a great deal before opening.

Indianola Park was established by dentist-turned-developer Charles Miles, who was president of the Summit Land Company, which developed residential neighborhoods in the former farmland across High Street from the Ohio State University. He was inspired to go into the amusement park business, because he saw how well Coney Island's new Luna Park was doing, and he had experience using recreations to draw buyers. The park was designed by amusement park impresario Frederick Ingersoll, who also designed the Luna Parks in Pittsburgh and Cleveland, and the gates were opened to the public on June 8, 1905.

In its original configuration, the park featured a dance pavilion, a very large swimming pool, an Ingersoll figure 8 roller coaster, a carousel, a scenic railroad, a band shell, a restaurant, concession stands, picnic grounds, and athletic playing fields, such as tennis courts, a football field, and a baseball diamond.

In 1908, a theater was added, and Indianola began presented vaudeville for its patrons. The park entertained visitors with everything from Shakespeare's plays and Greek dances, to circus animals and diving horses. Events like hot air balloon ascensions, tightrope walking, outdoor cinema, live presentations of distant sporting events, infant beauty pageants, and massive fireworks extravaganzas were also part of the park's draw.

A year later, the park underwent major renovations. The band shell area was expanded, and a Shoot the Chute ride, The Blue Streak roller coaster, and a "Human Laundry" funhouse were added. For the next five years, the park was home field for the Columbus Panhandles, an early professional football team.

Indianola enjoyed sustained popularity through the 1910s. Crowds as large as 10,000 flocked to the park on weekends, with up to 5,000 in the pool alone on hot summer days. And in the winter, the dance pavilion remained popular, buoyed by the national dance craze launched by Irene and Vernon Castle, and, in 1918, the park even hosted the Ohio State Buckeyes men's basketball games.

=== Revitalization ===
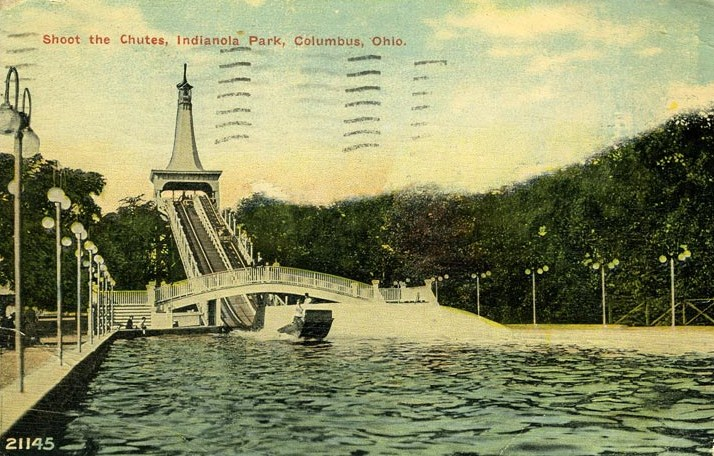
Indianola Park's Shoot the Chute ride, added by the second owners, was a popular attraction.

In 1923, the park underwent a change in management. The new owners invested thousands of dollars in renovations. For weeks before opening day, advertisements trumpeted "A Greater Indianola" and "The Biggest Year of All". The dance pavilion was remodeled for The Jazz Age, repairs were made to the swimming pool, and the locker areas were expanded. New attractions were also added, such as a roller coaster called Thriller, a Seaplane Swing ride, a caterpillar ride, The Joyplane, and Custer Cars, an early version of bumper cars.

Indianola also became much more aggressive in advertising and promotions, aiming to create "a clean and orderly park for clean and orderly people". The park gradually dropped vaudeville and band concerts. The dance pavilion orchestra was replaced with local and touring jazz bands, which were favored by flappers, with two of the most popular bands being Phil Baxter's Texas Tommies and Tom Howard's Melody Lads.

The park continued to do well into the mid-1920s. However, in 1927, the park sold its land north of E. 19th Avenue to the Columbus Board of Education for the construction of a new school, Indianola Junior High School, which opened in 1929.

Reduced to just its core, the dance pavilion and the pool, Indianola stayed open into the 1930s. The Great Depression made a challenging situation even more difficult, because few people had money to spare for a day at the amusement park. However, the record hot summers of the early 1930s helped keep the park afloat during the lean years, with temperature at nearly 100 °F for weeks on end. When the hot summers passed after the 1937 season, Indianola Park closed.

=== Shopping center ===
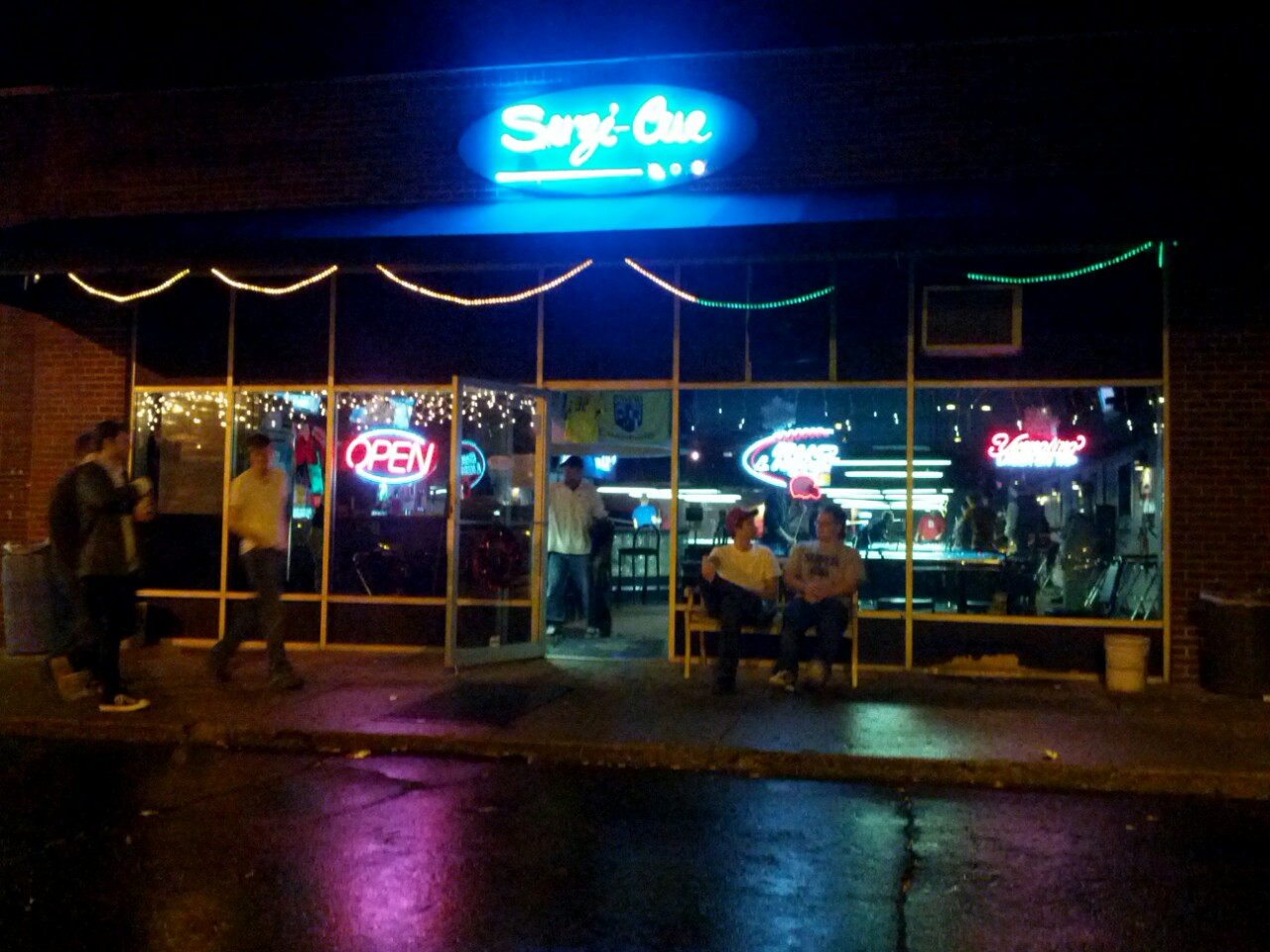
Suzi-Cue Pool Hall is the oldest tenant in the Indianola Park Shopping Center.

In 1948, Indianola Park was converted into Indianola Park Shopping Center, and the pool was filled in and paved over for a parking lot. The former dance pavilion became an Ohio Giant Market, and a dozen or so other shops and restaurants were built around its perimeters by 1952, such as a flower shop, a beauty shop, a bakery, a gift shop, an appliance store, a fashion boutique, a dry cleaner, a pharmacy, a laundromat, a finance center, a hardware store, a variety store, and a restaurant.

With the influx of students at the end of the Vietnam War, Ohio State enrollment went up to almost 50,000 students. This changed the businesses. By 1978, the shops included three restaurants, two new pharmacies, two realtors, a Salvation Army Thrift Store, and a coffee shop, as well as new grocery, sporting goods, and appliance stores. In the early 1980s, Suzi-Cue Pool Hall, a local dive bar and billiards hall, moved into the complex. By 1990, Both Suzi-Cue and the Salvation Army remained, but the rest of the businesses had moved out, being replaced by Soussy Market, C&M Towing, a hair salon, and Christian Embassy.

In 2006, Xenos Christian Fellowship purchased Indianola Park Shopping Center, just before Indianola Junior High School closed in 2010. They spent $4 million massively rehabilitating the mall and converting the old dance pavilion into a worship center. They replaced plumbing, heating/cooling, and electrical systems, added new lighting, planted trees, and repaved the lot. As part of the deal, the church was required to purchase the entire shopping mall, which still includes long-term tenants Soussy Market and Suzi-Cue, and has been joined by 4th Street Studio and King's Pizza. Once a week, a clinic also provides medical care to the needy, and, every summer, there is an urban farmer's market hosts an urban farmer's market. The last remaining parts of the park are some of original trees from the original picnic area, located behind the defunct school.

== Attractions ==
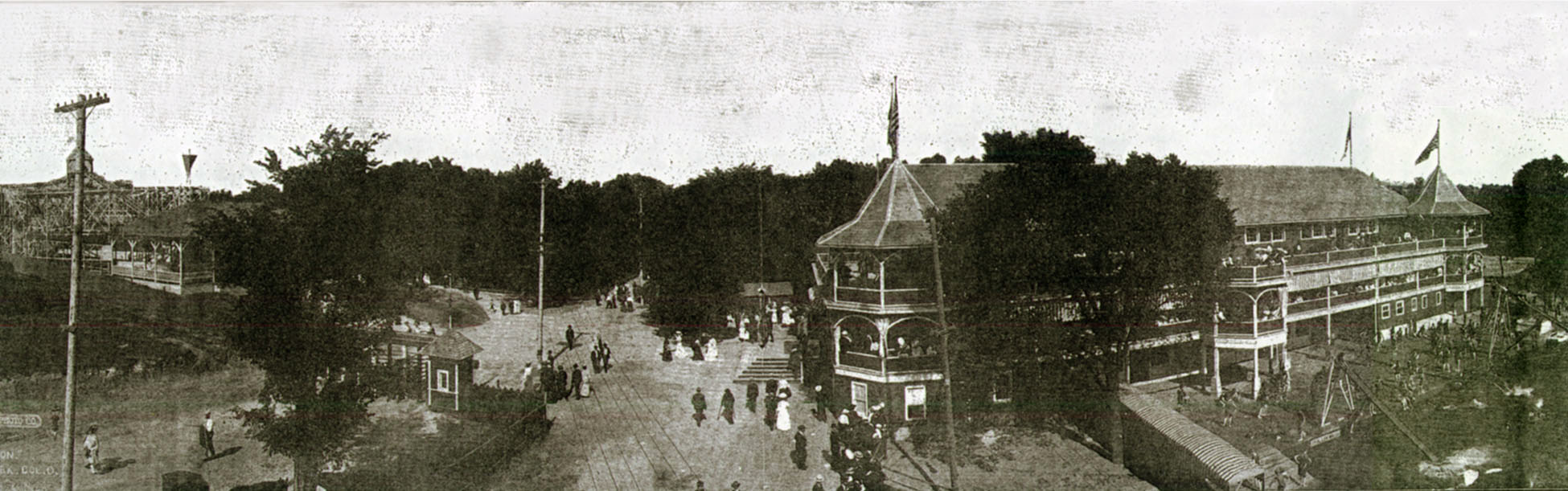
Indianola Park put out a promotional booklet in 1908, which included a fold-out panorama photograph of the park as a centerpiece.
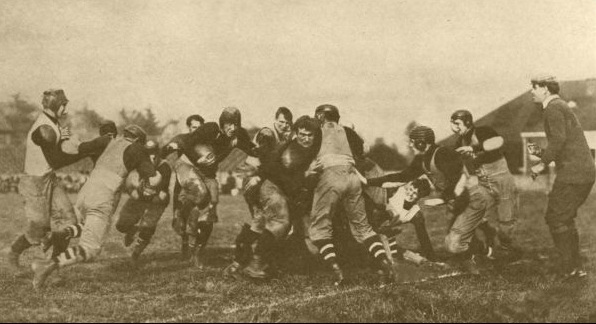
In the 1910s, the Columbus Panhandles played at Indianola Park.

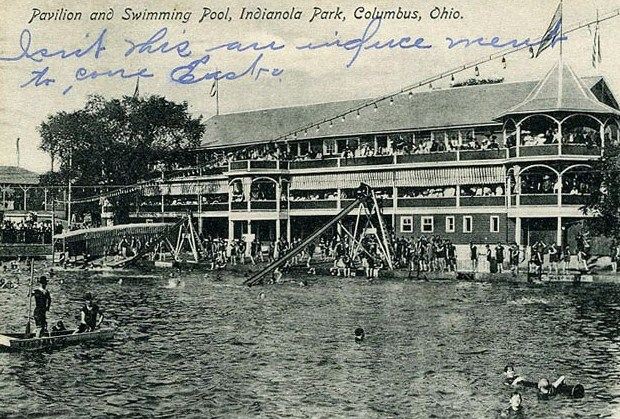
This is the pool of Indianola Park, as viewed from the southwest.

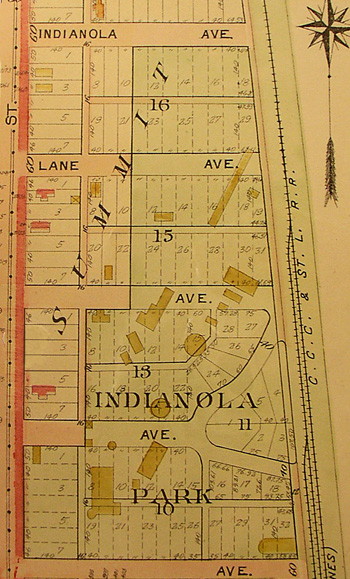
In 1909, the park was its largest size.

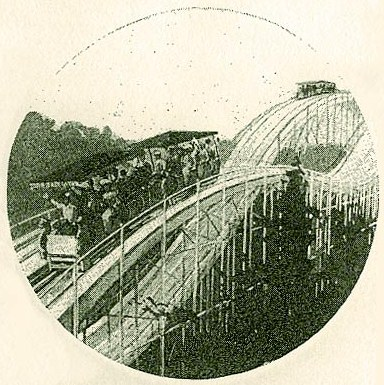
There were multiple roller coasters.

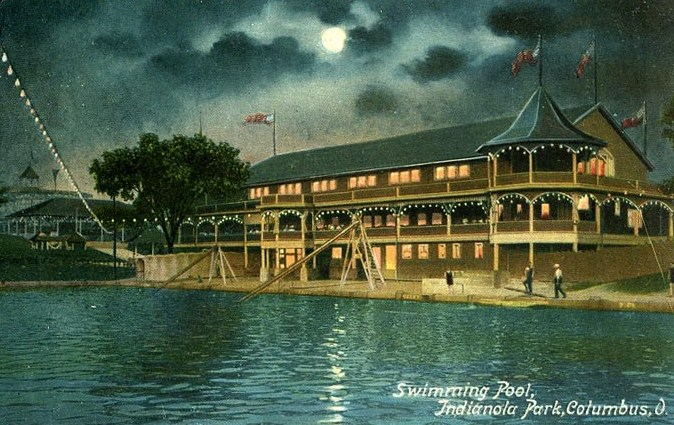
The Dance Pavilion is the only part of the park still standing today.

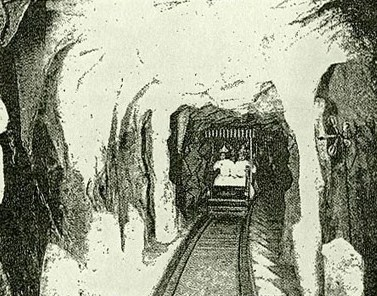
Scenic railroads were popular at the time.

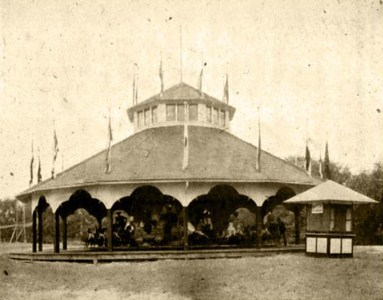
The park had a carousel.

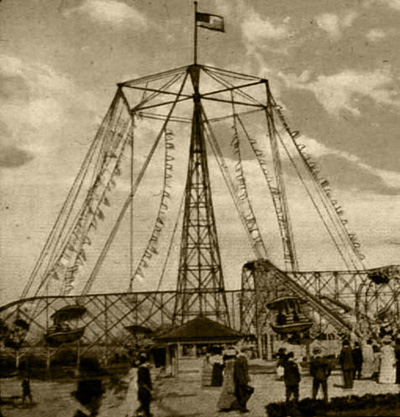
The Seaplane Swing was a favorite.

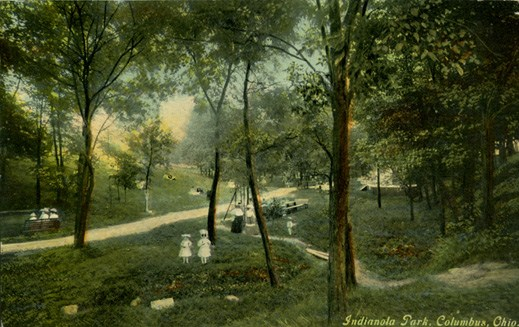
There was a massive picnic area, with streams and bridges.

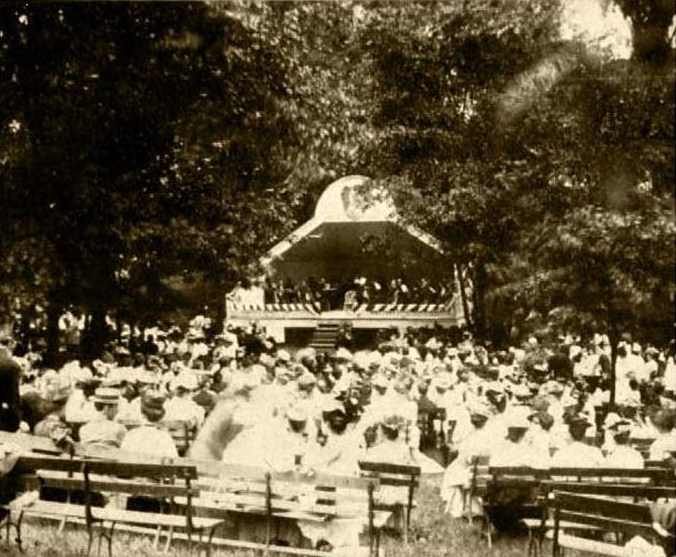
The band shell had various famous acts in its day.

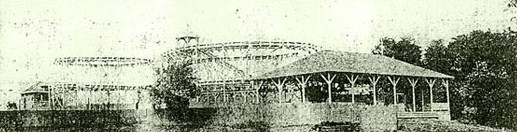
The Ingersoll was the "smoothest and fastest" roller coaster in existence.

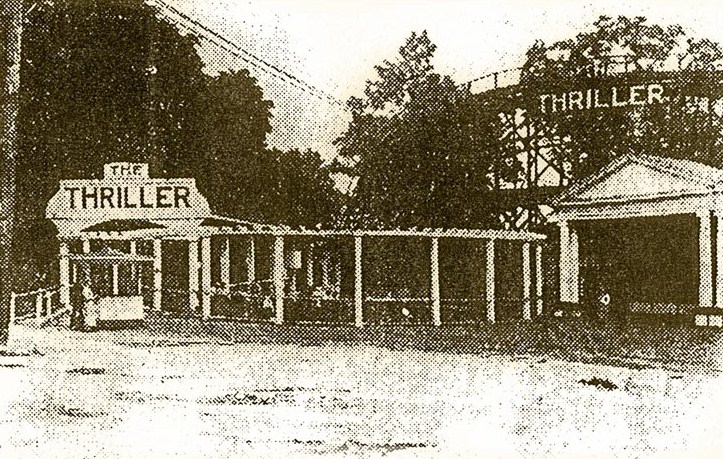
The Thriller was a roller coaster at the park.

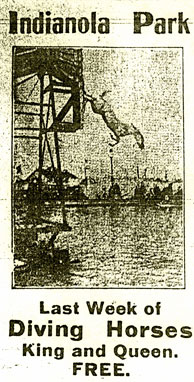
Circus acts and diving horses were popular.

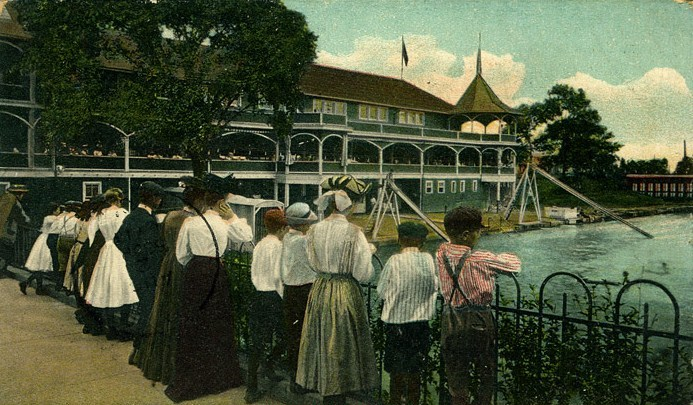
Indianola Park had a large swimming pool and a notable dancing hall.

== See also ==
- Olentangy Park
- Minerva Park
