= Frederick Ingersoll =

American entrepreneur, designer and inventor

- Born: Frederick Ingersoll; 1876; New Jersey, United States
- Died: October 23, 1927 (aged 51); Omaha, Nebraska, United States
- Occupations: Inventor; Designer and Builder businessaman
- Years active: 1900-1927
- Known for: Luna Park

Frederick Ingersoll (1876 – October 23, 1927) was an American inventor, designer, builder and entrepreneur who created the world's first chain of amusement parks (known collectively as "Luna Parks" regardless of their actual name) and whose manufacturing company built 277 roller coasters, fueling the popularity of trolley parks in the first third of the twentieth century. Some of these parks and roller coasters still exist today.

== Biography ==
Ingersoll was born in New Jersey, one of five brothers. By 1900, he had moved to Glenfield, Pennsylvania, a community on the Ohio River near Pittsburgh. His 1900 United States census form described his occupation as a "coin machine proprietor," but his manufacturing company did more than just sell vending machines: they made them and amusement park rides as well.

=== Ingersoll Construction ===
In the 1890s, he designed (and the Ingersoll Construction Company built) roller coasters - mainly the type now known as "figure eight" coasters like the first one to be installed in Kennywood Park (1902) - and scenic railroads (originally called "Russian Mountains" as the type originated in Europe). Ingersoll also designed and built another ride that many parks presented as their signature attraction, the Shoot-the-Chutes water ride, a type that has since evolved into the modern log flume that many current parks feature.

By 1901, Ingersoll and his company broadened their scope from designing and building amusement park rides to designing and building amusement parks themselves. Two early successes, Riverside Amusement Park in Indianapolis and Rocky Glen Park near Moosic, Pennsylvania, were trolley parks designed, built, and opened by Ingersoll by 1903 and 1905 respectively. With the success of the Ingersoll parks (and that of Coney Island's Luna Park, which opened the same year), Ingersoll conceived of an amusement park chain, featuring establishments both individually and collectively named Luna Park. By 1904, the Luna Park Amusement Company was formed with investor help.

=== Luna Parks ===
After the 1905 opening of Indianola Park in Columbus, Ohio, Ingersoll turned his attention to his proposed Luna Park chain. The first two, Cleveland and Pittsburgh - the 36th and 37th parks designed and made by Ingersoll Company - ignited an explosion of park building worldwide, with Luna Parks (both associated with Ingersoll and those having no such connection) being spread around the world. While some Luna Parks (such as Cleveland and Pittsburgh) opening to sizable success, the monetary demands of constantly maintaining and updating rides and other attractions led Ingersoll to declare bankruptcy in 1908.

As a result of bankruptcy proceedings, the Cleveland flagship park was sold to one of the investors of the Luna Park Amusement Company, Matthew Bramley, owner of the Cleveland Trinidad Paving Company (at the time the world's largest paving company). Bramley eventually became owner of Luna Park Amusement Company as Ingersoll's monetary problems continued in the 1910s. For a second bankruptcy filing (in 1911), Ingersoll listed liabilities of $179,668 and assets of three suits of clothes, valued at $75.

The design and construction of Ingersoll roller coasters, Shoot-the-Chutes, and Luna Parks continued through the 1910s and 1920s despite Ingersoll's never-ending money problems. The oldest Luna Park that is still in operation (Melbourne, Australia) opened in 1912; while the Mexico City Luna Park was short-lived, Luna Loca is currently in operation on the site, while Athens' Ta Aidonakia is a descendant of Ingersoll's Luna Park. At its peak, his amusement park empire had 44 sites; his construction company had built 277 roller coaster rides, many of them for parks that competed against his Luna Parks at one time or another, from Charleston, West Virginia to Buenos Aires (the latter later becoming the site of an athletic arena), to Lisbon. "Luna Park" had entered the vernacular for an amusement park (at one point, Ingersoll had briefly renamed the parks that his company designed, built, and owned as "Ingersoll Luna Parks" to distinguish them from those to which he had no connection). In Turkey, all amusement parks are called "Luna Park" regardless of their official names.

=== Death and eulogy ===
Ingersoll was found dead at Omaha's Krug Park by an apparent suicide on October 23, 1927. In 1929, former roller coaster designer of Ingersoll Construction, John A. Miller, eulogized him by stating, "We owe all the success of the amusement park to Fred Ingersoll." In the same eulogy, Lloyd Jeffries followed up by proclaiming "Ingersoll was the tree from which the amusement limbs branched forth, as many of the leading park men of today came from that tree in one way or another."

== Ingersoll amusement parks ==
While Ingersoll's amusement parks were collectively known as Luna Parks, many of his company's creations had other names. Below is a sampling of the parks that were designed and built by the Ingersoll Construction Company prior to Ingersoll's death in 1927:

- Riverside Amusement Park (Indianapolis, Indiana, 1903–1970)
- Rocky Glen Park (near Moosic, Pennsylvania, 1904–1987)
- Carnival Court (Buffalo, New York, 1904–1920), became Luna Park before being damaged by fire July 14, 1909, later changed its name to Athletic Park
- Indianola Park (Columbus, Ohio, 1905–1937)
- Luna Park, Pittsburgh (1905–1909)
- Luna Park, Cleveland (1905–1930)
- Luna Park, Schenectady (1901–1933, Ingersoll added the amusement park in 1906), later known as Dolle's Park and Rexford Park
- Luna Park, Alexandria County (now Arlington County), Virginia (near Washington, D.C., 1906–1915)
- Luna Park, Scranton (Pennsylvania, 1906–1916)
- Luna Park, Mexico City (1906-?)
- Luna Park, Mansfield (Mansfield, Ohio, 1907-1940s)
- Luna Park, Berlin (1909–1933)
- Luna Park, Charleston (West Virginia, 1912–1922)
- Luna Park Aidonaka - now Ta Aidonakia, park near Athens
