= Rocky Glen Park =

Former amusement park in Moosic, Pennsylvania

- Location within Pennsylvania
- 41.353271°N 75.705919°W
- Location: Rocky Glen Rd., 1/4 mile off Rt. 502
- Nearest city: Moosic, Pennsylvania

History
- Built: 1886

Site notes
- Architect(s): Arthur Frothingham; Frederick Ingersoll
- Governing body: None

Rocky Glen Park was a trolley park located near Moosic, Pennsylvania. Founded by Arthur Frothingham in 1886 as picnic grounds, it was transformed into an amusement park by engineer and entrepreneur Frederick Ingersoll in 1904. The park featured rides, arcades, and restaurants until its closure in 1987.

== History ==
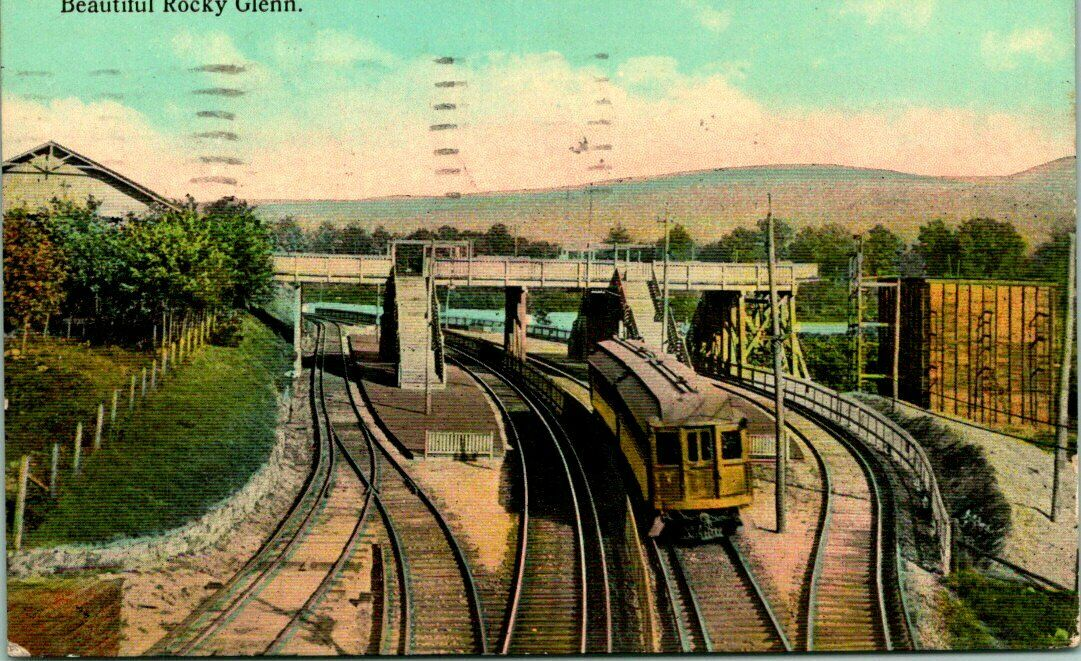
A 1915 postcard of a Lackawanna and Wyoming Valley Railroad interurban train at the park

Land developer Arthur Frothingham purchased the site for $15 at a tax sale in 1885. The following year, Rocky Glenn was open to the public as a picnic park. In 1900, Frothingham contracted E. S. Williams to dam Dry Valley Run Creek to create a lake on the property. When Frothingham failed to pay Williams for the work, Williams sued and was awarded one-half interest in the park.

Soon afterward, Frothingham obtained a Pennsylvania state cemetery charter for the park after learning of plans of extending tracks of the Lehigh Valley Railroad over the grounds. To avoid losing the park through eminent domain, Frothingham interred two bodies in the proposed route of the track. The Lehigh Valley Railroad purchased a parcel of the cemetery for $25,000 and agreed to build a Laurel Line station nearby.

In 1904, park manager Frederick Ingersoll added amusement park rides and concessions and renamed the park Rocky Glen Park after the newly formed Rocky Glen Water Company. The following year saw the debut of Ingersoll's signature figure 8 roller coaster. A rift between Frothingham and Ingersoll led to their parting of ways in 1906.

Interest in the park waned in the 1910s, and Frothingham wished to sell his half of the property. After failed attempts to sell the park to Metro-Goldwyn-Mayer and Federal Feature Film Corporation of New York, Williams and Frothingham sold it to a trio of businessmen in 1919: John Nallin, Joe Jennings, and Ben Sterling. After a tumultuous period in which the three partners disagreed over park management (culminating in Rocky Glen Park being divided in two by a fence), Sterling ultimately gained complete control in 1950 and renamed the park Sterling's Rocky Glen. Later, the park was known simply as Sterling's

In 1945, Sterling added the Million Dollar Coaster, an out-and-back roller coaster that became the park's signature attraction. It had a maximum height of 96 feet, and was 3,700 feet long. Despite its name, the ride cost Sterling only $100,000 to build. It was one of the world's largest roller coasters at the time. It carried more than one million passengers in the first three years of operation, and it was dismantled in 1957.

The post-World War II increase in the use of the automobile contributed to the gradual decline in the use of the railroad which led to the park, and many remaining trolley parks were closing all around the country. Sterling's Rocky Glen was no exception, its plight exacerbated by the decline in the coal industry at the same time (a prominent revenue stream in the area). In 1970, Sterling opted to sell the park to an Atlanta-based entertainment company, National Recreation Service.

The new owners promptly converted the grounds into a theme park, renaming it Ghost Town in the Glen (later Ghost Town Amusement Park) and gave it a western theme. The rebrand was not successful, and the park changed hands once again in 1979 and became New Rocky Glen. The property became a venue for concerts starting in 1980. The park permanently closed in 1987.

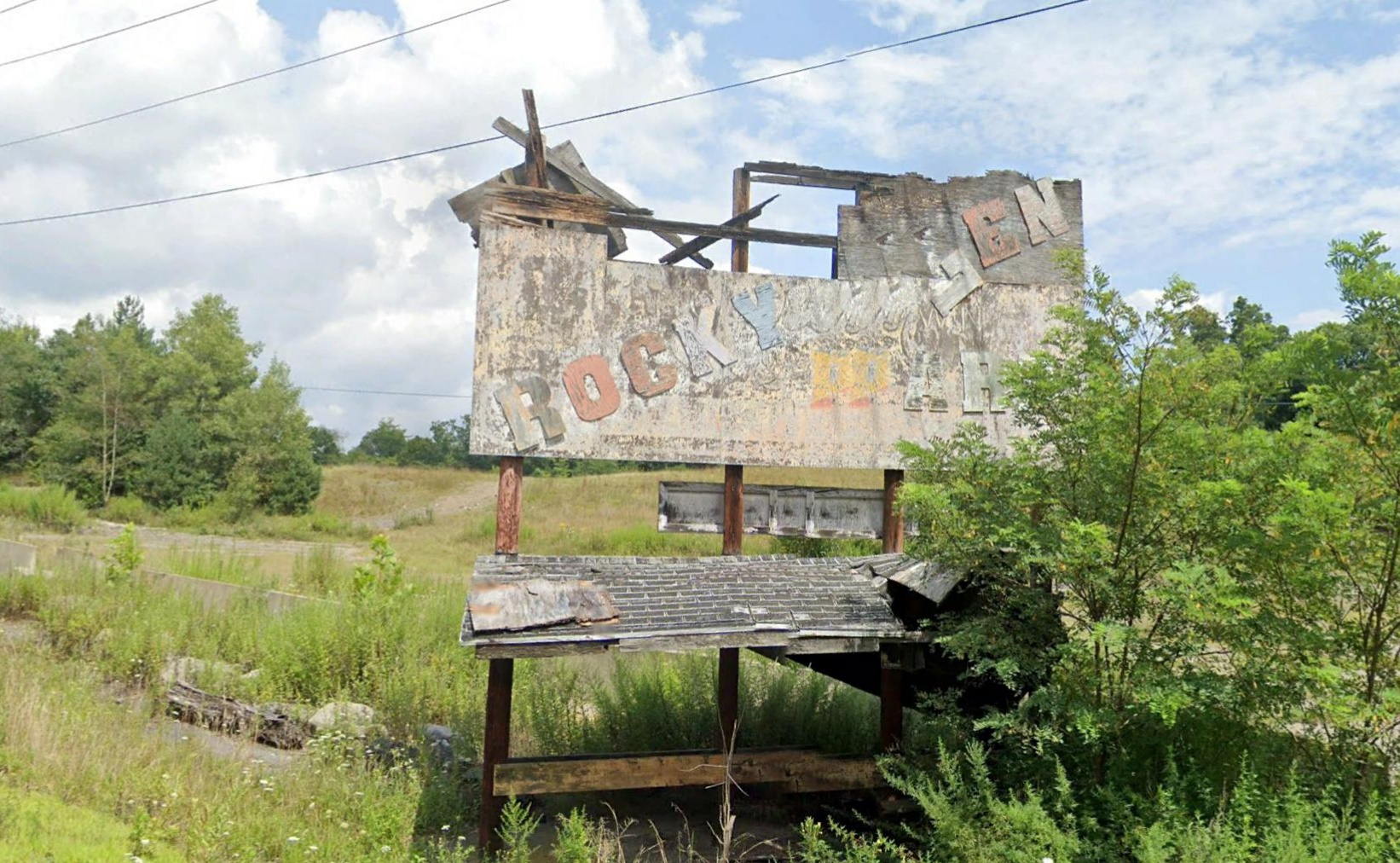
The former entrance sign of Rocky Glen Park is the only remaining structure of the park

== Former roller coasters ==
Rocky Glen Park was home to several roller coasters in its history:

- Figure 8 (August 6, 1904 – 1913) - Built by Frederick Ingersoll in 1904 and opened August 6. Removed when Ingersoll's original 10-year lease expired in 1913.
- Mountain Dips Coaster (August 5, 1920 – December 1939) - Designed by John A. Miller and construction supervised by Herbert Schmeck, it was built in 1920 by the Philadelphia Toboggan Company for $70,000 after Rocky Glen Park reopened in the 1919 season under new ownership (the park had been without rides from 1914 to 1919 since the original 10-year lease expired). It was built in front of the dam which also crossed over the Laurel Line railroad tracks and was considered the largest on the eastern seaboard in its early years. It was unique in that the lift hill was halfway through the ride, instead of at the beginning. The lift hill was structurally connected to the Laurel Line station's entrance overpass in its earlier design, but this was later removed. The coaster was removed in December 1939. A death that occurred on Mountain Dips Coaster in September 1939 may have influenced this.
- Pippin Coaster (May 24, 1924 – May 24, 1950) - Built in 1924 for $70,000 by John A. Miller. This coaster was the main attraction of the Nallin-Jennings side of Rocky Glen Park during the time when the park was split in half. On May 24, 1950, a fire damaged the front half of Pippin Coaster. Pippin Coaster's back half stood out of operation for several years until 1954, when it was finally razed. Foundations of the coaster are buried in the ground, and still visible as of 2023.
- Jazz Railway (1925 – 1927) - Built by Harry G. Traver. It was situated in the location of where the Million Dollar Coaster would eventually stand.
- Million Dollar Coaster (May 25, 1946 – January 1958) - Initially, the coaster was to be called "Sterling's Coaster", but advertisements stating "Come ride Ben Sterling's 'Million Dollar' Roller Coaster", led to the widespread use of the "Million Dollar" moniker. It was built in late 1945 for only $100,000, intended as the replacement for the Mountain Dips Coaster. Vernon Keenan of the National Amusement Devices Company of Ohio designed it. Its initial drop was 96 feet, and it was approximately 3,700 feet long. Being located close to the lake warped its supports over time, and it was condemned in 1957. Million Dollar Coaster was partially dismantled in early 1958, and pieces of it were used in the construction of the Jet Coaster. In 1962, a brush fire destroyed the last remnants of the coaster, which led to its final razing.
- Jet / Mighty Lightnin' Coaster (May 3, 1959 – August 24, 1988) - Designed by John C. Allen of the Philadelphia Toboggan Company, and construction supervised by Frank F. Hoover. The lift hill was 55 feet high. The coaster stood after the closure of the park in 1987 for several years until parts of it were destroyed by a fire. The removal of another nearby ride resulted in said ride falling on the remains of Jet Coaster. The coaster was finally demolished in December 1994.
- Monster Mouse (1982) - A steel wild mouse roller coaster located next to Jet Coaster.

== Miniature railroad ==
The Clifford Township Volunteer Fire Company in Susquehanna County, Pennsylvania is home to a miniature railroad that once existed at Rocky Glen Park. The train is a National Amusement Device / Dayton Fun House ride. It was bought from the John A. Miller Company and added to Rocky Glen in 1924. It operated on the same path the first miniature railroad until 1950, when a fire destroyed much of the park. The train was sold to Benjamin & Lena Balka in December 1950, who in turn sold it to the new owner of the park, Ben Sterling. Sterling opted to install a new miniature railroad instead of reopening the old one. The old miniature railroad was dismantled and sold by Sterling to the Clifford Township Volunteer Fire Company, where it has remained ever since. 2024 was its 100th year of operation.

== After the closure ==
In 1988, the park's vintage 1903 C. W. Parker carousel was sold at auction for $220,000 as the park's facilities were being dismantled. The Antique Cars were sold to Knoebels Amusement Resort at auction in 1988, Knoebels had previously purchased the Bumper Boats in 1982. While the Bumper Boats have since been removed, the Antique Cars are still in operation. Most of the ride's original cars have been replaced with newer cars.

The local congregation of Hare Krishna attempted to purchase the Rocky Glen Park grounds so it could erect a walled "City of God" on the site. Seven hundred residents signed petitions protesting the proposed sale, which fell through as a result.
