= Figure 8 roller coaster =

Roller coaster layout

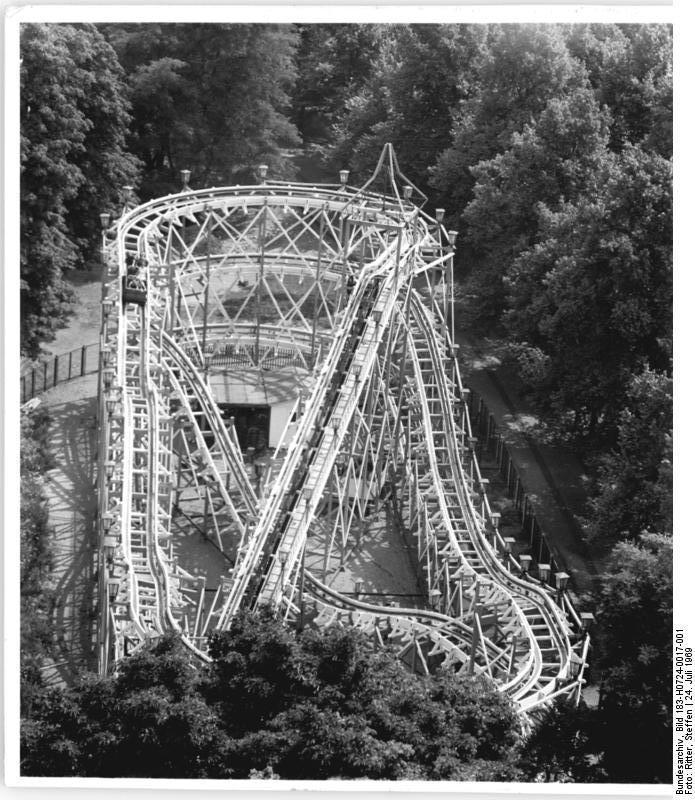
A figure-8 coaster at Kulturpark Rotehorn in Magdeburg, Germany, 1969.

Figure 8 roller coasters are a category of roller coasters where the train runs through a figure 8 shaped course before returning to the boarding station. This design was one of the first designs to be featured in roller coaster design, along with the out and back roller coaster. The figure 8 design allowed for more turns than the out and back design, offering riders an alternative experience.

An early and famous example of a Figure 8 is the Leap the Dips at Lakemont Park, in Altoona, Pennsylvania.

Many figure 8 roller coasters carry the name "Figure 8."

== Layout ==
In a figure 8 track layout, the track crosses over itself, forming an "8" shape.

The double figure eight is a variation where the track contains two separate figure-eight shapes. Some examples include the Cobra at Six Flags Discovery Kingdom and the Harley Quinn Crazy Train at Six Flags Great Adventure.

Early figure 8 coasters were typically wooden side friction coasters, where the train was brought to the top of the track via chain lift and then descended through gravitational pull. Modern coasters can be made out of wood or steel, and may incorporate different launch mechanisms or train configurations to enhance the ride experience.

== History ==
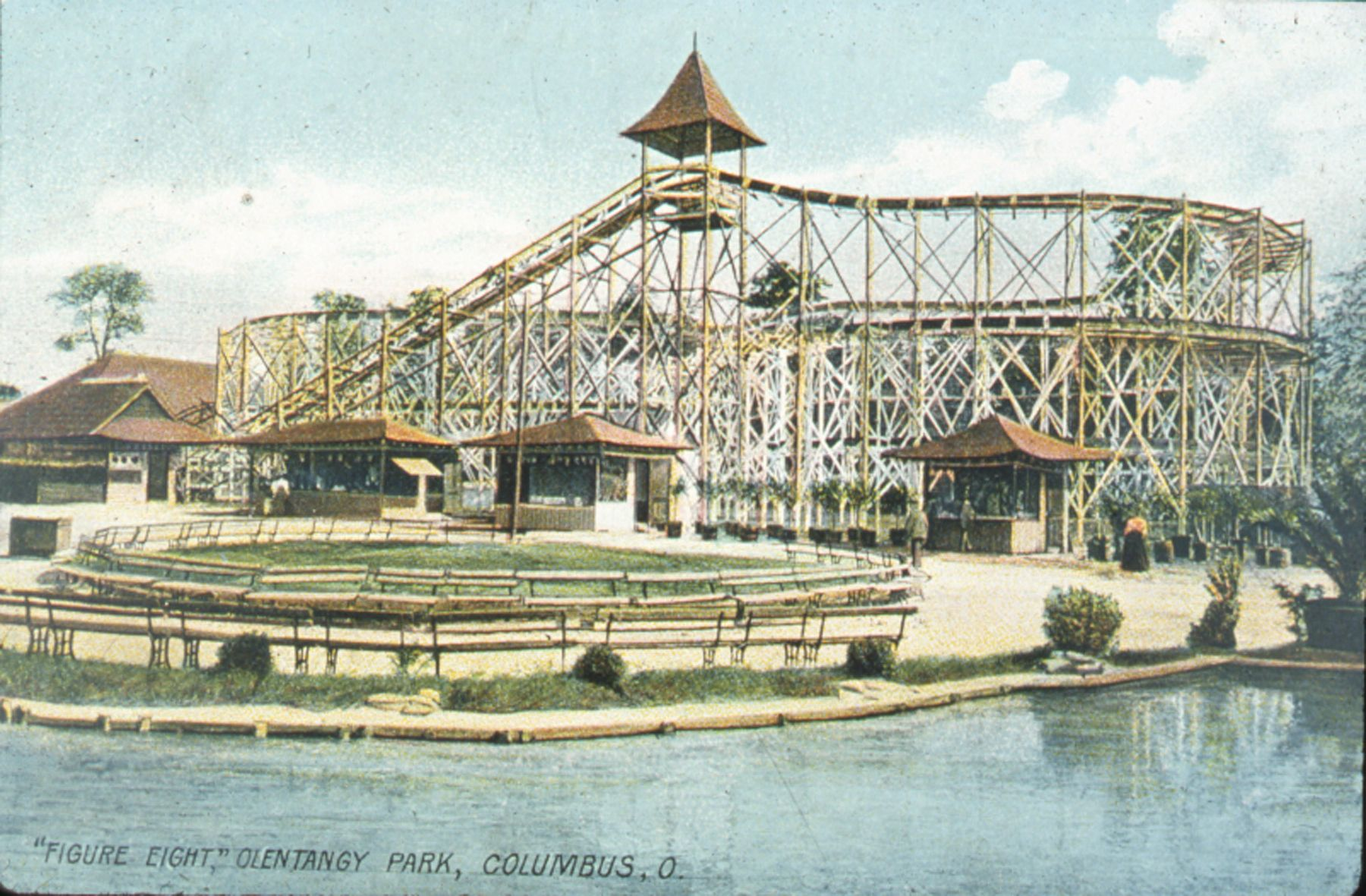
Postcard of the Figure Eight at Olentangy Park, located in Columbus, Ohio. The coaster opened in 1902.

Figure 8 coasters date back to the late 19th century. Many roller coasters of the time used out-and-back tracks, and the figure 8 layout became a standard design that provided the rider with more turns during the descent. Like many coasters of the time, figure 8 coasters were slow moving, often capping at speeds of 6 miles per hour (9.7 km/h).

While the track design was a popular alternative to typical out-and-back tracks at the start of the 20th century, interest plummeted in the following decades. They were often dismantled in favor of faster coasters, being viewed as less exciting than the new designs of the time. The Leap the Dips coaster at Lakemont Park, located in Altoona, Pennsylvania, is believed to be the oldest surviving side friction figure 8 coaster.

== Figure 8 roller coasters ==
An Incomplete List of Figure 8 roller coasters

Name	Park	Location	Year opened	Status
Achterbahn	Skyline Park	Bad Wörishofen, Bavaria, Germany	1999	Defunct (2014)
Antelope	Gulliver's Warrington	Warrington, Cheshire, England, UK		
Figure 8	Euclid Beach Park	Cleveland, Ohio	1904	Defunct (1909)
Figure 8	Athletic Park	New Orleans, Louisiana		Defunct
Figure 8	Canobie Lake Park	Salem, New Hampshire	1902	Defunct (1933)
Figure 8	Capital Beach Park	Lincoln, Nebraska	1906	Defunct (1917)
Figure 8	Cascade Park	New Castle, Pennsylvania	1903	Defunct (1921)
Figure 8	Columbia Gardens	Butte, Montana	1906	Defunct (1915)
Figure 8	Coney Island	Cincinnati, Ohio		Defunct (1918)
Figure 8	Crystal Beach Park	Crystal Beach, Ontario, Canada	1905	Defunct (1915)
Figure 8	Eldridge Park	Elmira, New York	1903	Defunct
Figure 8	Greater Island Park	Easton, Pennsylvania	1905-1906	Defunct (1919)
Figure 8	Hague Park	Jackson, Michigan		Defunct
Figure 8	Happyland Park	Vancouver, British Columbia, Canada	1906	Defunct (1911)
Figure 8	Harlem Park	Rockford, Illinois	1905	Defunct
Figure 8	Hazle Park	West Hazleton, Pennsylvania	1905	Defunct (1922)
Figure 8	Hocus Pocus Park	Knoxville, Tennessee	1913	Defunct (1922)
Figure 8	Indianola Park	Columbus, Ohio		Defunct
Figure 8	Lakeside Park	Flint, Michigan	1912	Defunct (1920)
Figure 8	Luna Park	Seattle, Washington	1907	Defunct (1913)
Figure 8	Natatorium Park	Spokane, Washington	1906	Defunct (1916)
Figure 8	Oakford Park	Jeannette, Pennsylvania	1904	Defunct
Figure 8	Ocean View Amusement Park	Norfolk, Virginia		Defunct
Figure 8	Olentangy Park	Columbus, Ohio	1902	Defunct (1937)
Figure 8	Olympic Park	Irvington, New Jersey	1905	Defunct (1920)
Figure 8	Palisades Amusement Park	Cliffside Park, New Jersey	1908	Defunct
Figure 8	Phalen Park	St. Paul, Minnesota		Defunct
Figure 8	Pine Island Park	Manchester, New Hampshire		Defunct
Figure 8	Ramona Park	Grand Rapids, Michigan	1903	Defunct (1913)
Figure 8	Riverside Park	Saginaw, Michigan	1903	Defunct
Figure 8	Rocky Glen Park	Moosic, Pennsylvania	1905	Defunct (1936)
Figure 8	Rocky Springs Park	Lancaster, Pennsylvania	1906	Defunct (1917)
Figure 8	South Haven Amusement Park	South Haven, Michigan		Defunct
Figure 8	Stanley Beach	Port Stanley, Ontario, Canada		Defunct
Figure 8	Stanton Park	Steubenville, Ohio	1905	Defunct (1912)
Figure 8	Steeplechase Park	Brooklyn, New York	1908	Defunct
Figure 8	Watch Tower Amusement Park	Rock Island, Illinois	1905	Defunct (1914)
Figure 8	Waukesha Beach	Pewaukee, Wisconsin	1910	Defunct
Figure 8	West View Park	West View, Pennsylvania	1909	Defunct (1926)
Figure 8	White City	Bellingham, Washington		Defunct
Figure 8	White City	Oshkosh, Wisconsin	1906	Defunct
Figure 8	White City	Sheboygan, Wisconsin		Defunct
Figure 8	White City	Vancouver, British Columbia, Canada		Defunct
Figure 8	Wolff's Park	Detroit, Michigan		
Figure 8 Toboggan	Idora Park	Oakland, California	1906	Defunct (1916)
Flying Fish	Thorpe Park	Surrey, England		
Gemini	Cedar Point	Sandusky, Ohio		Operating
Ghoster Coaster	Canada's Wonderland	Vaughan, Ontario, Canada		Operating
Grizzly	Kings Dominion	Doswell, Virginia		Operating
Leap The Dips	Lakemont Park	Altoona, Pennsylvania		Operating
Little Dipper	Six Flags Great America	Gurnee, Illinois		Operating
Meteor	Little Amerricka	Marshall, Wisconsin		Operating
Phoenix	Knoebels Amusement Resort	Elysburg, Pennsylvania		Operating
Racer	Kennywood	West Mifflin, Pennsylvania		Operating
Runaway Train	Chessington World of Adventures	Chessington, Greater London, United Kingdom		Defunct (2022)
Scorpion	Busch Gardens Tampa Bay	Tampa, Florida		Defunct (2024)
Sea Dragon	Rides At Adventure Cove	Powell, Ohio		Operating
Thunderbolt	Six Flags New England	Springfield, Massachusetts	1941	Operating
Wild Beast	Canada's Wonderland	Vaughan, Ontario, Canada	1981	Operating
Wildcat	Cedar Point	Sandusky, Ohio	1979	Defunct (2011)
Woodstock Express	Carowinds	Charlotte, North Carolina Fort Mill, South Carolina	1975	Operating
Woodstock Express	Kings Dominion	Doswell, Virginia	1974	Operating
Woodstock Express	Kings Island	Mason, Ohio	1972	Operating
