= Luna Park, Cleveland =

Former amusement park in Cleveland, Ohio

Coordinates: 41°29′23″N 81°36′42″W

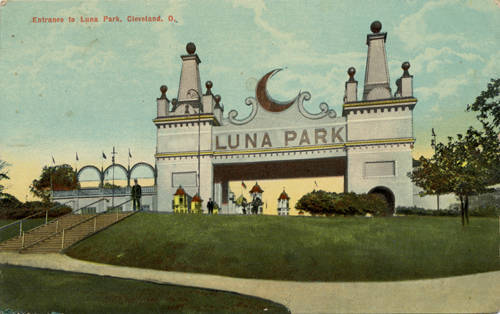
Post card (~1910) picture of the main entrance of Luna Park, Cleveland.

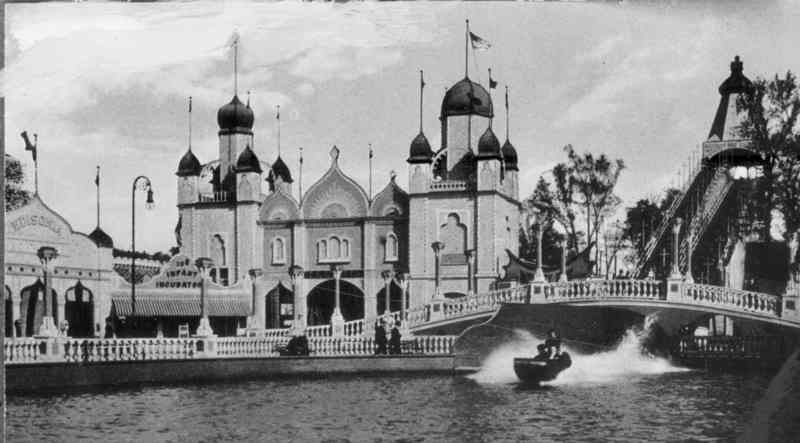
View of Luna Park, Cleveland's shoot-the-chutes ride, ca. 1910. Note the sign for the "10¢ Infant Incubators" in the background.

Luna Park was a trolley park (a type of amusement park) in Cleveland, Ohio, from 1905 to 1929.

== Specifications ==
Constructed by Frederick Ingersoll, the park occupied a hilly 35-acre (140,000 m^{2}) site bounded by Woodland Avenue, Woodhill, Mt. Carmel (originally Ingersoll Road), and East 110th Street and included roller coasters, carousels, a fun house, a Ferris wheel, a roller rink, a shoot-the-chutes ride, a concert shell, a dance hall, bumper cars, a baseball field, and a 20,000-seat stadium (unofficially called "Luna Bowl", destroyed by fire in August, 1929Clipped From The Akron Beacon Journal) in which American football was played.

On May 18, 1905, Cleveland's Luna Park became the second Ingersoll park of that name (out of 44) to have opened before his death in 1927, and the second amusement park (after Luna Park, Pittsburgh, which opened weeks earlier) to be covered with electrical lighting.

== History ==
The monetary demands of upgrading and maintaining his embryonic chain of amusement parks forced Ingersoll, the original owner of Cleveland's Luna Park, to declare bankruptcy in 1908; Ingersoll was forced to sell his Cleveland park to Matthew Bramley, an original investor in (and, later, owner of) Ingersoll's Luna Park Amusement Company who built the Cleveland Trinidad Paving Company into the largest paving company in the world. Bramley added rides to Luna Park as its popularity as a trolley park grew, in part because beer was sold on the park grounds.

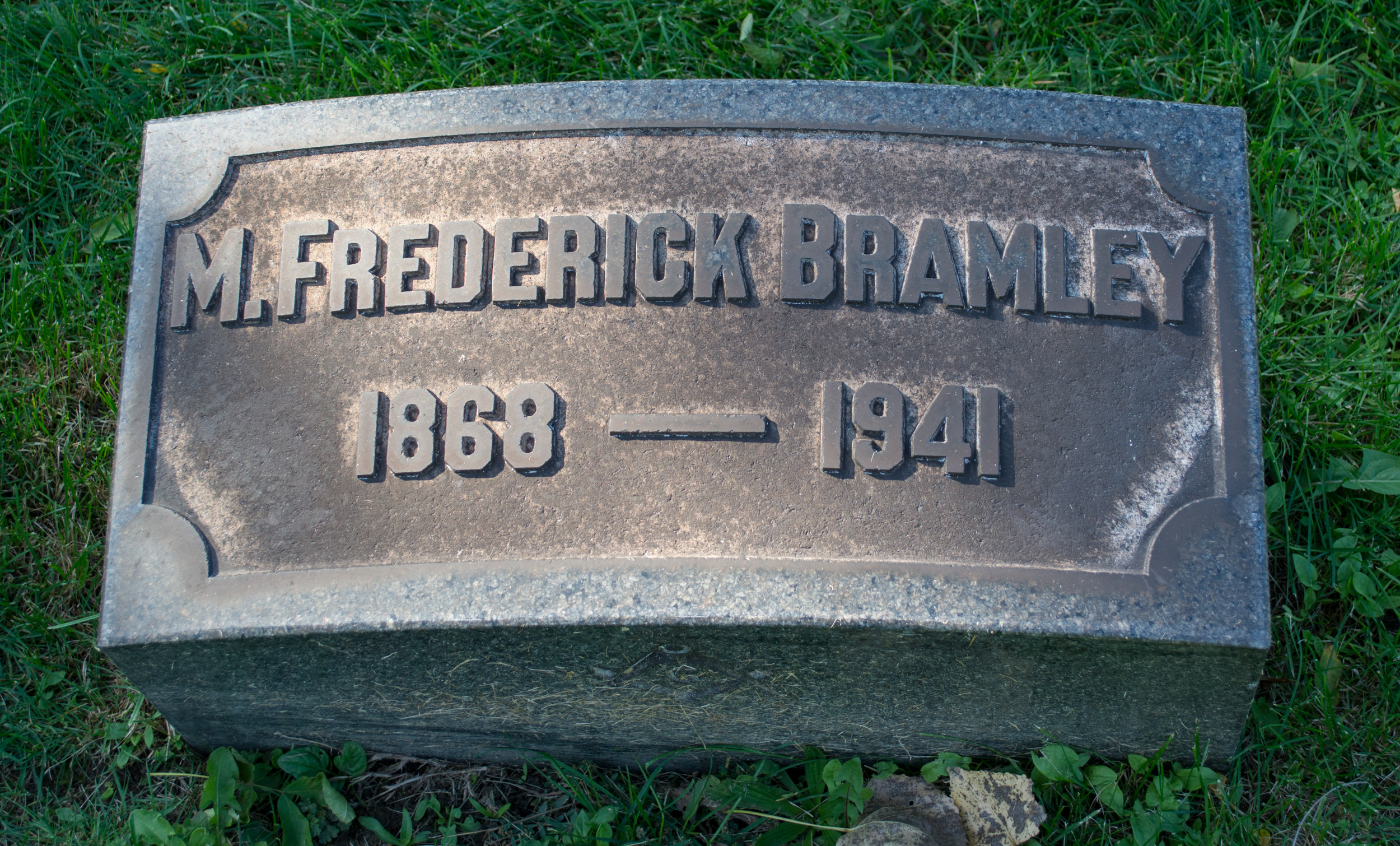
Matthew Frederick Bramley grave at Riverside Cemetery in Cleveland

After the passage of the Eighteenth Amendment to the United States Constitution and the beginning of Prohibition (1920), a primary source of revenue was removed as the park's popularity waned. Bramley officially closed the gates to Luna Park in 1929 for the final time. The park was beset with incidences of arson, including the fire that destroyed the football stadium, and most of the rides were dismantled and moved to other amusement parks in the early 1930s. In June 1939, construction crews broke ground for a new housing development project to be built on the grounds where Luna Park once stood. Woodhill Homes was completed on November 1, 1940, making it one of the nation's first public housing projects.

== Luna Bowl tenants ==
The stadium at Luna Park The Cleveland Panthers of the first American Football League and the Cleveland Bulldogs of the National Football League played their home games in Luna Bowl, and (after the dismantling of the amusement rides had begun) the Federal League Cleveland Green Sox, Luna Bowl was the home to Negro league baseball teams Cleveland Tigers (1928) Cleveland Stars (1932), Cleveland Giants (1933), and Cleveland Red Sox (1934).

Collegiately, Case School of Applied Science defeated Western Reserve University 7–6 on November 19, 1927, during their annual rivalry football game, played only once at Luna Park. The winning touchdown was scored by Case's Frank Herzegh.

== Woodland Rink ==
The roller rink was added to Luna Park when the park was sold to Matthew Bramley in 1910. The roller rink was known as the Woodland Rink. On December 12, 1938, the last vestige of the park, the skating rink, was destroyed by fire.
