= Luna Park, Pittsburgh =

Former amusement park in Pittsburgh, Pennsylvania

Luna Park
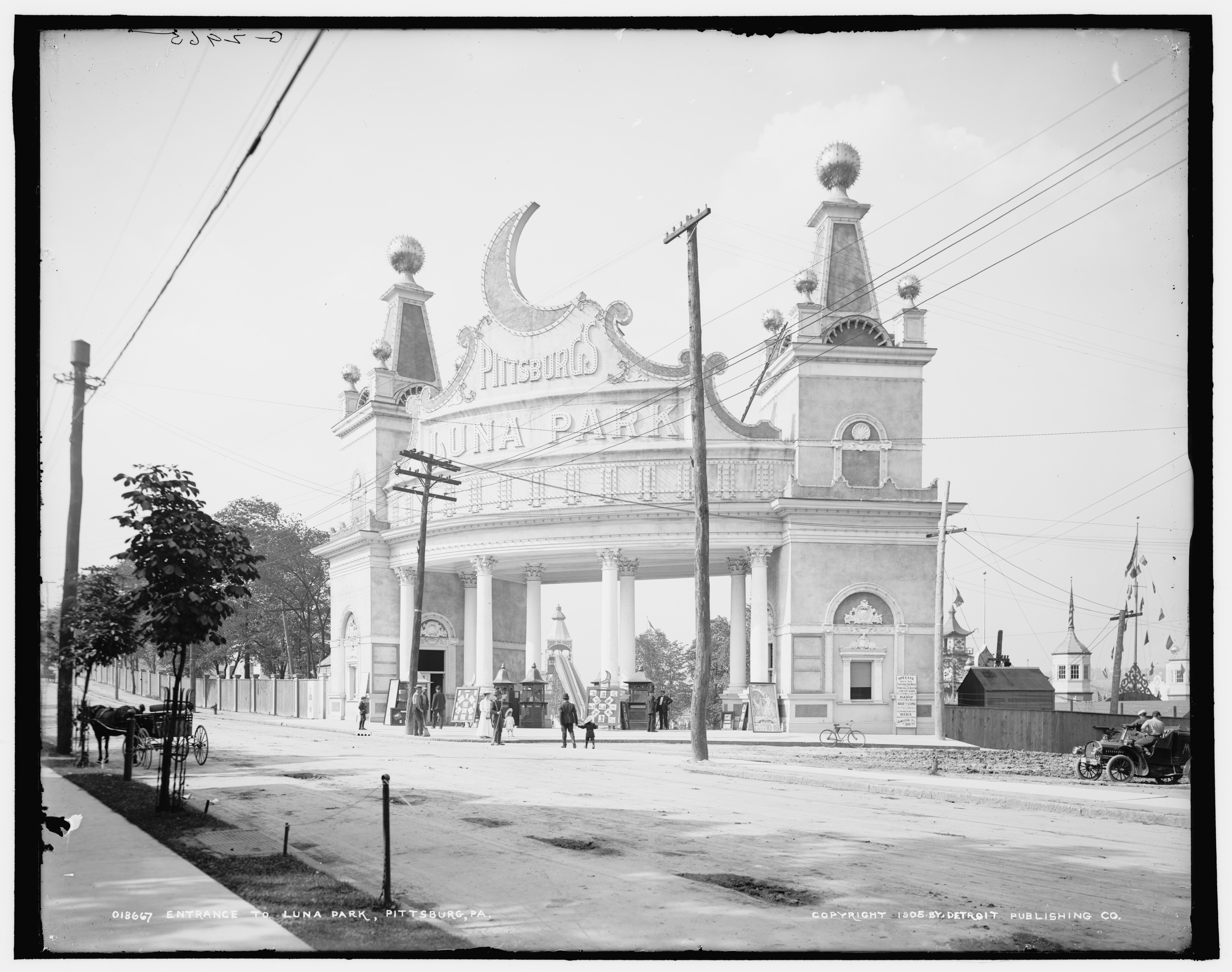
- The entrance to the park
- Interactive map of Luna Park
- Location: Pittsburgh, Pennsylvania
- Coordinates: 40.4551°N 79.9528°W
- Status: Defunct
- Opened: 1905
- Closed: 1909
- Owner: Frederick Ingersoll
- Area: 16 acres (6.5 ha)

Luna Park was an amusement park in Pittsburgh, Pennsylvania that operated from 1905 to 1909. Constructed and owned by Frederick Ingersoll, the park occupied a 16 acre hilly site bounded on the south by Atlantic Avenue (now Baum Boulevard) and on the west by Craig Street, and included many rides and amusements.

== History ==
Pittsburgh's Luna Park was the first Ingersoll-owned park of the name, out of 44. The park cost $375,000 to construct. It was the first amusement park to be covered with electrical lighting (67,000 light bulbs).

The Pittsburgh Luna Park, alongside its sister park, Luna Park Cleveland, were the beginnings of the world's first amusement park chain. By 1929, two years after Ingersoll's death, 44 parks of the Luna Park name were in operation around the world. Only a few of these parks still operate today, including one in Mexico City, one in Athens, and one in Melbourne.

Luna Park offered many different attractions, including roller coasters, picnic pavilions, a carousel, a fun house, a Ferris wheel, a roller rink, a shoot-the-chutes ride, bumper cars, a concert shell, a dance hall, and a baby incubator exhibit. In its brief existence, the park featured regular performances of bands, acrobatic acts, animal acts, horse riders, and aerial acts.

On August 28, 1907, a 65-year-old woman died following a lion attack at Luna Park. Two lions escaped, one of whom mauled the woman near the Mystic River ride. She was badly injured and soon died of shock. Two policemen responded by killing the animal. A park attendant was also injured, and was later arrested and blamed for the incident.

The cost of upgrading and maintaining his amusement parks proved to be too much for Ingersoll to handle, as he declared bankruptcy in 1908. Several of his parks were sold to others. Pittsburgh's Luna Park was closed in 1909 in the wake of the lion incident and in the face of competition from a second trolley park nearby, Kennywood Park.

When Kennywood expanded its fairgrounds in 1995, its new Lost Kennywood section was inspired by its former competitor. It centered on a shoot-the-chutes ride. and featured a one-third-scale replica of the Luna Park entrance as a gateway to that section of the park, including an era-appropriate spelling of "Pittsburg".

Aside from the aforementioned tribute at Kennywood, no other remnants of Pittsburgh's Luna Park exist, notably due to a lack of historical markers. The site itself is currently a mixed-use property with both residential buildings and commercial businesses.
