= Shoot the chute =

Type of amusement ride

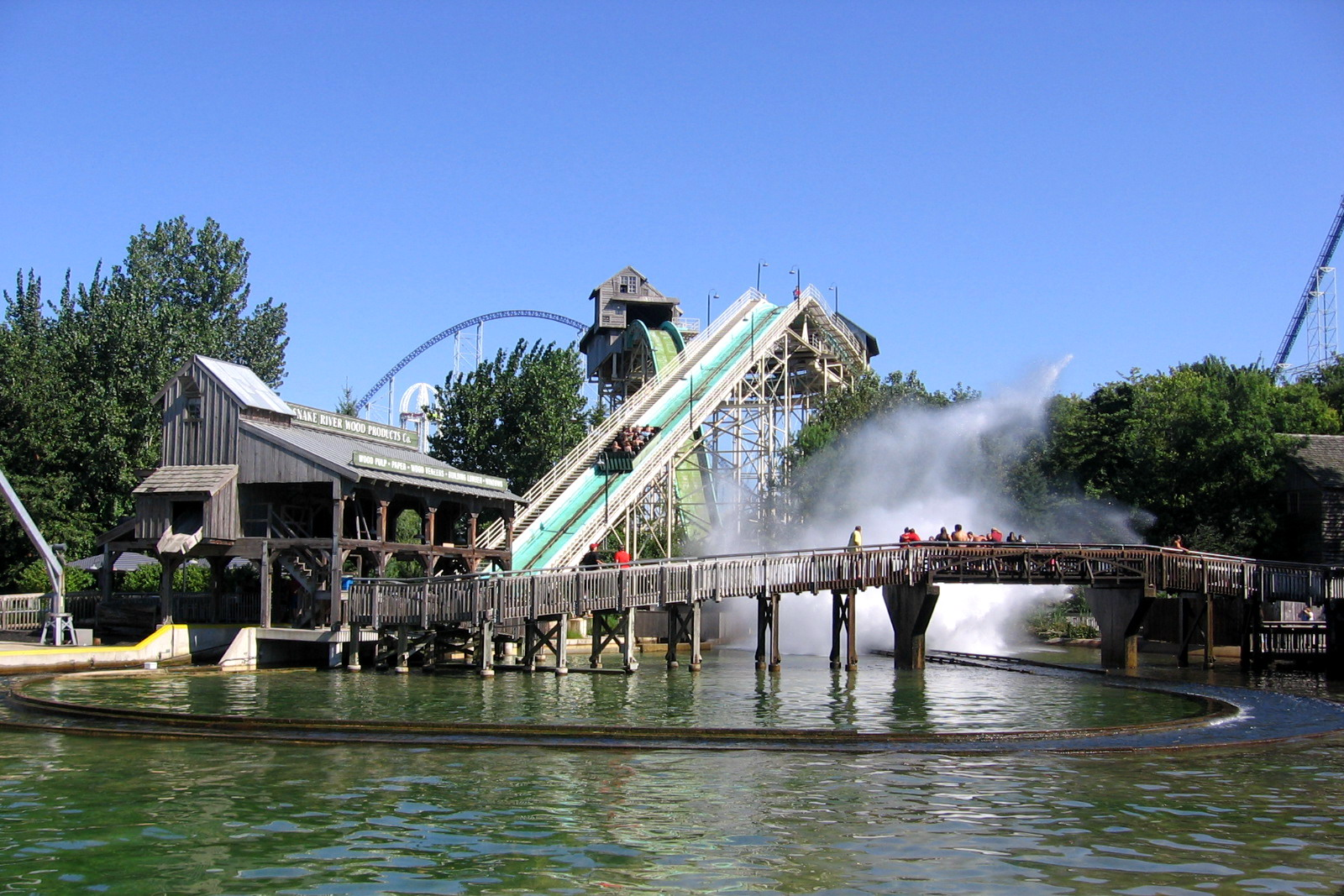
The former Snake River Falls at Cedar Point, Sandusky, Ohio, which closed September 2, 2024.

Shoot the chute is a water-based amusement ride consisting of a flat-bottomed boat that slides down a ramp or inside a flume into a lagoon. Unlike a log flume, which generally seats up to eight passengers, a modern-day shoot the chute ride generally has larger boats seating at least four across.

== History ==
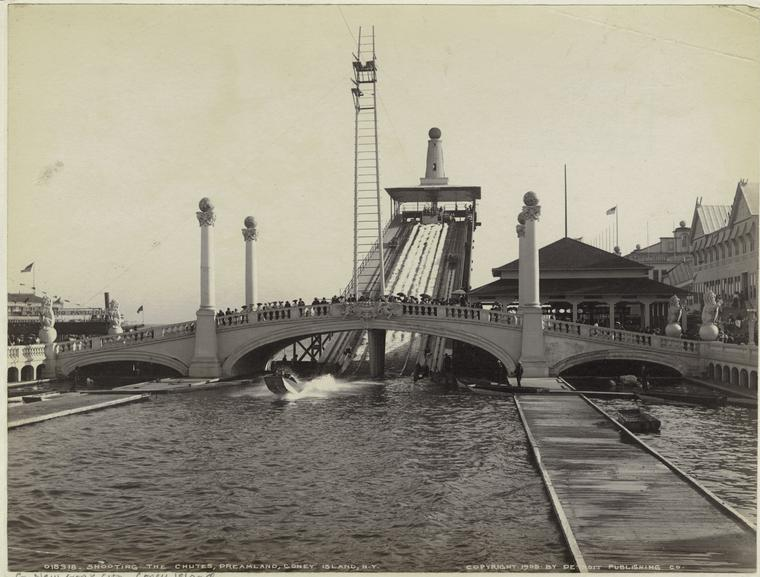
Shooting the Chutes at Coney Island's Dreamland, 1905

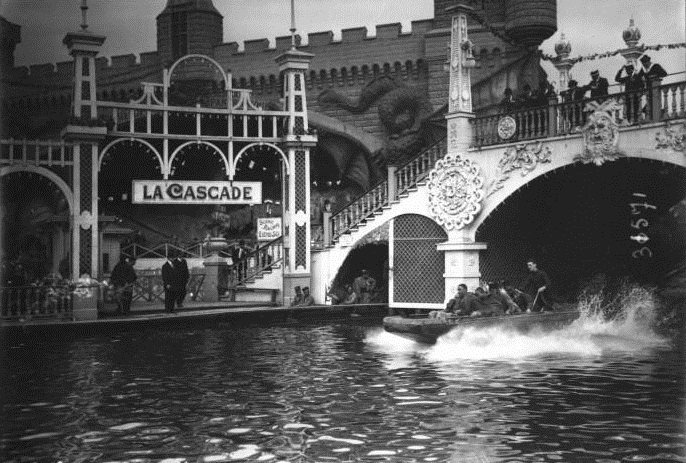
La Cascade at Magic-City in Paris, 1913

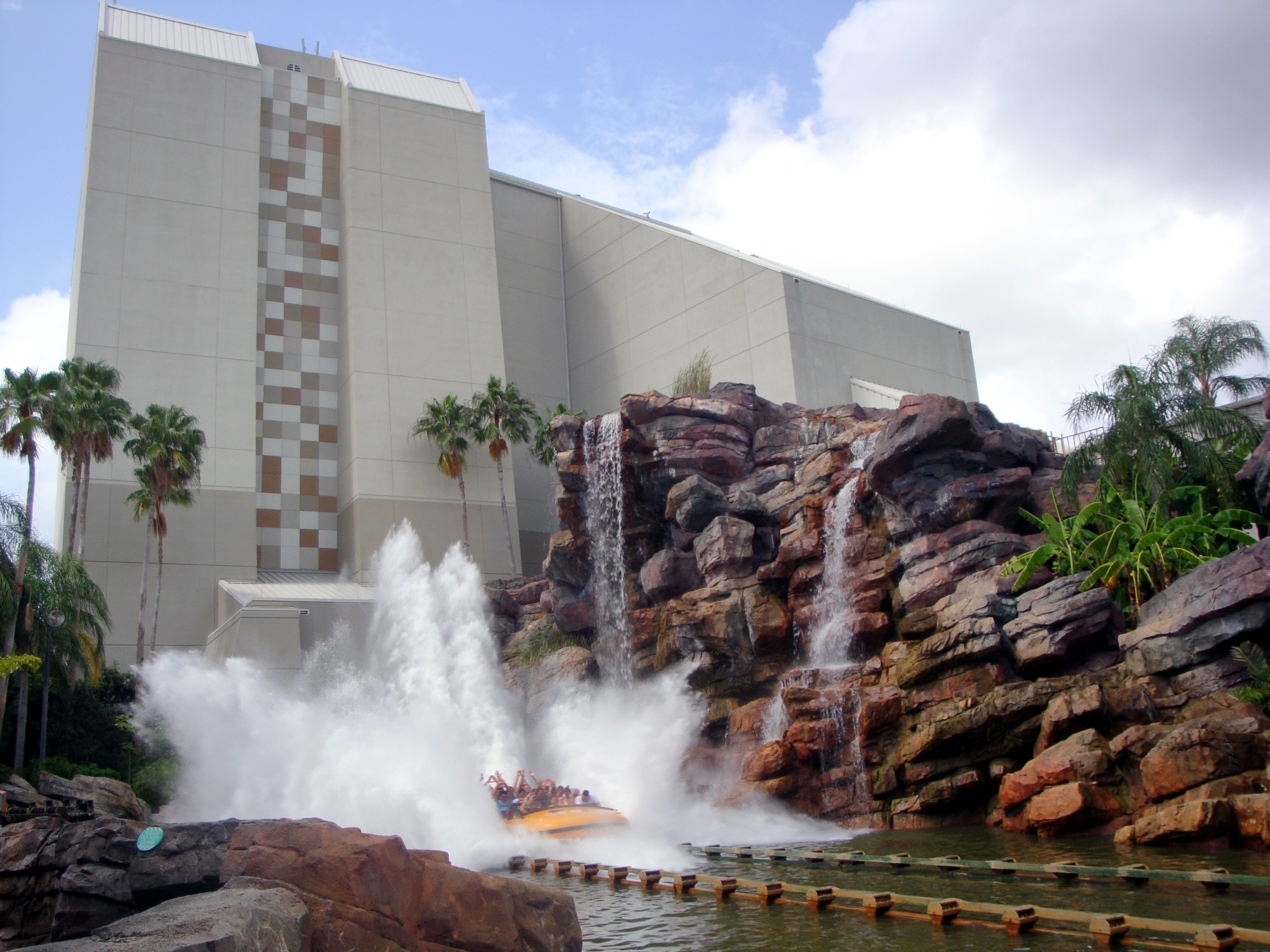
Jurassic Park River Adventure at Universal Islands of Adventure in Orlando

Urban theorist Lewis Mumford writes that, just as the pleasure garden allowed commoners to simulate palace life, "the aristocratic love of speed" (enabled by the increasing orientation of the city towards horse traffic) was sold to the public through the "promenade aerienne, or chute-the-chutes."

The first of this type of amusement ride was built by J.P. Newburg in 1884 down the side of a hill at Watchtower Park in Rock Island, Illinois. The ride traveled along a 500-foot (150 m) greased wooden track, skipping across the Rock River at the bottom. It was then pulled back to the ramp by an onboard ride attendant. Newburg took this unique ride concept next to Chicago, where more flumes were built and the rides grew in popularity.

Paul Boyton opened Paul Boyton's Water Chute, America's first modern amusement park, at 63rd and Drexel in Chicago, on July 4, 1894. Boyton's was the first amusement park to rely solely on mechanical attractions. Paul Boyton and Thomas Polk built another example in 1895 for Sea Lion Park at Coney Island. The ride was widely copied and "chute" rides were found at many amusement parks throughout the United States,

On the earliest chute rides, the flat-bottomed boat was pulled up the ramp by cable, sometimes with a turnaround on a small turntable. In the ride at Sea Lion Park, the passengers arrived at the top by elevator. The bottom of the ramp curved upwards, causing the boat to skip across the water until it came to a stop. The boat was guided to a landing by a boatman on board. The oldest ride of this type still in operation is the boat chute constructed in 1926 and 1927 located at Lake Winnepesaukah Amusement Park in Rossville, Georgia, near Chattanooga, Tennessee. An operating modern reproduction of the Luna Park shoot the chute ride of the early 20th century, The Pittsburg Plunge, is currently in operation at Kennywood amusement park in Pennsylvania.

Water chutes were also a popular attraction in the United Kingdom in the late-19th and early-20th centuries, with large multi-chute examples built at Blackpool, the Bradford Exhibition, Earls Court Exhibition Centre, and Southport, all now demolished. Smaller single-chute versions are extant and operating at East Park, Kingston upon Hull, Peasholm Park, Scarborough, and Wicksteed Park, Kettering. A large single chute ride was built at the Battersea Park funfair – now demolished – and was an integral park of a chase sequence in the 1959 Dial 999 episode "Inside Job".

== Modern rides ==
The shoot the chute concept has evolved over time in the amusement park industry. All modern shoot the chute rides feature a guide track after the descent down the chute into the pool of water that allows the boats to return to the loading platform—completing a closed-circuit track. Most modern shoot the chute rides usually consist of (though not limited to) an oval-shaped layout or a figure-eight layout. Many shoot the chute installations also have an observation platform or bridge so that spectators, in addition to riders, can get wet from the splash created by the boats.

Hopkins Rides built many 50-foot-tall (15 m) shoot the chute rides in the 1980s, and in 1994 completed Tidal Force at Hersheypark, then billed as the tallest such ride in the world. The force of the wave of water hitting the bridge caused several minor injuries to guests, necessitating clear plastic barriers being installed.

Intamin took the shoot the chute concept further in 2000 with the opening of its first Mega Splash, Perilous Plunge at Knott's Berry Farm. At its opening, it was the tallest and steepest water flume ride in the world. Three seven-ton 24-passenger boats would climb a 121-foot (37 m) lift hill, round a curve, and descend a 115-foot (35 m) water chute at a 77.8 degree slope. Upon landing in the lagoon below, the boats created a 45-foot-high (14 m) splash that drenched riders and spectators standing on an observation bridge overlooking the ride. The ride used an adjustable electromagnetic braking system to control the volume of the splash. A similar ride, Hydro, was later constructed at Oakwood Theme Park in Wales, UK. Perilous Plunge was removed from the park in 2012.

Schlitterbahn in Corpus Christi, Texas, opened "Padre Plunge" in May 2017. This ride previously stood at Alabama Splash Adventure where it was known as "Buzzsaw Falls". It was damaged by Hurricane Harvey three months later and the ride permanently closed to the public. It was demolished in March 2020.

Holiday World & Splashin' Safari in Santa Claus, Indiana, built an even larger shoot the chute ride named Pilgrims Plunge. Designed and built by Intamin and dubbed a Hyper Splash, it was, at its opening, the world's tallest water ride, with a top speed of 50 miles per hour (80 km/h). Pilgrims Plunge featured a 135-foot (41 m) open elevator lift leading to a 131-foot (40 m) drop at a 45 degree angle that would propel the boat to speeds approaching 50 miles per hour (80 km/h). Pilgrims Plunge opened for the 2009 season and was featured on a segment of the Travel Channel's Extreme series. It was renamed Giraffica for the 2013 season and removed in April 2014 due to downtime and reliability issues.

== Notable manufacturers ==
- Arrow Dynamics
- Hopkins Rides
- WhiteWater West
