= Trolley park =

Amusement park prototype

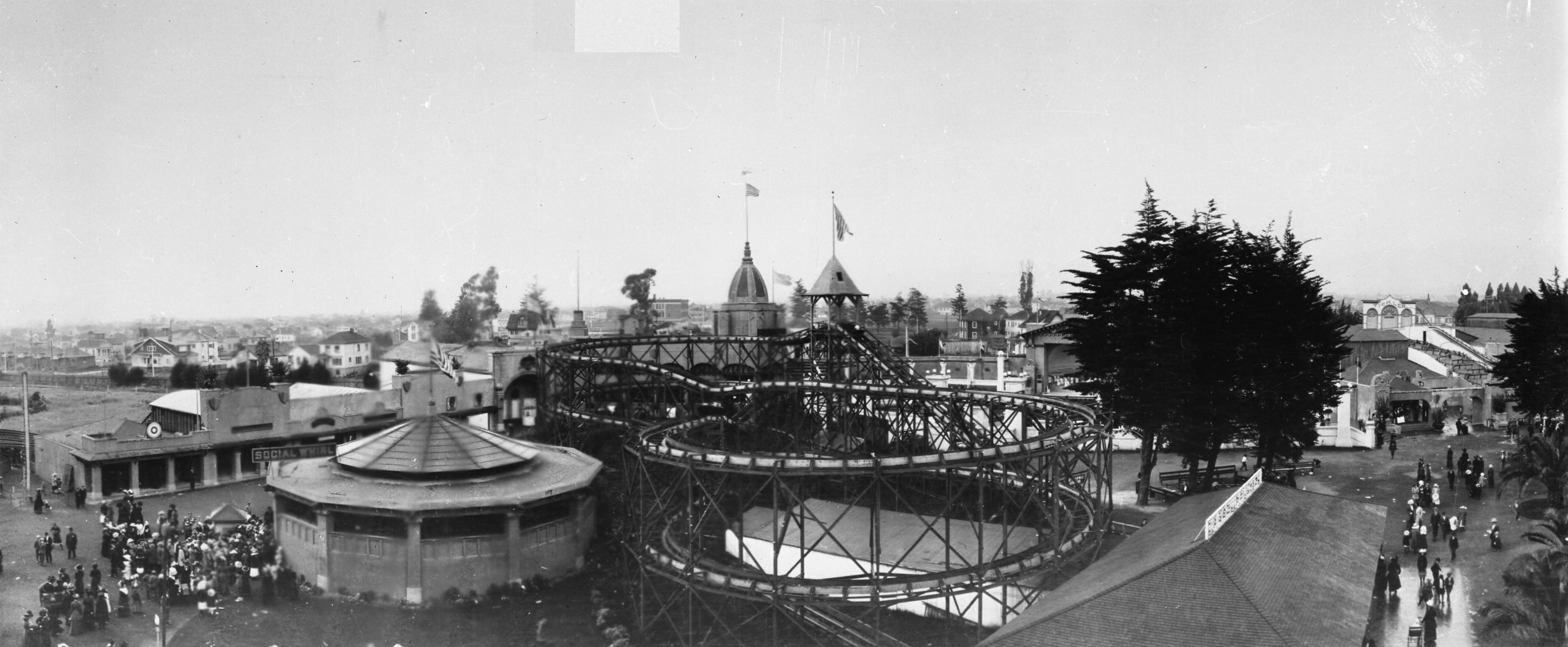
The end of the trolley line in Idora Park in Oakland, California, in 1910

In the United States, trolley parks, which started in the 19th century, were picnic and recreation areas along or at the ends of streetcar lines in most of the larger cities. These were precursors to amusement parks. Trolley parks were often created by the streetcar companies to give people a reason to use their services on weekends.

The parks originally consisted of picnic groves and pavilions, and often held events such as dances, concerts and fireworks. Many eventually added features such as swimming pools, carousels, Ferris wheels, roller coasters, sports fields, boats rides, restaurants and other resort facilities to become amusement parks. Various sources report the existence of between 1,500 and 2,000 amusement parks in the United States by 1919.

== History ==
=== Coney Island ===
One such location was Coney Island in Brooklyn, New York City, where in 1829 a horse-drawn streetcar line began to bring pleasure seekers to the beach. In 1875, a million passengers rode the railroad to Coney Island; the next year doubled that. Hotels and amusements were built to accommodate the upper classes and the working class. The first carousel was installed in the 1870s, the first Switchback Railway roller coaster in 1881. In 1895, the first permanent amusement park in North America opened in Coney Island: Sea Lion Park, which was also one of the first parks to charge admission for entrance, not just tickets for individual rides.

In 1897, it was joined by Steeplechase Park, the first of three major amusement parks that would open in the area. George Tilyou designed the park to provide thrills and sweep away the restraints of the Victorian crowds. The combination of the nearby population center of New York City and the ease of access to the area made Coney Island the embodiment of the American amusement park. It was later joined by Luna Park in 1903 and Dreamland in 1904. Coney Island was a huge success, and by 1910 attendance on a Sunday could reach a million people.

=== Heyday ===
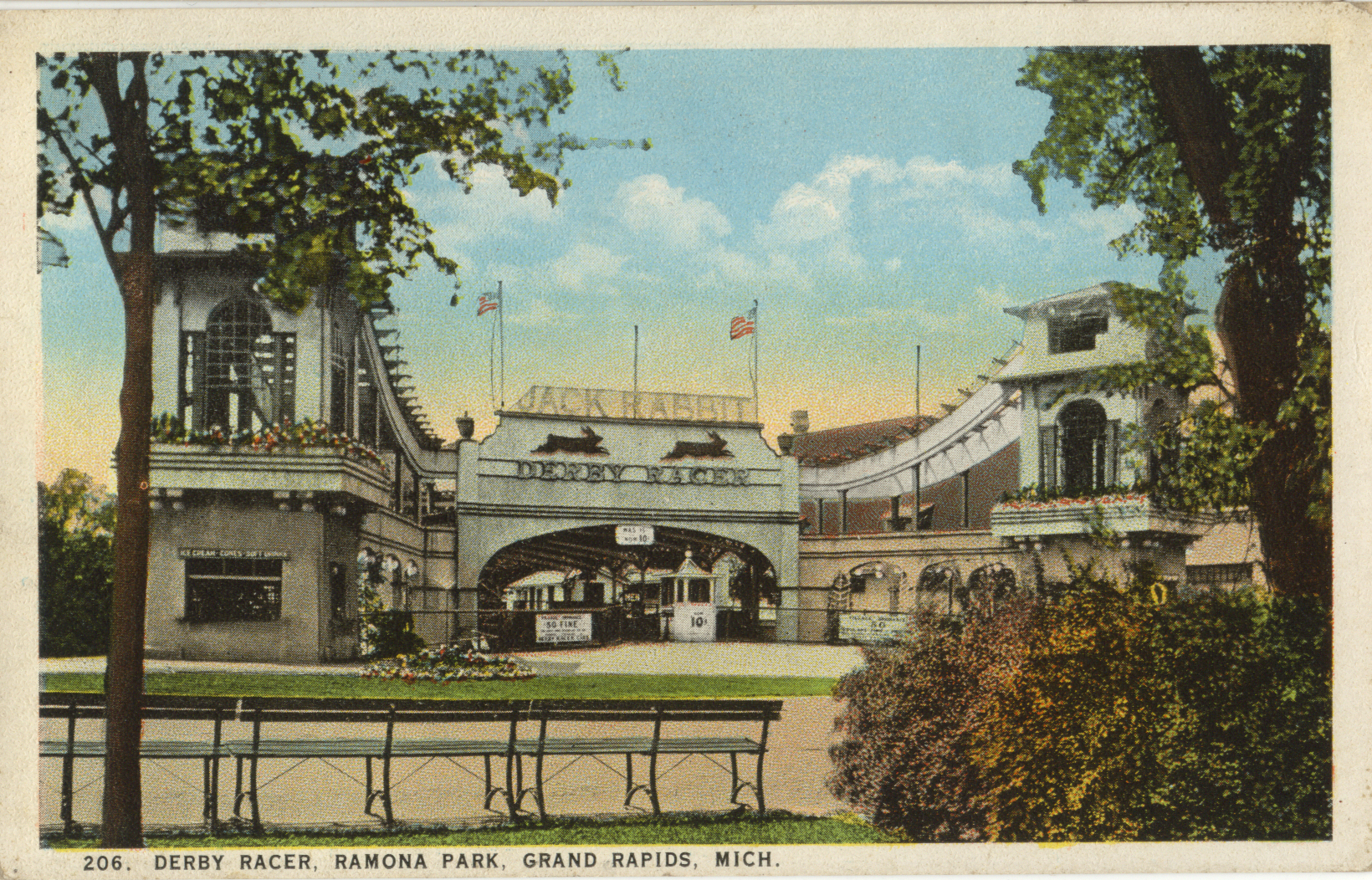
The Jack Rabbit Derby Racer at Ramona Park, a trolley park in East Grand Rapids, Michigan. The park closed in 1955.

The "golden era" of trolley parks began in the early 20th century, by which time there were hundreds of amusement parks, many of them starting as trolley parks, in operation around the United States. Every major city boasted one or more parks, often based on (or named after) Coney Island, Luna Park, or Dreamland. The era saw the typical workweek shrink and the amount of disposable income rose. The amusement parks reflected the mechanization and efficiency of industrialization, while serving as a source of fantasy and escape from real life.

=== Decline ===
Attendance at urban trolley parks generally declined in the 1920s. Changing demographics in the urban areas also played a role. So did the rise of the automobile in American life. Although the automobile provided people with more options for satisfying their entertainment needs, amusement parks that were accessible by car continued to be successful and new parks were developed.

By the end of the 1920s, amusement parks had suffered steep declines for various reasons, particularly the Great Depression.

== Extant trolley parks ==
Of the 15 parks serviced by trolley in the 1900s and still in operation today, only ten of them remain true amusement trolley parks. One park predates the invention of the trolley by decades, one park requested trolley services come to them, two parks no longer operate any amusement rides and instead serve as music venues and arts centers, and one park has only ever existed as a music venue and arts center.

Park	Location	Opened	Associated trolley company	Park status	Notes
Bushkill Park	Easton, Pennsylvania	1902	Unknown	Operating	
Camden Park	Huntington, West Virginia	1903	Camden Interstate Railway Company	Operating	
Canobie Lake Park	Salem, New Hampshire	1902	Massachusetts Northeast Street Railway Company	Operating	
Dorney Park & Wildwater Kingdom	Allentown, Pennsylvania	1884	Allentown-Kutztown Traction Company	Operating	
Kennywood	Pittsburgh, Pennsylvania	1898	Monongahela Street Railways Company	Operating	Designated a National Historic Landmark
Lake Compounce	Bristol, Connecticut	1846	Unknown	Not a true trolley park	Although Lake Compounce is the oldest operating amusement park in the United States, it is not a trolley park. It did have trolley service for a time, but the park had been in operation for forty years before the trolley was invented, and it was never owned or operated by a trolley company.
Lakemont Park	Altoona, Pennsylvania	1894	Altoona & Logan Valley Electric Railway	Amusement rides not operating	Home to the oldest roller coaster in the world, Leap-The-Dips. The park's amusement rides have not operated since 2023, though its other public park features have remained available.
Lakeside Amusement Park	Denver, Colorado	1907	Denver Tramway	Not a true trolley park	According to the book Denver's Lakeside Amusement Park, the park was developed as a separate company who then encouraged the Denver Tramway to extend a line to the park. It was closely linked to the trolley line, but was not a true trolley park.
Midway State Park	Maple Springs, New York	1898	Jamestown and Lake Erie Railway	Operating	
Oaks Amusement Park	Portland, Oregon	1905	Oregon Water Power and Railway Company	Operating	
Quassy Amusement Park	Middlebury, Connecticut	1908	Unknown	Operating	
Ravinia Park	Highland Park, Illinois	1904	Chicago and Milwaukee Electric Railroad	No amusement rides	The park was never an amusement park, it was instead a music venue and arts center
Seabreeze Amusement Park	Rochester, New York	1879	Rochester and Lake Ontario Railroad	Operating	
Waldameer & Water World	Erie, Pennsylvania	1896	Erie Electric Motor Company	Operating	
Glen Echo Park	Montgomery County, Maryland	ca.1902	Washington Railway and Electric Company	No amusement rides left	The park's carousel is the only remaining ride in operation. The park remains open as a National Park Service historic site, and an arts and cultural center. Several buildings originally used for amusement attractions have since been repurposed for other uses.

== Defunct trolley parks ==
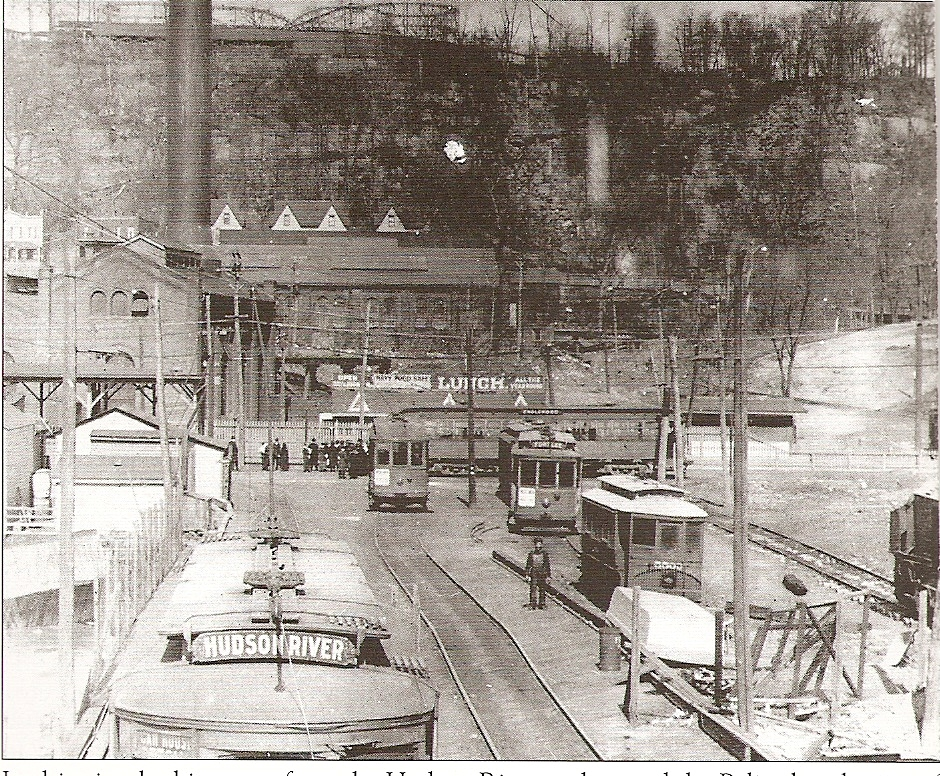
Roller coasters of Palisades Amusement Park are visible atop the Palisades, as seen from the trolley terminal in Edgewater, New Jersey, in the early 20th century

Park	Location	Opened	Closed	Trolley company	Notes
Al Fresco Amusement Park	Peoria, Illinois				
Bay Shore Park	Edgemere, Maryland (Baltimore County), Maryland (near Baltimore, Maryland	1906	1947		Some structures remain in North Point State Park
Big Island Amusement Park	Minneapolis, Minnesota	1906	1911		
Bonnie Brae Park	Phoenixville, Pennsylvania				
Braddock Heights Park	Braddock Heights, Maryland	1896	1960s	Hagerstown and Frederick Railway	
Brandywine Springs Amusement Park	Newport, Delaware	1886	1923		
Burnham Park	Burnham, Pennsylvania	ca 1903	1916		Relocated to Kishacoquillas Park
C&ST Trolley Park	Blue Island, IL	1911	1914		The site is now owned by the Cook County (IL) Forest Preserve District in use as a picnic grove.
Cascade Park	New Castle, Pennsylvania				Originally opened as Brinton Park in 1891. Cascade Park opened in 1897. While the rides are gone, the park remains as a site for community events.
Chevy Chase Lake	Chevy Chase, Maryland				
Chutes Park	Los Angeles, California	1887	1914		
Clementon Park and Splash World	Clementon, New Jersey	1907	2026	Atlantic City Railroad	Originally closed in September 2019, but reopened in 2021 after having been purchased by IB Parks & Entertainment.
Contoocook River Amusement Park	Penacook, New Hampshire	1893	1925		
Council Crest Amusement Park	Portland, Oregon	1907	1929		
Crescent Park	Riverside, Rhode Island				
Dellwood Park	Lockport, Illinois			Chicago and Joliet Electric Railway	
Dixieland Amusement Park	South Jacksonville (Jacksonville), Florida			South Jacksonville Municipal Railways	Destroyed in a hail storm
Dominion Park	Montreal, Canada	1906	1937	Montreal Suburban Tramway and Power company	Montreal Suburban Tramway was a precursor to today's publicly owned transit commission
Eldora Park	Eldora, Pennsylvania, (Carroll Township, Washington County)	1901	mid-1940s		
Electric Park	Detroit, Michigan	1906	1928		
Electric Park	Funkstown, Maryland	1897	1927	Hagerstown and Frederick Railway	
Electric Park, Kansas City	Kansas City, Kansas	1899	1925		
Electric Park	Niverville, New York	1901	1917	Albany and Hudson Railroad	"Largest amusement park on the east coast between Manhattan and Montreal"
Elkins Park	Martinsburg, West Virginia	1892	1890s	Martinsburg Street Railway	
Euclid Beach Park	Euclid, Ohio, then Cleveland, Ohio	1895	1969		When first opened, visitors came to the park on two steamers from downtown Cleveland. When the Humphrey Family took over direction of the park they agreed to discontinue boat service in return for one street car fare charge to the park from the provider. Initially a street car stop was built inside the park. (Euclid Beach Park, is Closed for the Season, 1977)
Excelsior Amusement Park	Excelsior, Minnesota	1925	1973		
Fleishhacker Pool and Zoo	San Francisco, California	1925	1971		
Fontaine Ferry Park	Louisville, Kentucky	1905	1975		
Forest Hill Park, Richmond, Virginia		1889	1932		
Forest Park	Ballston Lake, New York	1902	1927	Saratoga and Schenectady Railroad	
Forest Park	Genoa, Ohio				
Fort George Amusement Park	Manhattan, New York				
Glen Park, west of Watertown, New York	Glen Park, New York				
Glen Echo Park	Glen Echo, Maryland	early 1900s	1968		
Golden Spur Amusement Park	Niantic, Connecticut			New London and East Lyme Street Railway	
Great Falls Park	Great Falls, Virginia			Washington and Old Dominion Railway	
Highland Park	York, Pennsylvania	1891	1921		
Idora Park	Oakland, California	1904	1929		
Idora Park	Youngstown, Ohio	1899	1984		
Indian Park	Montoursville, Pennsylvania				The park remains as a site for community events.
Indianola Park	Columbus, Ohio	1905	1937		
Jantzen Beach Amusement Park	Portland, Oregon	1928	1970		
Kaydeross Park	Saratoga Springs, New York			Delaware and Hudson Railway	
Kishacoquillas Park	Between Burnham, Pennsylvania and Lewistown, Pennsylvania				Relocated from Burnham Park in 1916; property and some structures survive as community park.
Lake Lansing Amusement Park	Haslett, Michigan				Demolished 1972
Lake View Park	Sheboygan, Wisconsin				
Lakeview Park (Lake Nipmuc Amusement Park)	Mendon, Massachusetts				
Lakeview Park (Lake Mascuppic)	Dracut, Massachusetts	1889	1970s		
Lakewood Amusement	Atlanta, Georgia	1906	1985		
Lexington Park	Lexington, Massachusetts	1902	1920		
Lincoln Park	Dartmouth, Massachusetts	1894	1987		
Lincoln Park	Hallville, Connecticut			Norwich and Westerly Railway	
Luna Park	Alexandria County (now Arlington County), Virginia	1906	1915		
Luna Park	Charleston, West Virginia	1912	1923		
Luna Park	Cleveland, Ohio	1905	1929		
Luna Park	Pittsburgh, Pennsylvania	1905	1909		
Luna Park	Scranton, Pennsylvania	1906	1916		
Manawa Park	Council Bluffs, Iowa		1928		
Merrimack Park	Methuen, Massachusetts	1921	1938		
Minerva Park	Minerva Park, Ohio	1895	1902		
Mountain Park	Holyoke, Massachusetts	1897	1987		
Mount Holly Park	Mount Holly Springs, Pennsylvania	1901	1930		
Neptune Beach	Alameda, California	1917	1939		
Norumbega Park	Newton, Massachusetts	1897	1963		
Oakland Park	Rockport, Maine	1902			
Ocean View Park	Norfolk, Virginia	1879	1979		
Olentangy Park	Columbus, Ohio	1896	1937		
Olympic Park	Irvington/Maplewood, New Jersey				
Ondawa Park	Greenwich, New York			Delaware and Hudson Railway	
Palisades Amusement Park	Cliffside Park and Fort Lee, New Jersey	1898	1971		
Paxtang Park	Harrisburg, Pennsylvania				
Pine Island Park	Manchester, New Hampshire				
Piney Ridge Park	Broad Brook, Connecticut				Located on a branch of the Hartford & Springfield Street Railway, now along the line of the Connecticut Trolley Museum
Playland	San Francisco, California	1927	1972		Also known as Playland at the Beach
Ponce de Leon amusement park	Atlanta, Georgia				
Puritas Springs Park	Cleveland, Ohio				
Riverhurst Park	Weston Mills, New York				
Riverside Amusement Park	Indianapolis, Indiana	190	1970		
Rock City Park	Allegany, New York				
Rock Springs Park	Chester, West Virginia				
Rocky Glen Park	Near Moosic, Pennsylvania				Later became Ghost Town at the Glen before becoming New Rocky Glen
Ramona Park	East Grand Rapids, Michigan				
Rorick’s Glen	Elmira, New York	1901	1917		
Savin Rock Amusement Park	West Haven, Connecticut	1870s	1966		
Scarboro Beach Amusement Park	Toronto, Ontario	1907	1925		
Shady Grove Park	Uniontown, Pennsylvania				
Shellpot Park	Near Wilmington, Delaware				
Suburban Gardens	Washington, D.C.				
Sutro Baths	San Francisco, California	1896	1966		
Terrapin Park	Parkersburg, West Virginia				
Vanity Fair	East Providence, Rhode Island				
West View Park	West View, Pennsylvania				
Whalom Park	Lunenburg, Massachusetts				
White City	Atlanta, Georgia	1910	1925		
White City	Indianapolis, Indiana	1906	1908		
White City	Philadelphia, Pennsylvania	1898	1912		
White City	Shrewsbury, Massachusetts				
Wildwood Amusement Park	Mahtomedi, Minnesota				
Willow Grove Park	Willow Grove, Pennsylvania	1896	1976		Now the Willow Grove Park Mall, but still has a carousel inside the shopping mall.
Woodside Amusement Park	Philadelphia, Pennsylvania	1897	1955		
Wonderland Amusement Park	Indianapolis, Indiana	1906	1911		
Wonderland Amusement Park	Revere, Massachusetts	1906	1910		
Wonderland Amusement Park	Minneapolis, Minnesota	1905	1911		

== See also ==
- Oregon Electric Railway Museum—a trolley museum that, at its original location, was called the "Trolley Park"
