= Fort George Amusement Park =

Amusement park in New York City (1894–1914)

Coordinates: 40°51′16″N 73°55′33″W

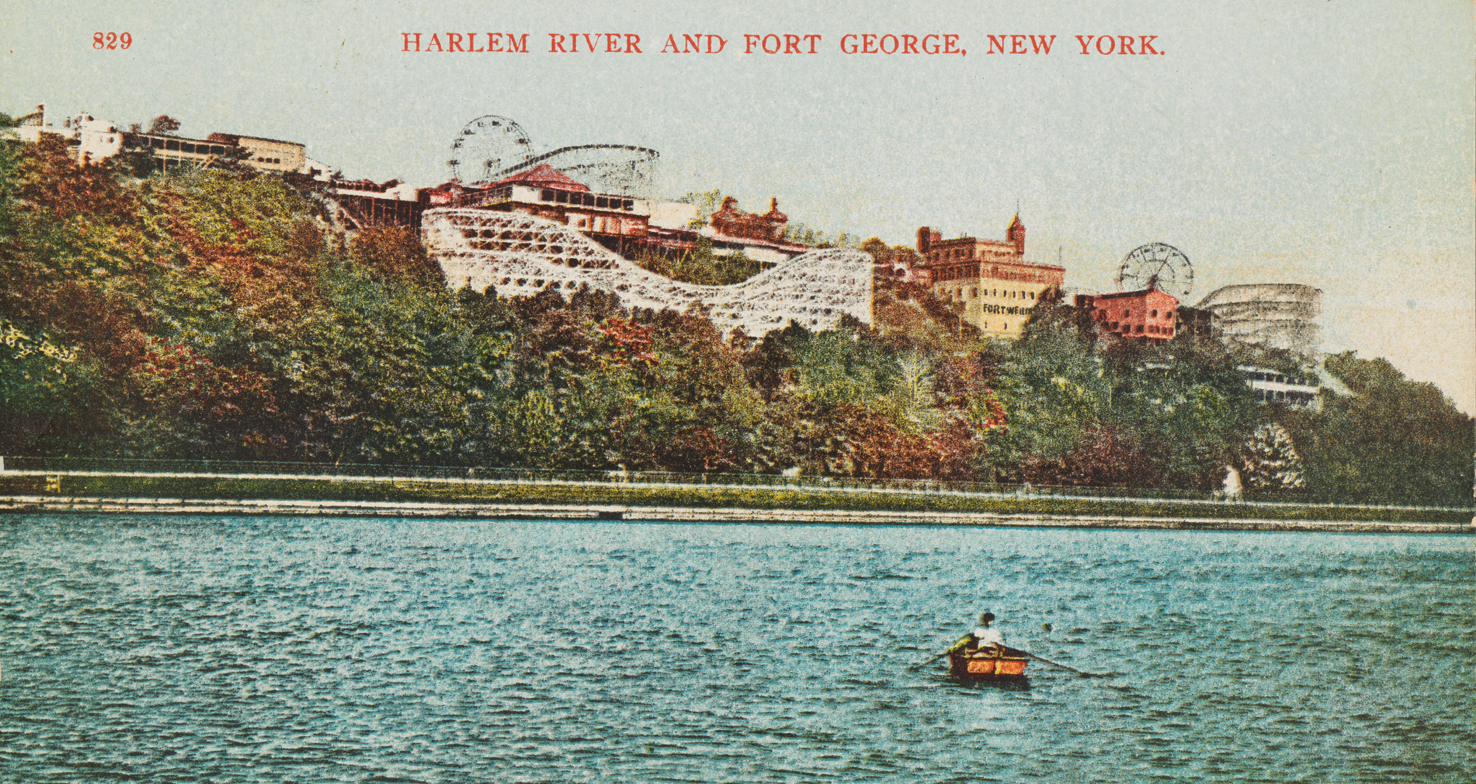
Postcard dated 1905

Fort George Amusement Park was a trolley park and amusement park that operated in the Washington Heights and Inwood neighborhoods of Upper Manhattan, New York City, in the late 19th and early 20th centuries. It occupied an area between 190th and 192nd Streets east of Amsterdam Avenue, within present-day Highbridge Park.

== History ==
The site was named after Fort George, where General George Washington fought the British during the American Revolutionary War. Fort George, located at the end of the Third Avenue trolley line (now the M101 bus), was developed as a trolley park around 1894. The area soon became known as "Harlem's Coney Island", after the neighborhood in southern Brooklyn that was well known for its amusements. The area was initially a disjointed mixture of amusements, operated by mostly German concessionaires who had previously operated at Jones's Wood, a former park on the Upper East Side that had predated Central Park. Other attractions included John F. Schultheis's hotel and casino, created in 1899 and later burned down, as well as the Harlem River Speedway, now a state parkway.

In 1905, Russian immigrants Joseph and Nicholas Schenck opened the Old Barrel, a beer hall in Fort George. The Schencks felt that Fort George needed additional amusement rides, and to that extent, they formed a partnership with theater operator Marcus Loew. The Schencks and Loew had added a vaudeville stage and multiple rides by 1906, under the collective name of Paradise Park. The park, located within the Fort George amusement area, was popular despite being inaccessible except via a set of 56 steps. The group set a 10-cent fare for admission to the park. The new rides included a 30-foot-tall (9.1 m) slide, a 16-bucket Ferris wheel, and additional lighting. Elmer "Skip" Dundy and Frederic Thompson, owners of Coney Island's Luna Park, planned to build a ride called "Vanity Fair" at Paradise Park, but these efforts failed after Dundy's death in 1907.

Despite initially providing economic benefits for Washington Heights residents, Paradise Park soon became disliked by residents due to its high crime and constant noise pollution. William McAdoo, the New York City Police Commissioner, unsuccessfully attempted to remedy these problems. McAdoo started enforcing foot patrols and closing the park at 8 p.m. each night after September 1908. Even so, complaints of harassment continued to rise, and the formerly genteel amusement park was no longer considered safe for the working class. Local residents, led by neighborhood activist Reginald Pelham Bolton, started asking for the closure of the park in 1910, citing these nuisances. That year, the Schencks sold Fort George Amusement Park and used the money to buy Palisades Amusement Park in Cliffside Park, New Jersey, across the Hudson River to the west. Furthermore, real estate developers began considering the area for future development.

Paradise Park was partially burned in an arson in 1911 but was rebuilt for the following season. By that point, the skating rink building was being used by the Queen Aeroplane Company to assemble airplanes. In 1913, the entire park was burned again in a large arson which could reportedly be seen from 42nd Street, several miles to the south. The only attraction to survive relatively unscathed was Carousel Number 15, built by the Philadelphia Toboggan Company. Despite Joseph Schenck's promises to rebuild Paradise Park, there was great opposition to a reconstruction of the park. When Paradise Park's leases expired in 1914, many of the amusements were destroyed, though some concessionaires continued to hold their land for several more years. The New York City Department of Parks and Recreation acquired the land as part of Highbridge Park in 1928. The remainder of Fort George Playground became the site of the George Washington High School. No evidence remains of the amusement park at that site, but Carousel No. 15 was later brought to Palisades Center shopping mall in West Nyack, New York.

== Attractions ==
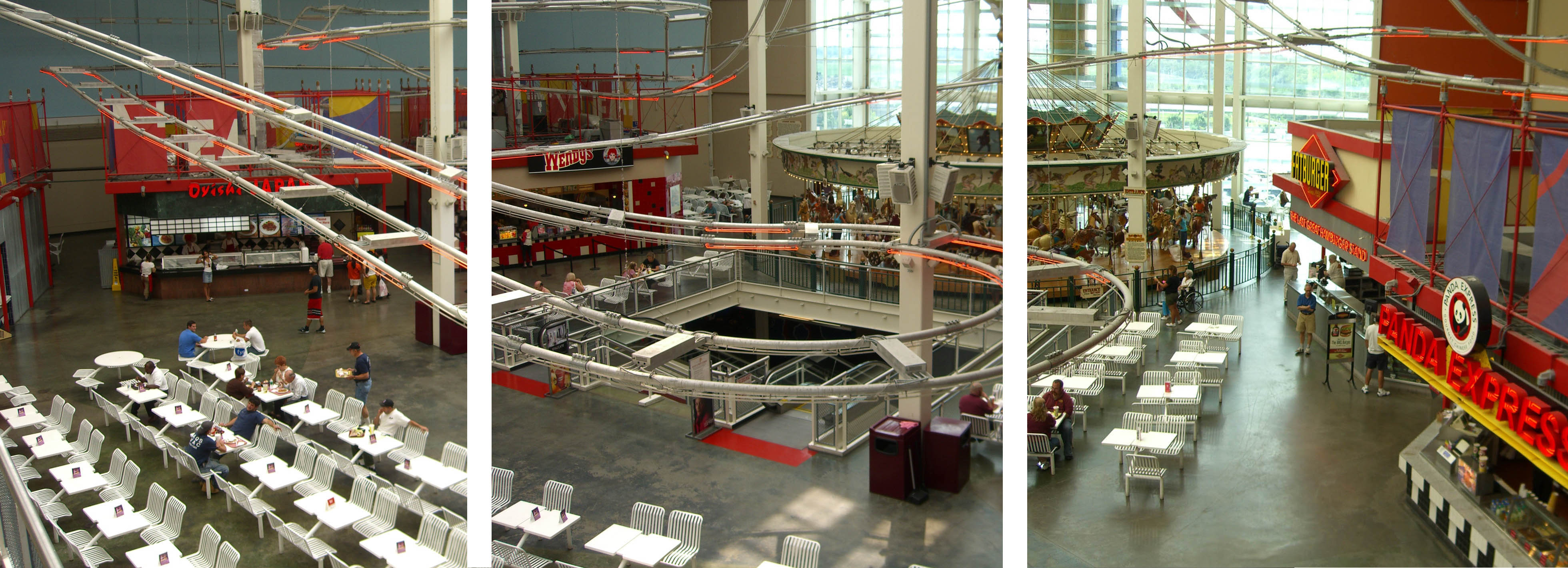
Carousel No. 15, seen at its later home at the Palisades Center

At its peak, Fort George Amusement Park included three carousels, two Ferris wheels, a boat ride, a toboggan ride, and three roller coasters. Two of the roller coasters, the Rough Rider and the Tickler, were designed by Coney Island amusement designer William F. Mangels. These attractions made the area comparable to other trolley parks such as Coney Island's Luna Park and Steeplechase Park.

The park also had entertainment venues such as a casino "for socializing, not gambling”", hotels, and a pony-racing track. Amenities included four music halls: from north to south, they were the Trocadero, the Star, the Paradise Park Music Hall, and the Curve. There were also five saloons and nine shooting galleries, as well as various Coney Island-style sideshows. Paradise Park also contained areas where children could play in a setting much like a modern playground. In addition, the park included the Fort George Scenic Railroad and a seasonal ice-skating rink. Various restaurant concessions were operated at the park, such as a popcorn-and-candy concession operated by Mary Gish (the mother of actors Dorothy and Lillian Gish), as well as the Fort Wendel Hotel and Cafe.
