= Forest Park (Ballston Lake, New York) =

Park in Ballston Lake, New York, United States

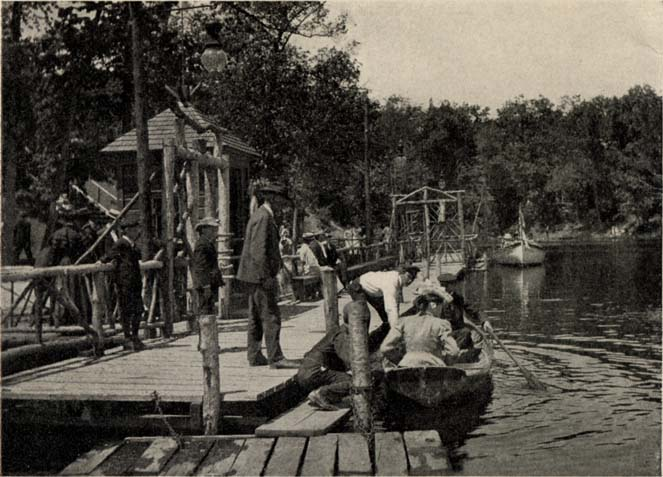
Forest Park landing on Ballston Lake ca.1910

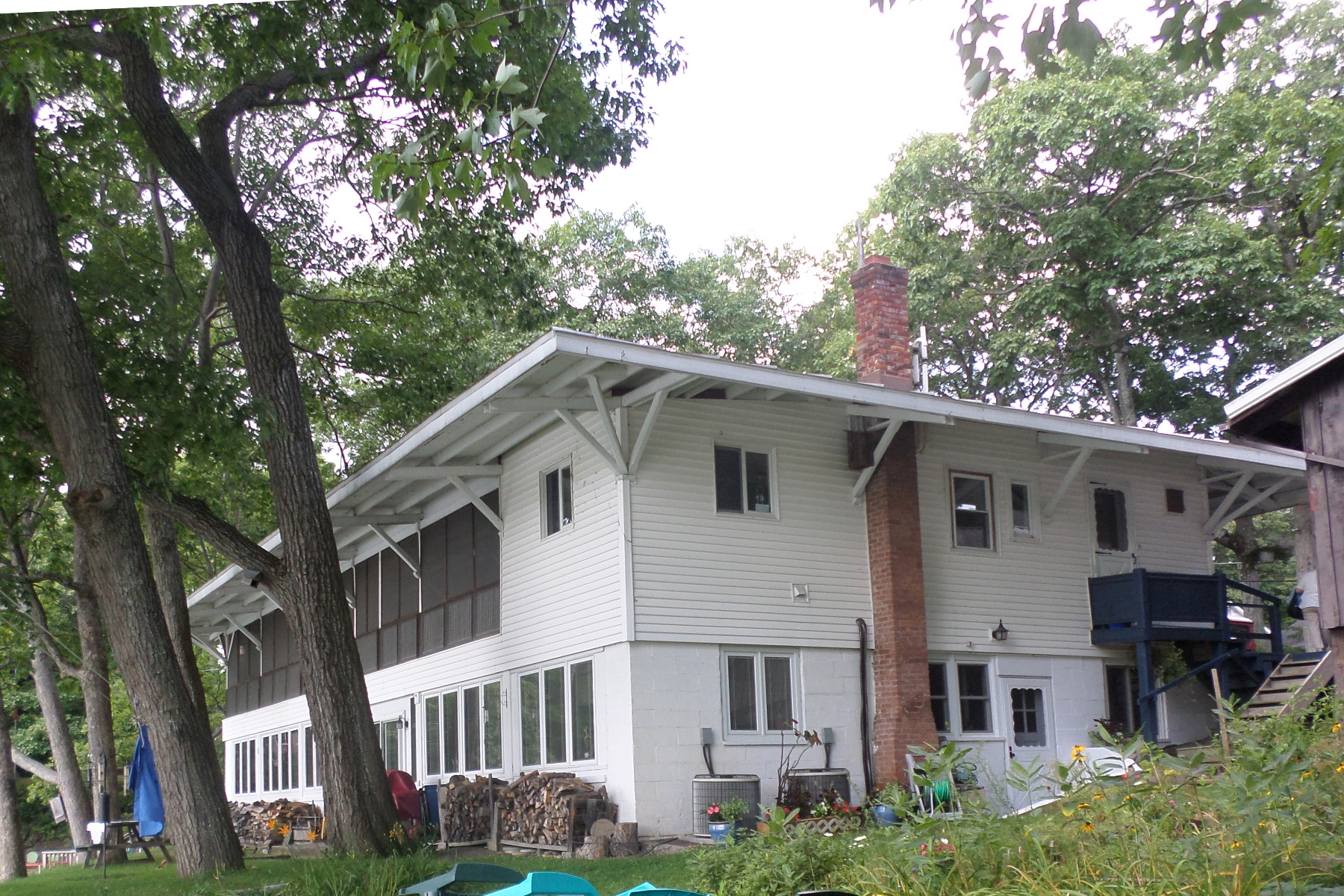
Forest Park dining hall in 2016, now a private home

Forest Park was a trolley park in the town of Ballston, New York, United States. The park was built by the Schenectady Railway Company, owned by General Electric. It consisted of 144 acres (58 ha) located at the south end of Ballston Lake along the company's Schenectady to Saratoga Springs trolley line, and was serviced by a dedicated stop. It opened in 1904 and closed in 1927. By 1908 the park was said to have attracted between 75,000 and 100,000 visitors every season.

The chief attraction of the park was its lake access. A small steam launch, the Comanche, offered 30-minute lake excursions. A number of rowboats and canoes were available for rent, and there were facilities for swimming. On shore, the park offered a dance pavilion 40 by 80 feet (12 by 24 m) The park had a carousel, which is now located in Congress Park in Saratoga Springs, by way of Kaydeross Park. There was also a toboggan slide and a baseball diamond.

The park provided entertainment including a dance band for the pavilion, and hosted clambakes and picnics, often with fireworks after dark. A special trolley run, The Moonlight Special, brought people for dancing.

In addition to entertainment, the park provided an area of lakefront, 100 by 150 feet (30 by 46 m) as of 1908, which was subdivided into small lots and leased to individuals who could then construct a cottage on it. The lessee paid an annual rent for the property but remained the owner of any building. By 1927 when the park closed there were 113 lessees.

When the park closed it was listed as containing "an inn containing 10 or 12 rooms, a dance pavilion, a dining hall, ice cream parlor, log cabin, shooting gallery, restaurant and restaurant storehouse, boat house, ice house, pump house, dock, and on the east shore of the lake “the castle”."
