= Shady Grove Park =

Former amusement park in Lemont Furnace, Pennsylvania

Coordinates: 39°55′52″N 79°39′10″W

Shady Grove Park was a trolley park in Lemont Furnace, Pennsylvania. It operated as an amusement park and campground from 1905 to 2012.

== Park history ==
Opened in 1905 to help boost ridership on the West Penn Railways streetcar line, the park was originally a picnic grove and landscaped wooded leisure area, like many other trolley parks of the time period. Built on the edge of a small artificial lake, boating and swimming were one of the first amusements offered at the park. The park began to acquire rides and build amusements in the years following its founding. A large concrete swimming pool replaced the artificial lake as the park's main water feature in the 1930s. This pool continued to operate until the park's closure in 2012.

Shady Grove Park housed several rides and attractions, including a roller coaster, a Ferris wheel, a funhouse called "House of Mirth", a theater, a shooting gallery, a photo gallery, a restaurant, and two large dance halls. The roller coaster, Wildcat, opened in 1925, and was a large wooden coaster that spanned the entire length of the property. It was designed by Traver Engineering of Beaver Falls, Pennsylvania. The dance halls attracted many large names of the jazz age.

In later years, additions were made in the form of a roller skating rink, aeroplane swing, merry-go-round, a junior ride-on railway, and child sized versions of many of the adult rides. A fire in 1937 damaged and destroyed several of the park's structures and rides, including the Wildcat roller coaster, but the park recovered, and continued operating well into the 1960s. In the early 1970s, the decision was made to remove the park's remaining rides due to increasing maintenance costs. A fountain in the pool also underwent maintenance after someone drowned under its concrete arches. The park continued to operate as a picnic destination, campground, and public pool until its closing in 2012.

All that remains of Shady Grove Park in present day is a few boarded-up structures and an empty concrete pool foundation. One of the cars from Wildcat survives at Kennywood Park in their storage, as it was on display for several years at the entrance to the Lost Kennywood section of the park, along with several photos of Shady Grove park. Several concrete footings from former rides can be found buried in the former Shady Grove Park property.
