= Contoocook River Amusement Park =

Trolley park in New Hampshire, US

Coordinates: 43.270159°N 71.611075°W

Contoocook River Amusement Park was a trolley park in Penacook, New Hampshire. The park was developed along the south bank of the Contoocook River. For twenty cents in 1893, and up until 1925, one could ride 7 miles (11 km) on the trolley from downtown Concord to Penacook to enjoy free entertainment, fireworks, swimming, dancing at a large pavilion, boating, roller-skating, bowling, and even a steamboat ride up the Contoocook River. The park closed in 1925.

Electric Avenue, a dirt road that is part of the Concord Trail System, now leads through a wooded area where trolley car tracks once ran. Little trace of the park remains.
