= Maple Springs, New York =

- Hamlet
- Map of New York
- Coordinates: 42°11′48″N 79°25′26″W
- Country: United States
- State: New York
- County: Chautauqua
- Town: Ellery
- Elevation: 1,312 ft (400 m)

Population (2010)
  - Total: 110
- Time zone: UTC−05:00 (EST)
  - Summer (DST): UTC-04:00 (EDT)
- ZIP code: 14756
- Area code: 716

Maple Springs is a hamlet located within the Town of Ellery in Chautauqua County, New York, United States at an elevation of 1,312 feet (400 m) above sea level. It is situated along the east shore of Chautauqua Lake, between the villages of Mayville and Bemus Point. New York State Route 430 passes through the hamlet. The postal code is 14756, and its permanent population as of the 2010 United States census was 110, with an average age of 49.3 years of age living in 136 housing units.

Maple Springs, home of the historic Whiteside Hotel opened by William Whiteside in 1879 (boasting access by both steamboat and rail service), was recently recognized by the Bemus Point Historical Society for its historical significance. Initial room rates in 1879 started at $8.00 a week, and the hotel remained open for 105 years.

Maple Springs is the setting for Midway State Park, the fifth-oldest remaining trolley park and fifteenth-oldest amusement park in the nation. It was listed on the National Register of Historic Places in 2009.
