= 5 Wits =

American entertainment venue chain

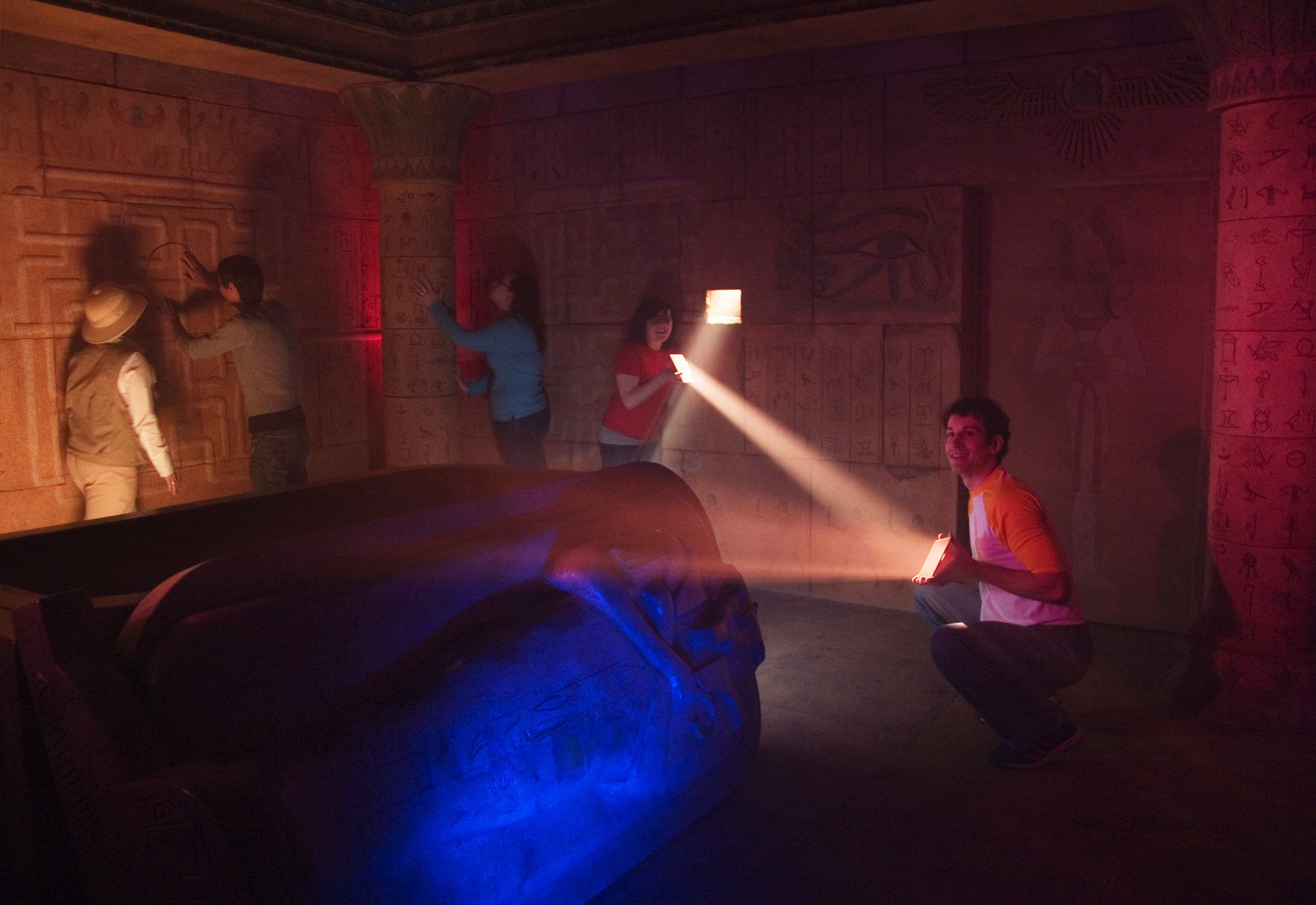
- Players solve a puzzle in the original 5 Wits adventure, Tomb, in downtown Boston, circa 2006.
- Established: 2004
- Collection size: Interactive immersive adventures
- Website: 5-wits.com

5 Wits is a chain entertainment venue that builds interactive adventure experiences with five locations in the United States. The experiences have similarities with escape rooms, but are essentially meant for replayability, without puzzle solving under a fixed amount of time or difficulty restrictions. 5 Wits has been called the first "escape room type" attraction in the world, having first opened to the public in October 2004.

== Description ==
Each location features interactive adventures with themes such as 20,000 Leagues Under the Sea, a high tech spy mission, outer space, ancient Egypt, and medieval fantasy. In each adventure, a group of 2-12 guests are faced with puzzles and challenges they must overcome as a team as they work to progress through a series of rooms and complete their mission. There are computer controlled lighting and sound effects, optical illusions, and a wide variety of physical and mental puzzles and electromechanical effects. Guests can succeed or fail, and each adventure has multiple endings that will change based on how the group performs and what decisions the group makes.

5 Wits adventures are controlled completely by computer and do not involve a human operator, with each attraction self-resetting behind each group as it progresses.

=== Adventures ===
- Deep Space (Syracuse, West Nyack, Albany, Buffalo) - A futuristic adventure where adventure goers get teleported to an abandoned starship and they must work together to figure out what happened to the crew, but not everything is what it seems.
- Drago's Castle (Syracuse, West Nyack, Albany, Buffalo, Arlington) - A medieval fantasy where adventure goers help a magical princess catch a fire-breathing dragon before it can destroy her world and theirs.
- Espionage (Syracuse, Arlington) - A spy adventure where adventure goers become secret agents and must infiltrate an enemy base to stop a false flag event.
- Tomb (Syracuse, West Nyack, Albany, Buffalo, Arlington) - An Indiana Jones style adventure where adventure goers must answer the riddles of a long dead pharaoh or else be trapped forever.

== Origin of the name ==
5 Wits is named after the five inward wits from the writings of William Shakespeare and Stephen Hawes. These five wits were common sense, imagination, estimation, fantasy, and memory, though there are also clear associations to the five senses. Each 5 Wits adventure requires the use of the five inward wits and is designed to immerse guests fully in a "5 senses themed" experience.

== History ==
5 Wits was incorporated in 2003 by founder and president Matthew DuPlessie. The original business plan for 5 Wits, first called the Puzzle Room, was written and entered into the business plan competition at Harvard Business School in early 2003. 5 Wits' first location opened in October 2004 at 186 Brookline Avenue in Boston hosting TOMB, 5 Wits' first adventure.

In 2006, 5 Wits spun off a sister company, Box Fort (originally called 5 Wits Productions), to design and build walk-through adventures for its growing business and provide services for third-party clients like museums, theaters, and theme parks. In 2007, 5 Wits opened Operation Spy, an hour long walk-through adventure inside the International Spy Museum.

In 2010, 5 Wits moved the original TOMB adventure to Pigeon Forge, Tennessee, selling it to a third party. The original TOMB continues to operate but is no longer owned or operated by 5 Wits. Meanwhile, a new 5 Wits location opened in August of that same year in Foxborough, Massachusetts, at Patriot Place (adjacent to Gillette Stadium) hosting Espionage and 20,000 Leagues. Since then, multiple new locations have opened, primarily in the state of New York.

== Locations ==
The company's five venues are located in:

- Syracuse, New York, at Destiny USA
- West Nyack, New York, at Palisades Center. This location opened in 2016 in a space that was an IMAX theater in the mall.
- Albany, New York, at Crossgates Mall. This location is nearly identical to the West Nyack location.
- Buffalo, New York, at Walden Galleria
- Arlington, Virginia, at Ballston Quarter, which opened in February 2019
