= Midway State Park =

State park in Chautauqua County, New York

- Interactive map of Midway State Park
- Location: Maple Springs, New York, United States
- Opened: 1898
- Owner: New York State Office of Parks, Recreation and Historic Preservation
- Slogan: Continuing the Tradition
- Operating season: May – September

Attractions
- Total: 20
- Website: Midway State Park
- Midway Park
- U.S. National Register of Historic Places
- U.S. Historic district
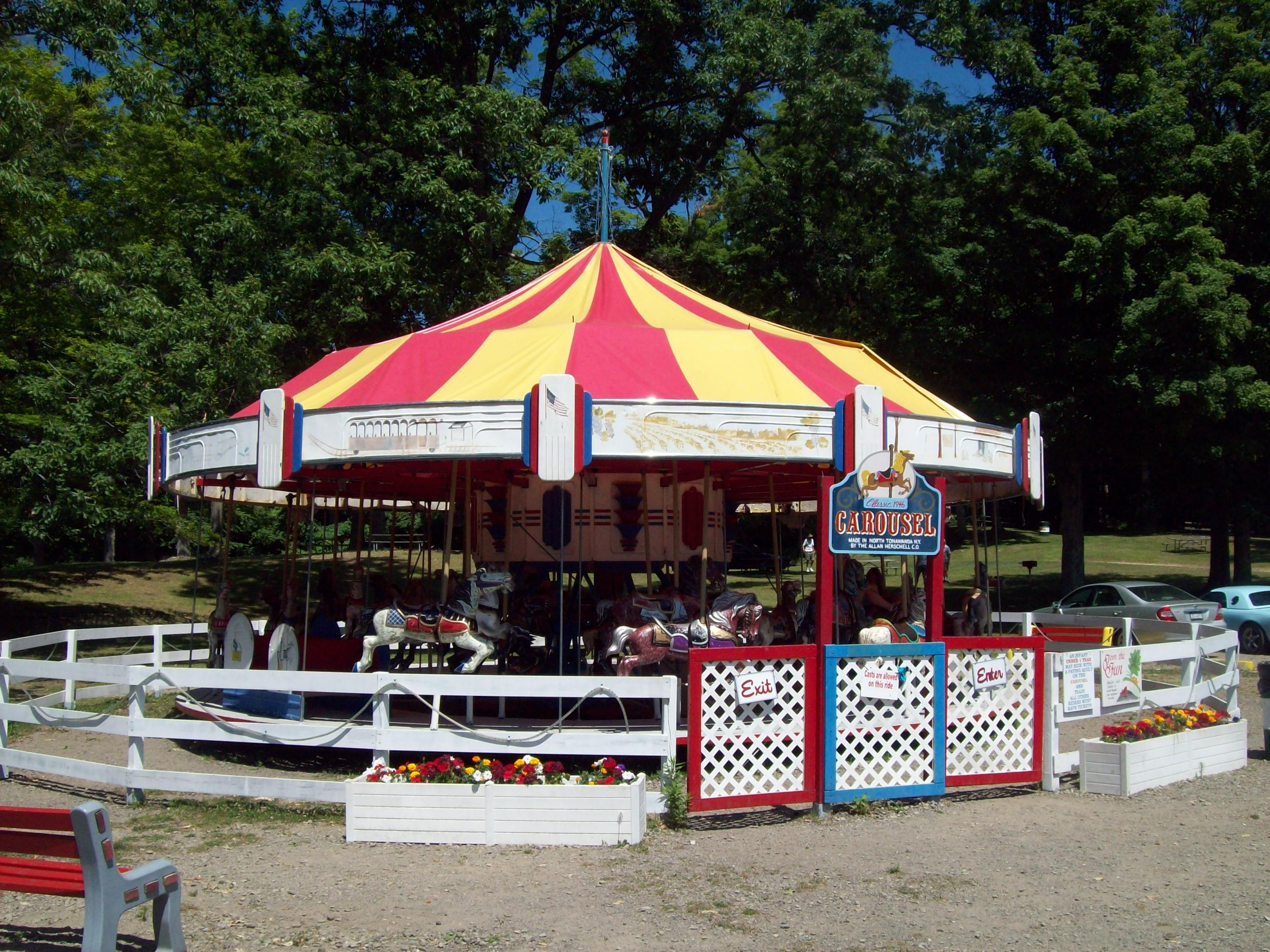
- Carousel (1946), July 2012

- Location within New York Location within the United States
- Location: NY 430, Maple Springs, New York
- Coordinates: 42°12′14″N 79°25′14″W
- Area: 44 acres (17.8 ha)
- Built: 1898
- Built by: Allan Herschell Carousel Company; W.F. Mangels Company
- NRHP reference No.: 09000133
- Added to NRHP: March 13, 2009

Midway State Park, located in Maple Springs, New York, was established in 1898 by the Jamestown & Lake Erie Railway as a picnic ground. Today, it is recognized as the fifteenth-oldest continually operating amusement park in the United States, and the fifth-oldest remaining trolley park of the thirteen still operating in the United States.

== History ==
At its origin, Midway Park offered a baseball field, dance pavilion and dining hall, and a sandy beach for bathing. Today, the park uses the original picnic shelters with several more modern additions. The concession building was built in 1915 and still houses the refreshment stands, as well as the Carousel Museum and roller rink.

In 1951, the park was purchased by Martin "Red" Walsh, and was later operated by the next generation of the Walsh family, Michael and Janis Walsh, affectionately known as Mr. and Mrs. Midway to the staff and "park regulars." After the 2006 season the park was transferred into the New York State Parks system.

Several notable people have visited the park since its opening, including Franklin D. Roosevelt Jr., Lucille Ball, and Jack Paar, former host of NBC's The Tonight Show. In 1960, the Glenn Miller Orchestra conducted by Ray McKinley played at the park.

Midway State Park has been voted the Best Travel Destination in Chautauqua County by the readers of the Dunkirk Observer.

It was added to the National Register of Historic Places in 2009, as a national historic district. Its 44 acres (18 ha) encompasses 12 contributing buildings, one contributing site, and one contributing object. They include the Lakeside Pavilion (1915), arcade (1930), carousel (1948) and shelter (1924), park office (c. 1950), ice house (c. 1900), owner's residence (late 19th-century), Pavilion 1 (c. 1900), Pavilions 4 and 5 (c. 1920s), and a number of kiddie rides, many of which were built by the Allan Herschell Company.

=== Timeline ===
- 1894 - The name "Midway" originated when a new steamboat dock was built between existing docks at Point Whiteside and Maple Springs. The other docks at both points were abandoned, and the new dock became known as Midway.
- 1898 - Midway Park is the name chosen for the picnic grounds of the Jamestown & Lake Erie Railway. They leased 17 acres (69,000 m^{2}) - twelve wooded and five cleared - above Whiteside and nearly opposite Chautauqua Lake from Chautauqua Institution. The park has 500 feet (150 m) of lake front and a sandy beach for bathing. A dance pavilion and dining room were soon built.
- July 12, 1898 - Formal opening of Midway Park. Music and dancing, baseball, tennis, croquet, bathing, and boating are offered to patrons.
- August 1898 - Round-trip tickets on the railway from Jamestown or Mayville to Midway Park cost 25 cents; from Dewittville or Bemus Point, 20 cents.
- January 3, 1899 - Jamestown & Chautauqua Railway Company is now incorporated. It was reorganized from the Jamestown & Lake Erie Railway.
- July 1904 - Neither the Whiteside Hotel nor Maple Springs House have been open for three years. Midway, with the exception of Midway Park, has been taken off the Chautauqua County map. The dock and rail station are now called Maple Springs.
- March 18, 1907 - The rail company secures control of the steamboats and leases Long Point for picnic grounds. Now the corporations decide one site is ample for picnics, so the lease with Long Point is not renewed. A new pier is planned at Midway Park.
- April 1907 - Herb Norton receives the contract to build the 450-foot-long (140 m) pier at Midway Park. The $5,000 project was completed for the summer picnic season of 1907.
- November 8, 1913 - The Jamestown and Chautauqua Railway Company is purchased by A.N. and S.B. Broadhead, scions of a prominent Jamestown business family. The sale includes the Chautauqua Steamboat Company, and the firm's new name is the Jamestown, Westfield and Northwestern Railroad Company, which became known simply as the "JW".
- 1914 - The tracks are electrified as far as Mayville and the "JW" started carrying passengers to Midway Park.
- April 10, 1915 - Midway Park is purchased by the Chautauqua Lake Navigation Company from Dan G. Wood, who owned the property and had leased it in the past.
- July 31, 1915 - A huge new pavilion is erected at the park. On the second floor are roller-skating and dancing. The ground floor serves as a bath house and also boasts amenities such as cane racks, concessions, and a spacious restaurant.
- 1924 - A large wooden roller coaster called the Jack Rabbit is built at the park, but has a lifespan of fewer than 20 years before being demolished.
- May 1934 - Thomas Carr of Rochester, New York leases the park from the railroad company. Mr. Carr was the former manager of Celoron Park, another popular Chautauqua Lake amusement park.
- March 1935 - The steamboat pier at the park is destroyed when huge ice blocks are blown ashore.
- April 17, 1939 - Mr. Carr, who takes up residence in Maple Springs, buys the park outright from the rail company.
- March 1, 1951 - Martin "Red" Walsh purchases the park from the estate of Thomas Carr.
- 1953 - Martin Walsh incorporates Midway Park when his brother Frank joins him in the business. The Walsh brothers begin to expand and develop the facility, adding new rides and attractions.
- October 1984 - Michael Walsh, Martin's son, and his wife Janis, purchase the park from Martin Walsh.
- July 12, 1998 - Midway Park celebrates its centennial with "The Birthday Party Of The Century". Free birthday cake is distributed, and a Big Band Ballroom Dance is held to mark the occasion.
- 2005 - An agreement is reached between the owners (Michael & Janis Walsh) and New York State for purchase of the park. Actual ownership transfers after the 2006 operation season.
- May 25, 2007 - A Grand Opening Ceremony is held.
- March 13, 2009 - The park is designated a Historic District on the National Register of Historic Places.
- 2010 - Articles of incorporation signed to create "Friends of Midway State Park" - a non-profit organization to support the long term mission of Midway State Park.
- July 1, 2016 - Opening of new mini-golf course: Putt-A-Round Chautauqua at Midway State Park.

== Facilities ==
Currently, Midway Park has 18 child-oriented rides, plus miniature golf, Go-Karts, a climbing wall, and water games. Many of the kiddie rides were manufactured by the Allan Herschell Company of North Tonawanda, New York.

Guests use the picnic shelters for their family reunions and company picnics. The family arcade, meanwhile, includes games such as skeeball, Pac-Man and Galaga.

Midway operates from Memorial Day weekend through Labor Day, with a limited June schedule.

=== Current rides ===
- Carousel
- Climbing Wall
- Dodge 'Ems
- Fun Slide
- Go-Karts
- Handcars
- Helicopters
- Kiddie Boats
- Little Dipper Coaster
- Little Puffer Train (miniature railway)
- Mini-Golf
- Roadway
- Roto-Whip
- Skyfighter Jets
- Tilt-a-Whirl
- Tubs of Fun
- Tugboat Paddlers
- Water Wars
- Ferris Wheel

== Gallery ==
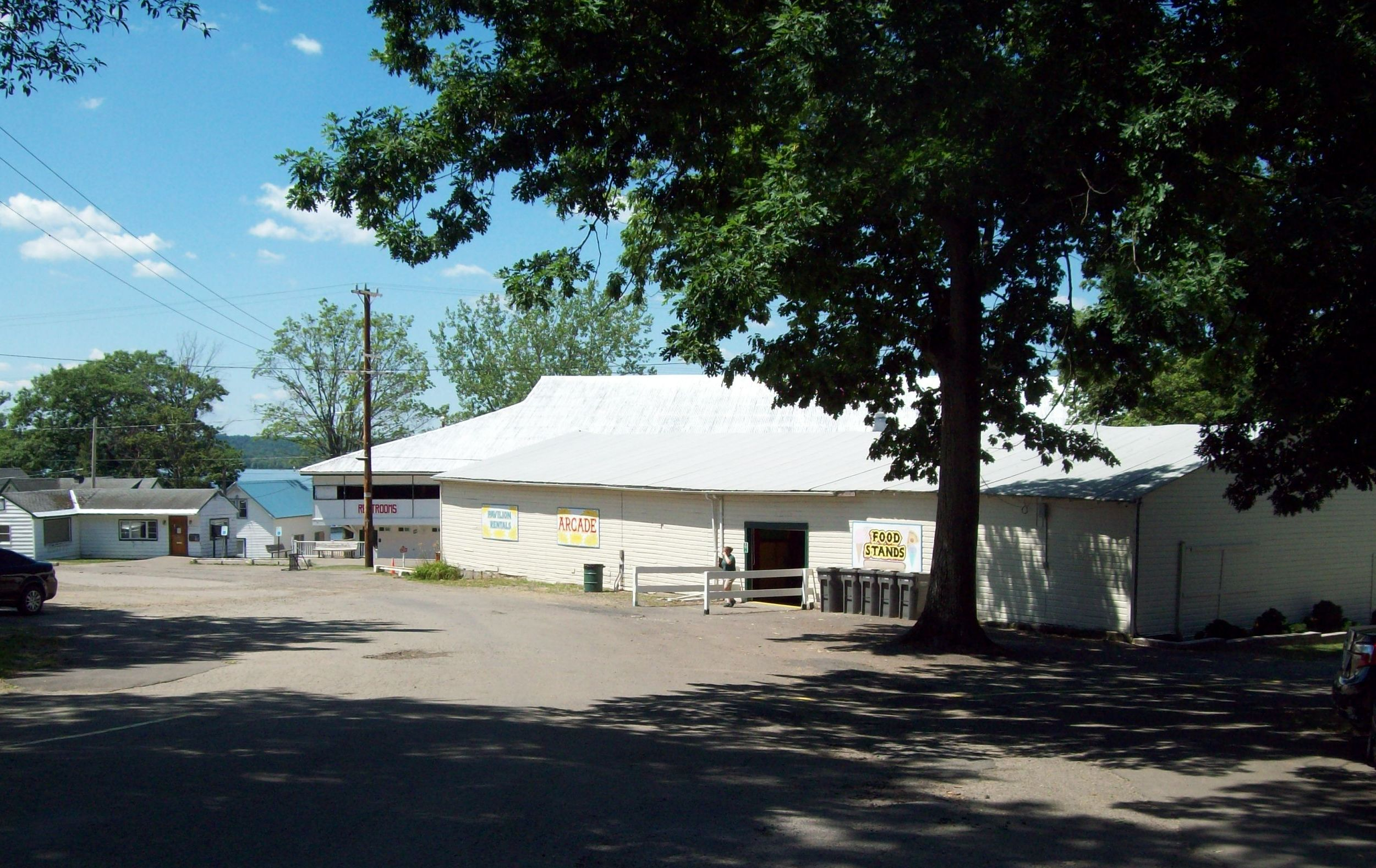
Arcade (1930), July 2012

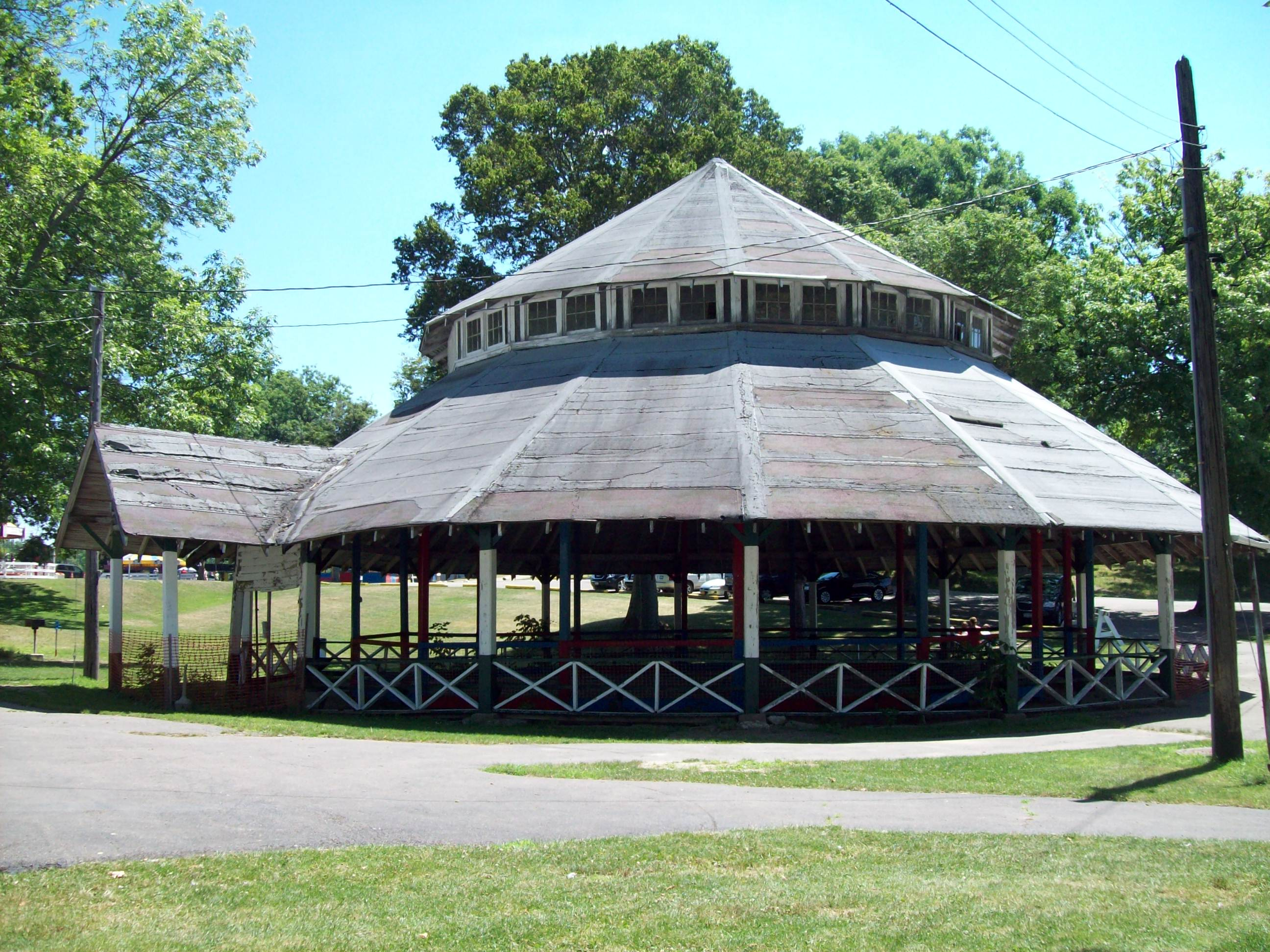
Carousel Shelter (1924), July 2012

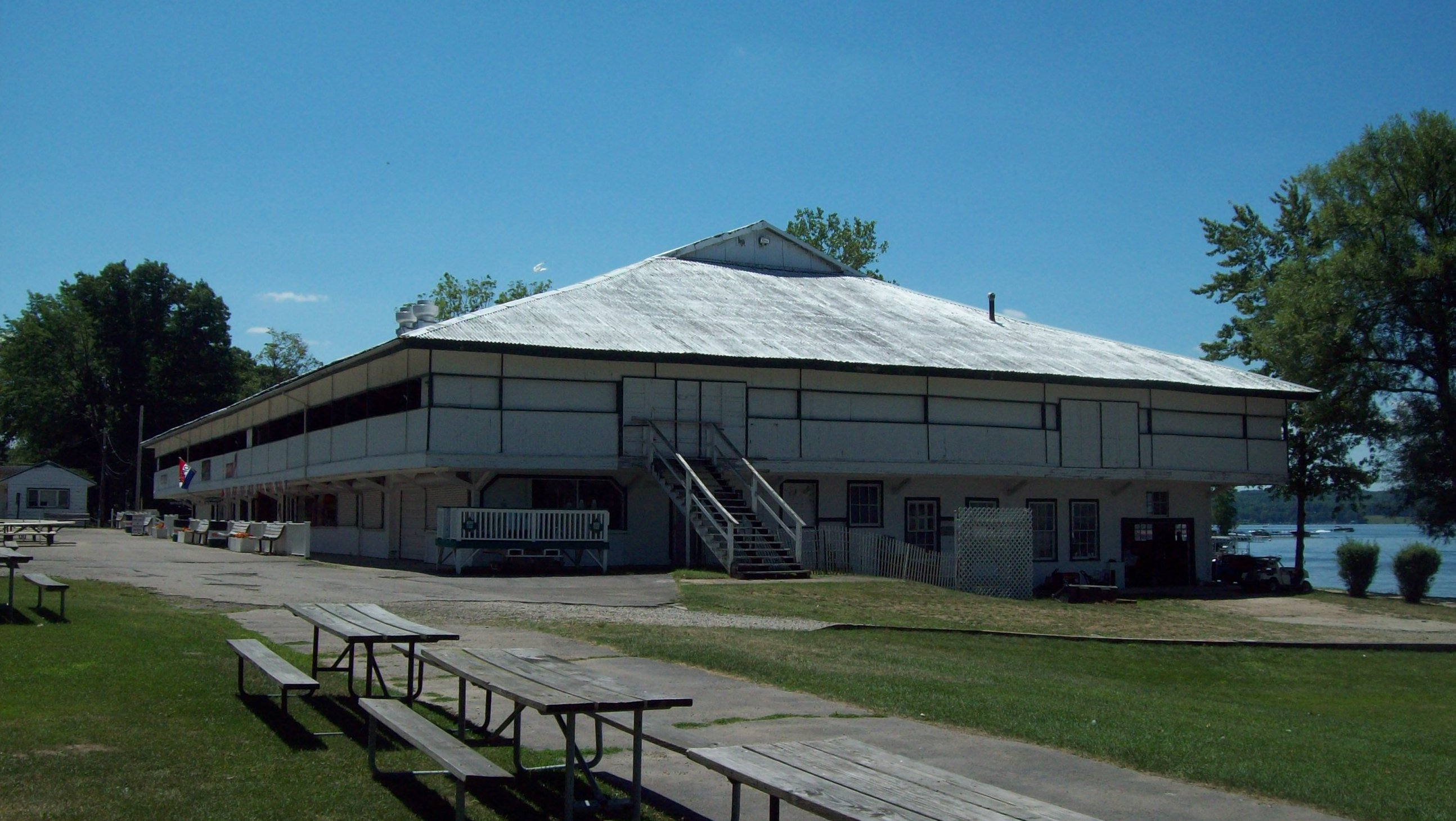
Lakeside Pavilion (1915), July 2012

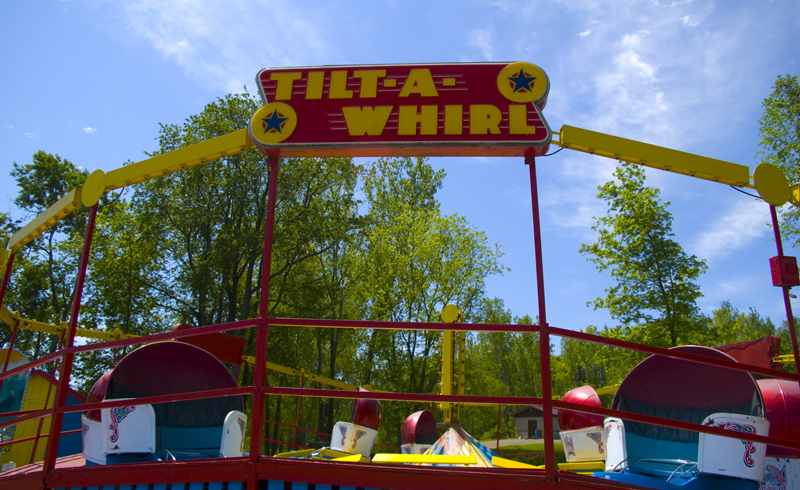
Tilt-A-Whirl at Midway Park

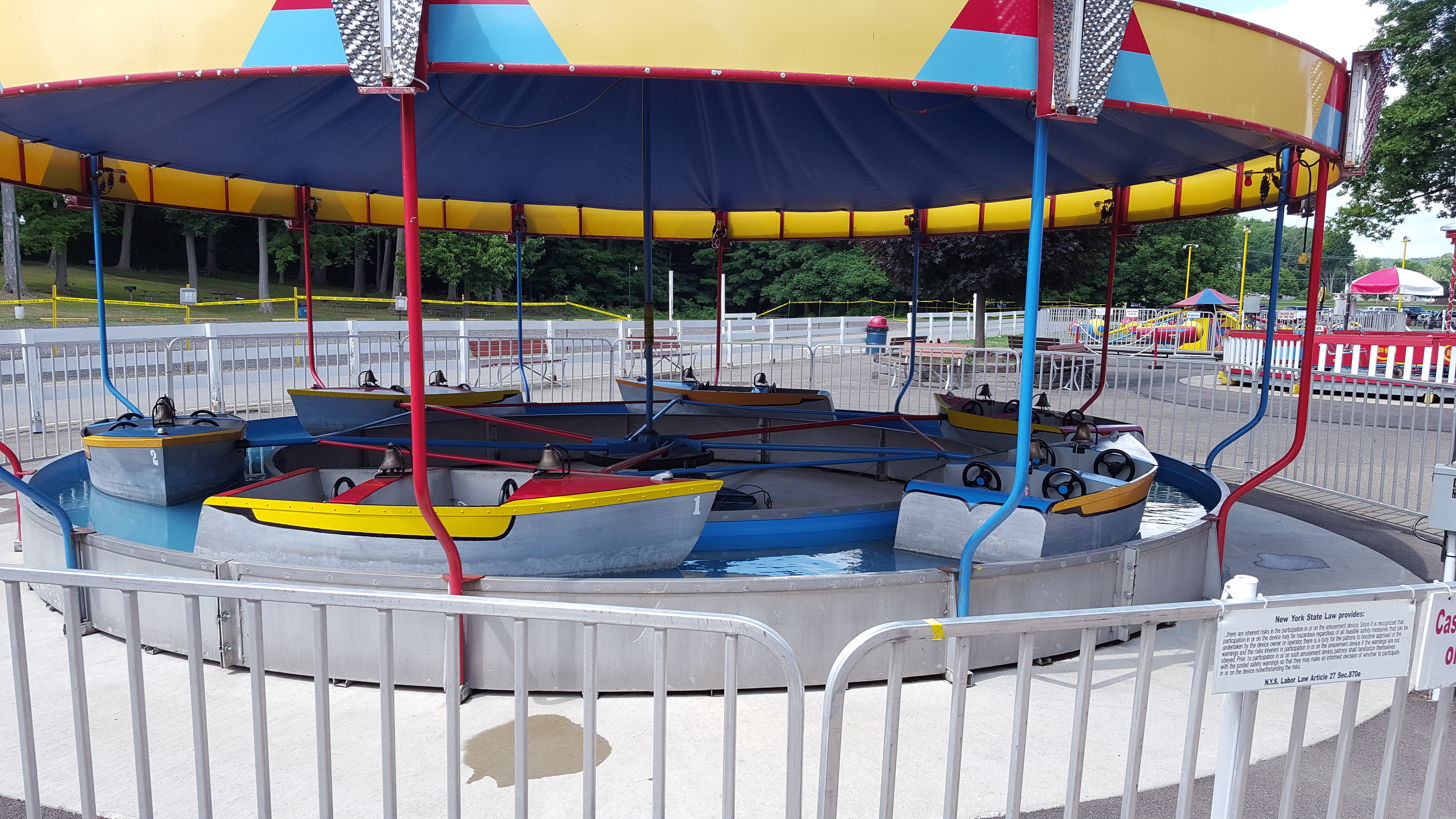
Midway Kiddie Boats 2016

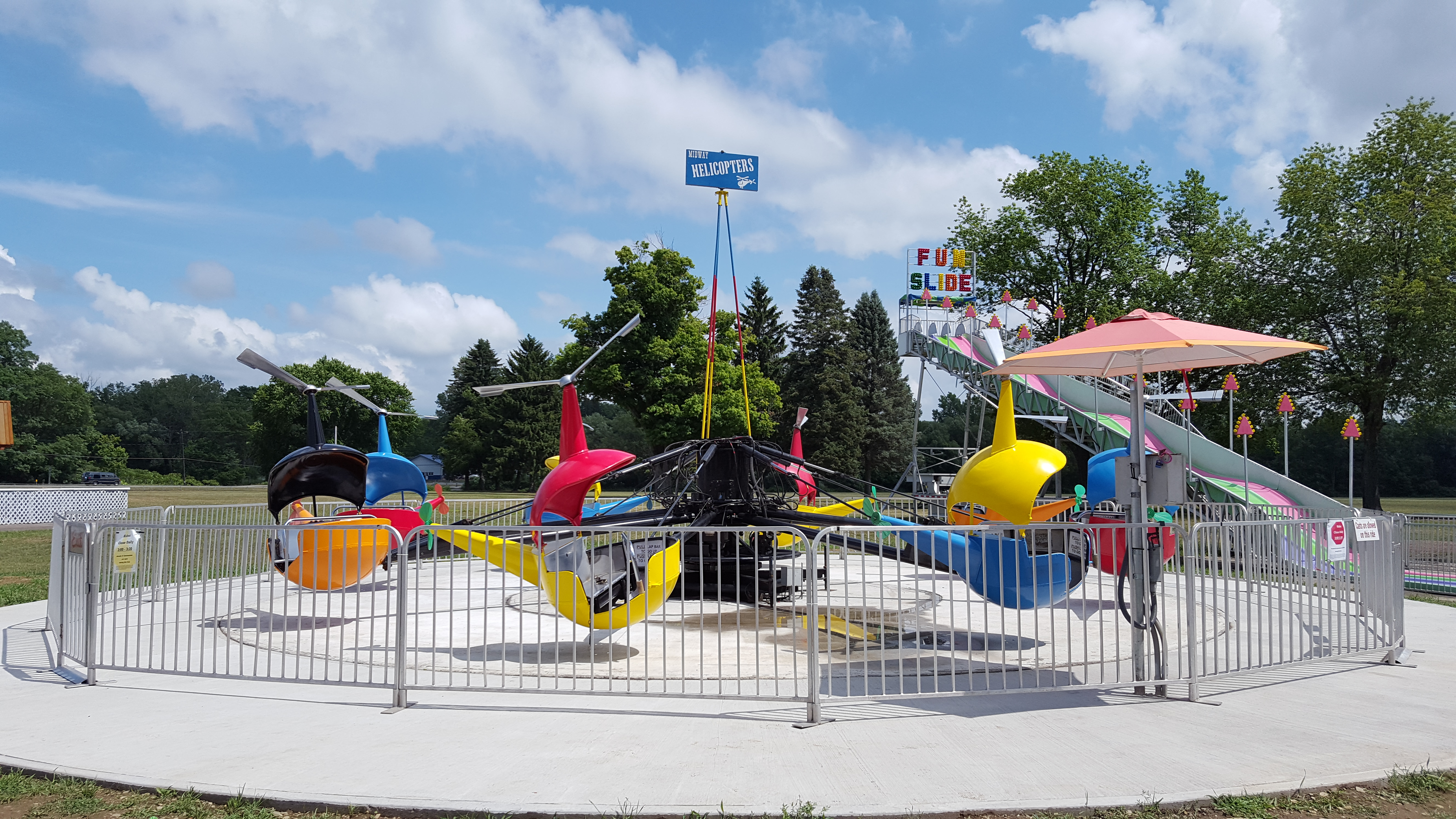
Midway Helicopters refurbished in their new location 2016

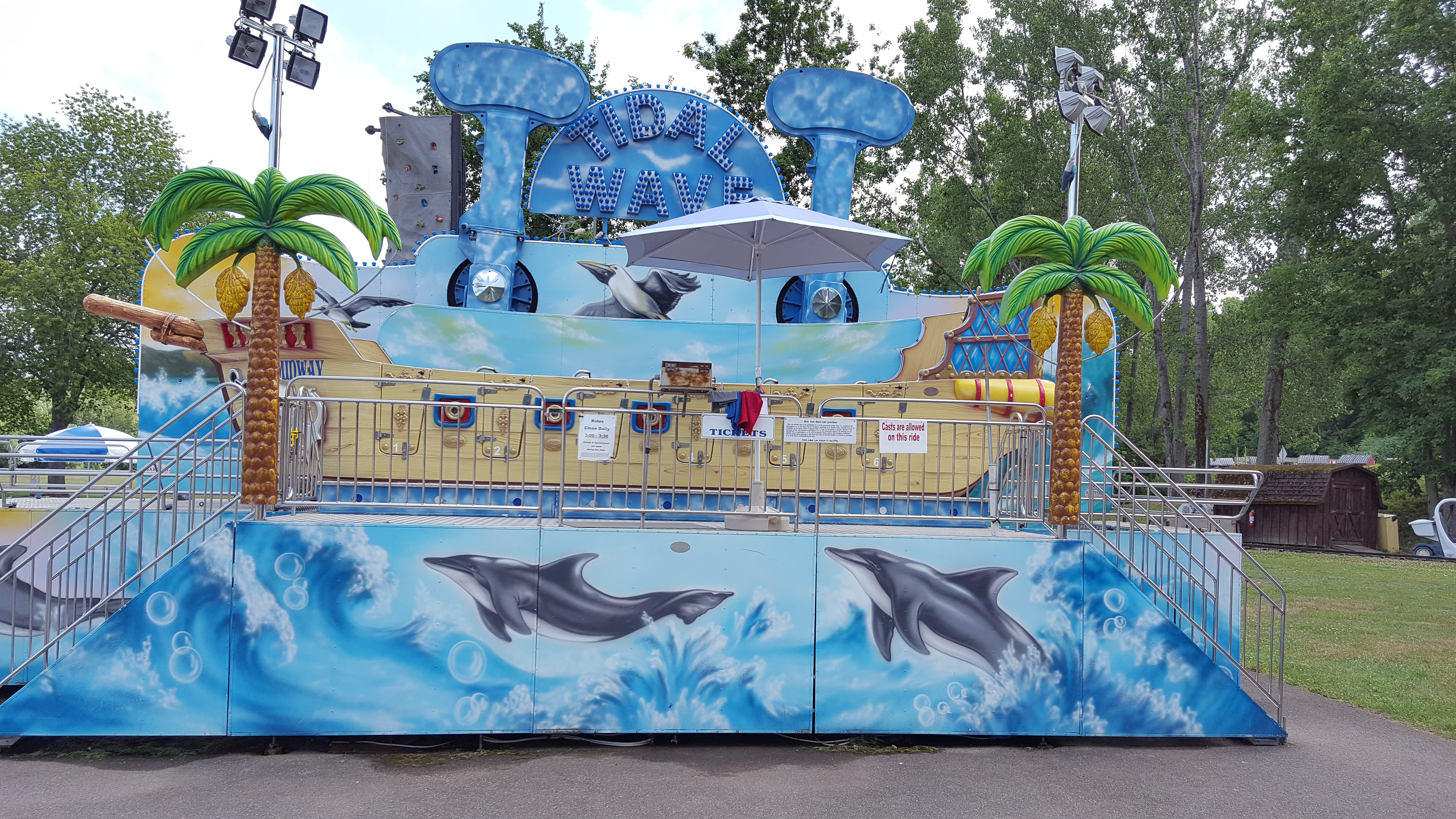
Midway Tidal Wave 2016

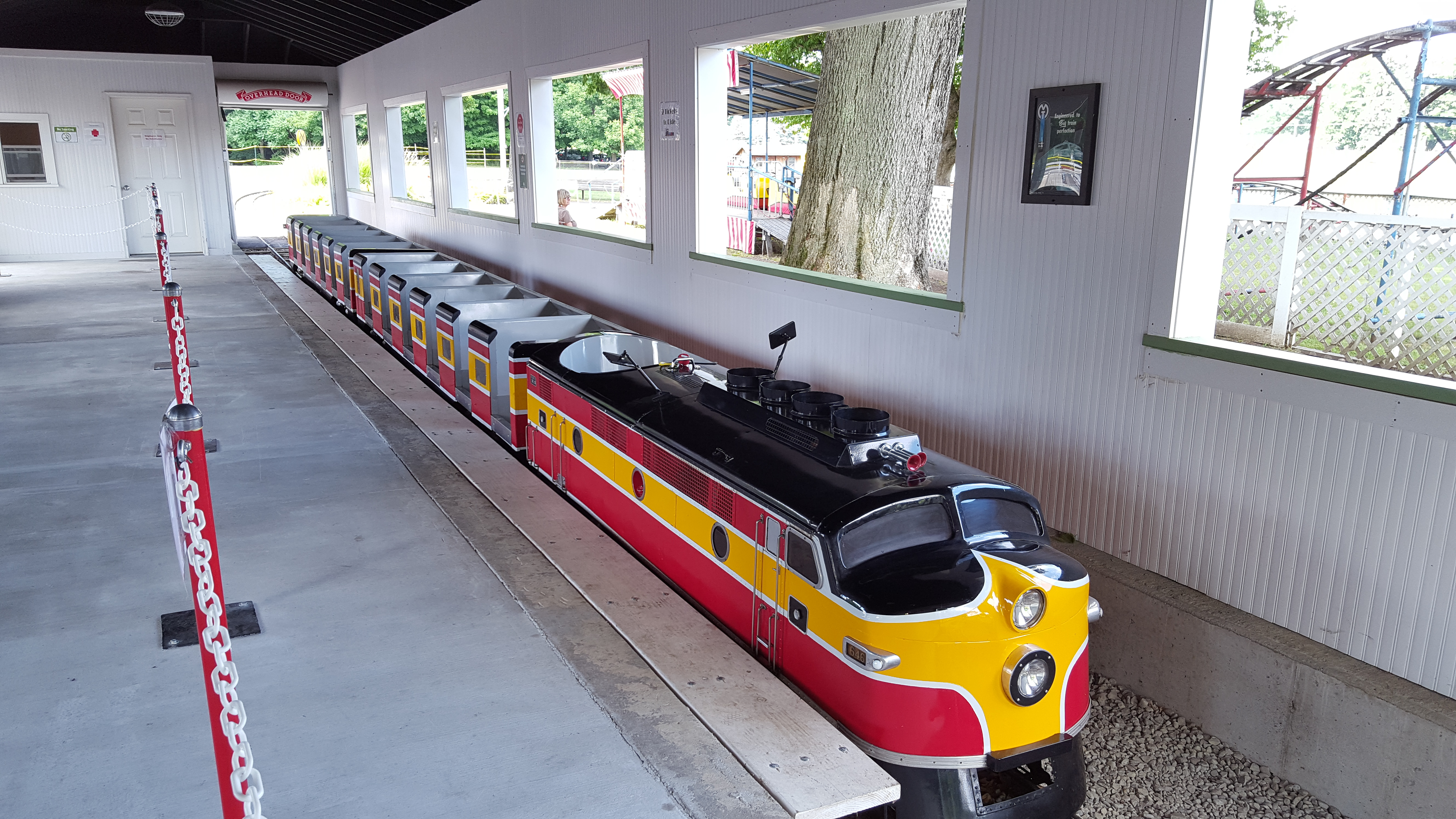
Midway Train 2016 in the new station house (2015)

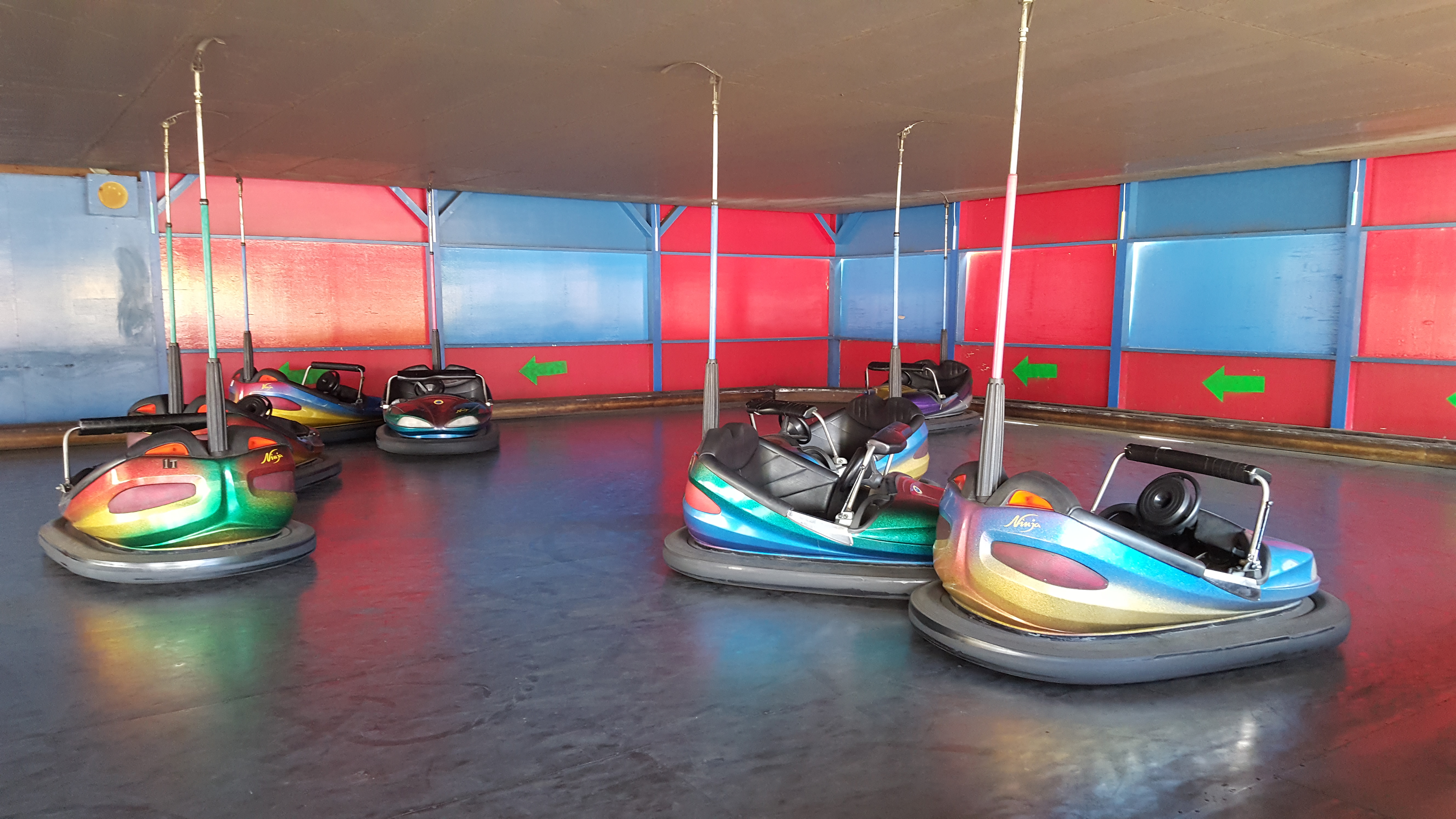
Midway Bumper Cars 2016

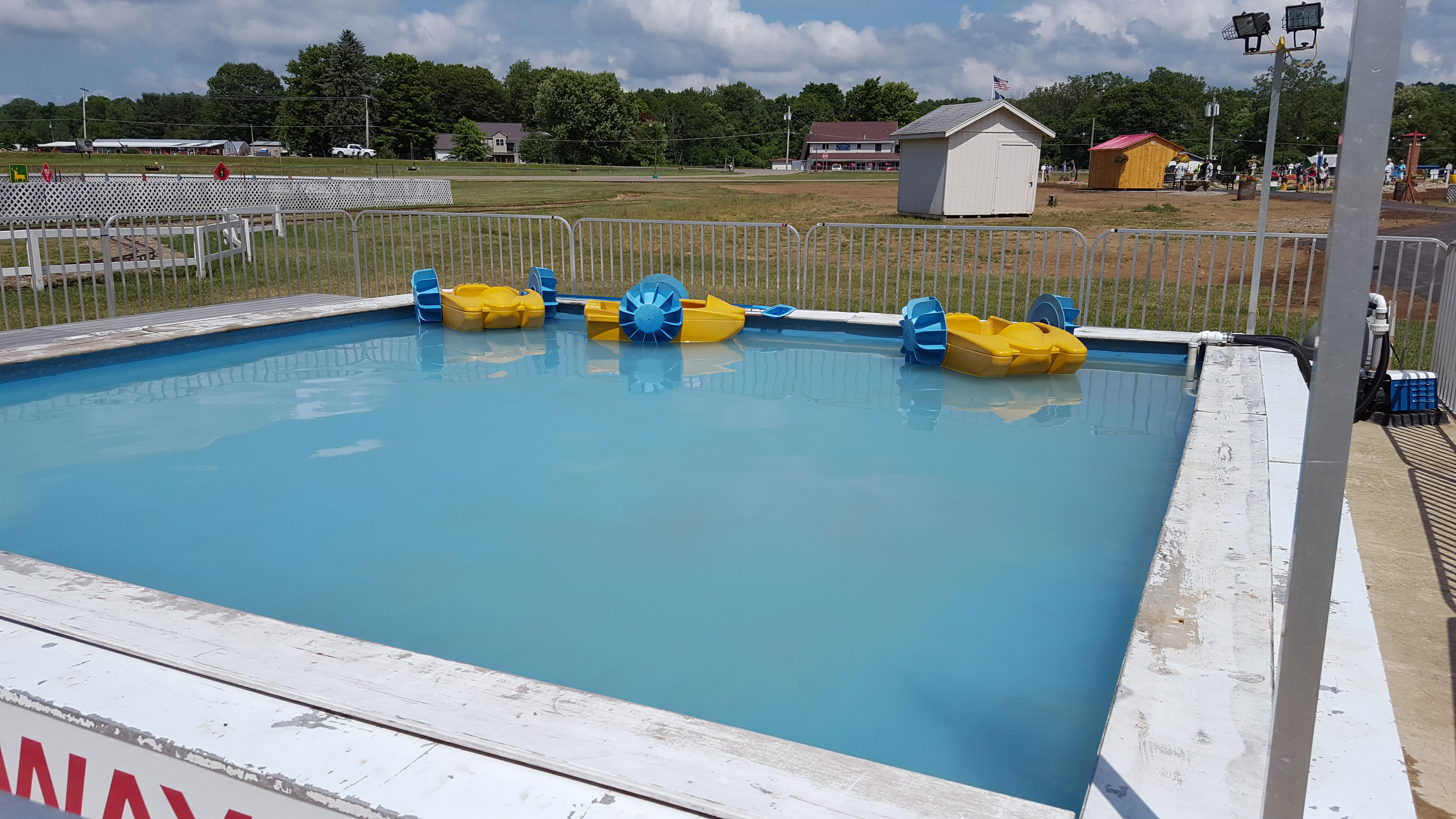
Midway Tugboat Paddlers 2016

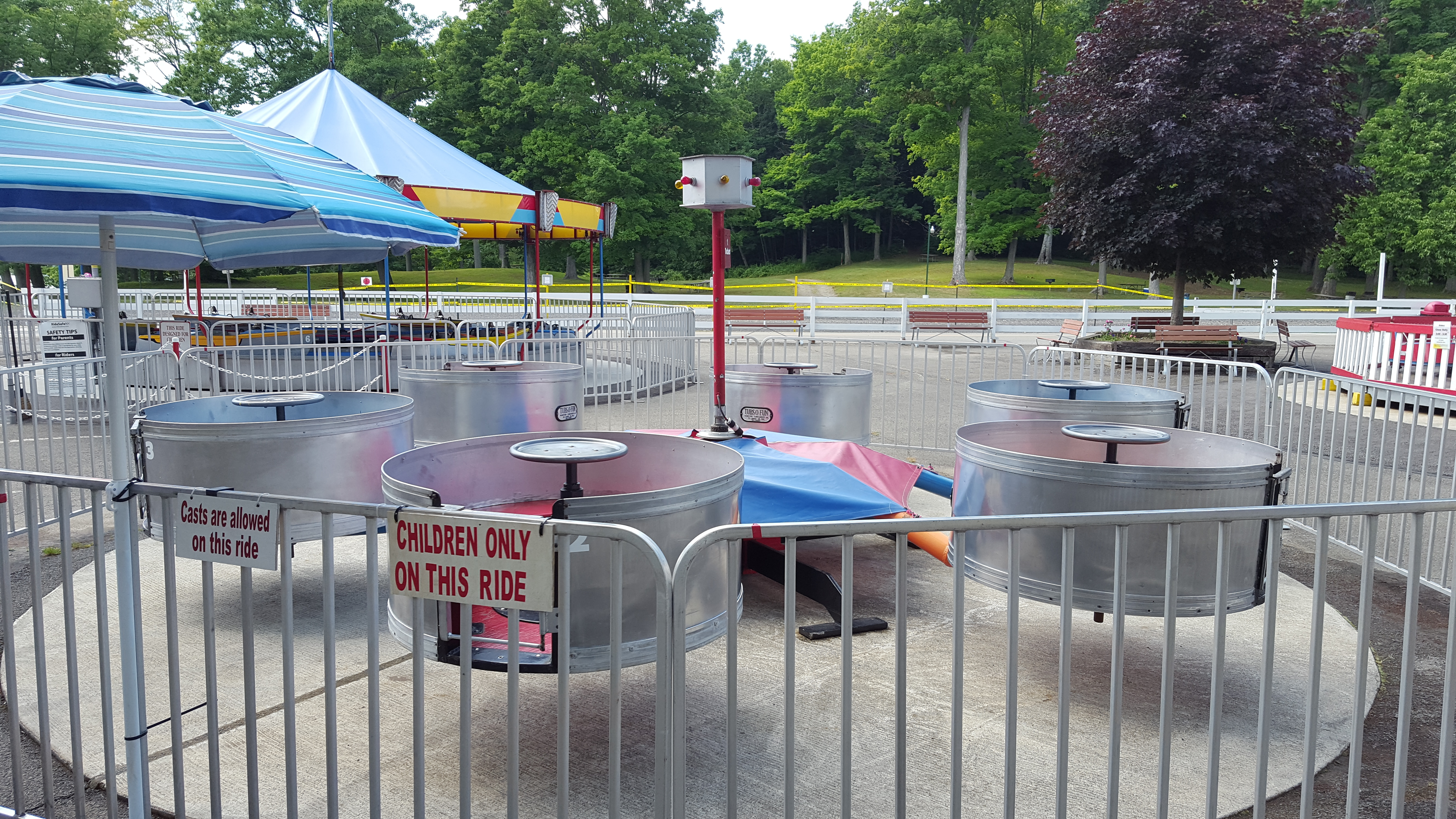
Midway Tubs of Fun 2016

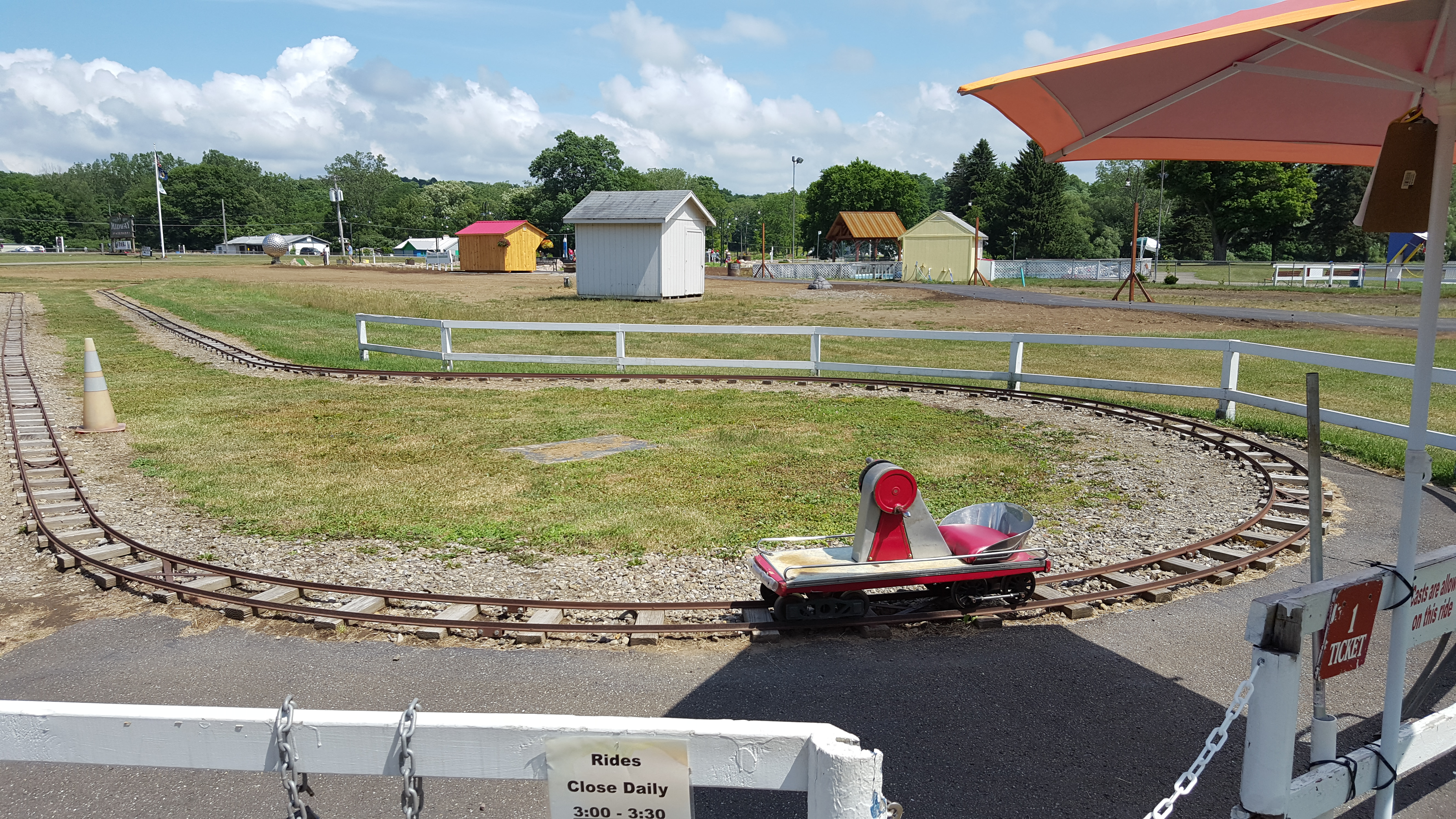
Midway Handcars 2016

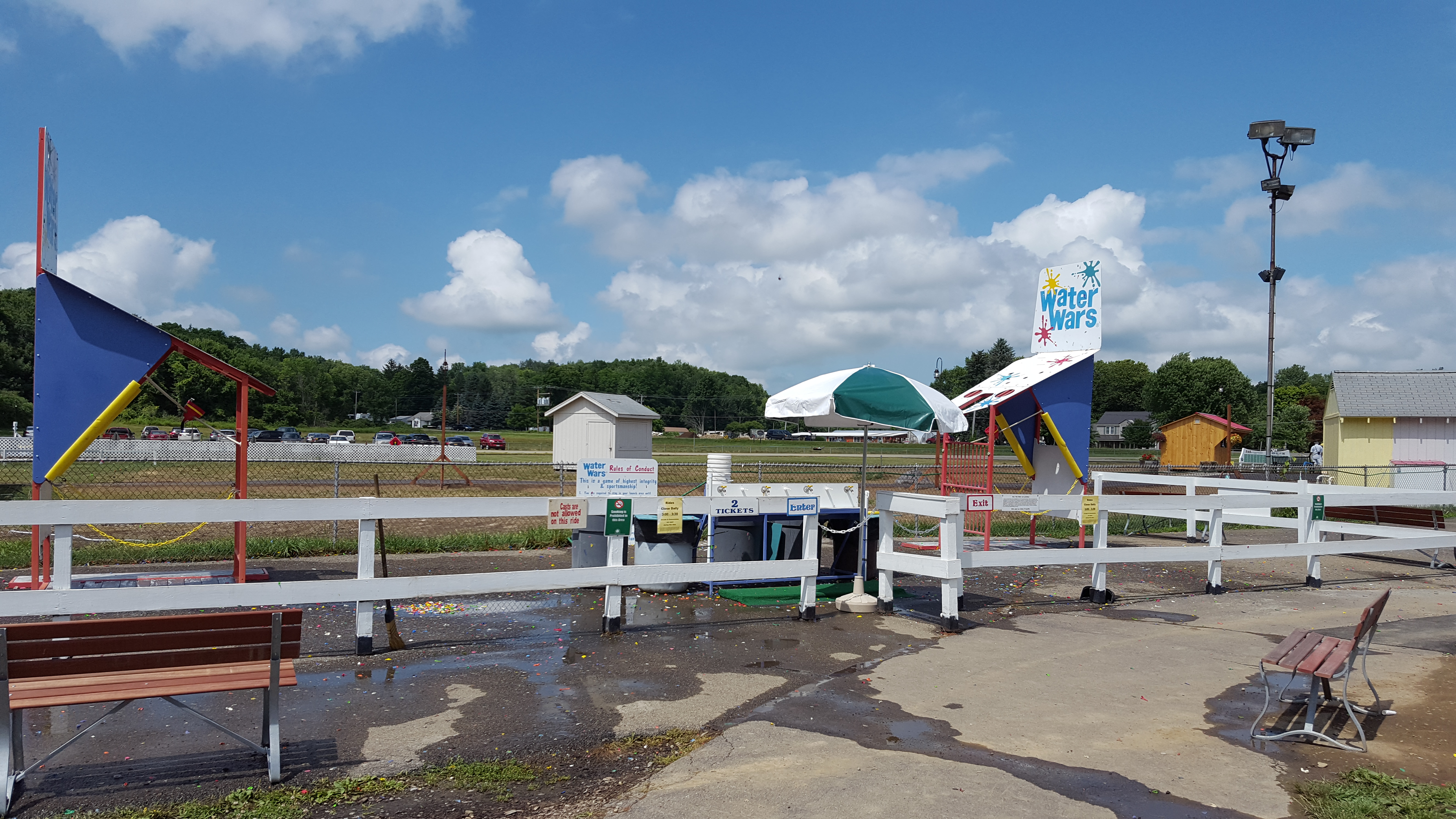
Midway Water Wars 2016
