= Mount Moor African-American Cemetery =

Historic cemetery in Rockland County, New York, US

- U.S. National Register of Historic Places
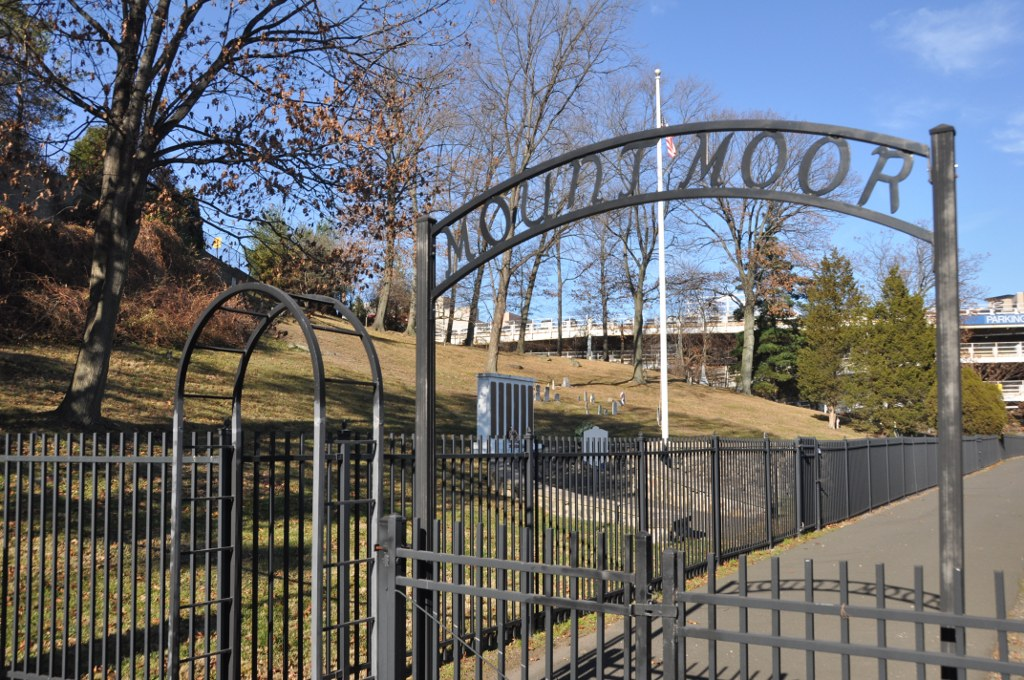

- Location within New York Location within the United States
- Location: Dexter Rd., off NY 54A, Clarkstown, New York
- Coordinates: 41°05′47″N 73°57′31″W
- Area: 3 acres (1.2 ha)
- Built: 1849
- NRHP reference No.: 94001001
- Added to NRHP: August 29, 1994

Mount Moor African-American Cemetery, also known as Mount Moor Cemetery, is a historic African American cemetery located at Palisades Center, West Nyack in Rockland County, New York. It was established in 1849 and contains approximately 90 known graves including veterans of the Civil War, Spanish-American War and World War I. Among the notable burials are Lafayette Logan, a Buffalo Soldier who fought with the 54th Massachusetts Infantry Regiment and several members of the 26th United States Colored Infantry Regiment.

According to the cemetery's records, Mount Moor dates to July 7, 1849 when James and Jane Benson deeded the land to William H. Moore, Stephen Samuels, and Issac Williams who were affiliated with what was known as the “Burying Ground for Colored People.” It expanded to incorporate a southern section in 1855 and was officially dedicated on May 1, 1965. It was listed on the National Register of Historic Places in 1994 and restored in 2021. It is now surrounded by the Palisades Center shopping mall and its parking lots.
