= Philadelphia Toboggan Company Carousel Number 15 =

- U.S. National Register of Historic Places
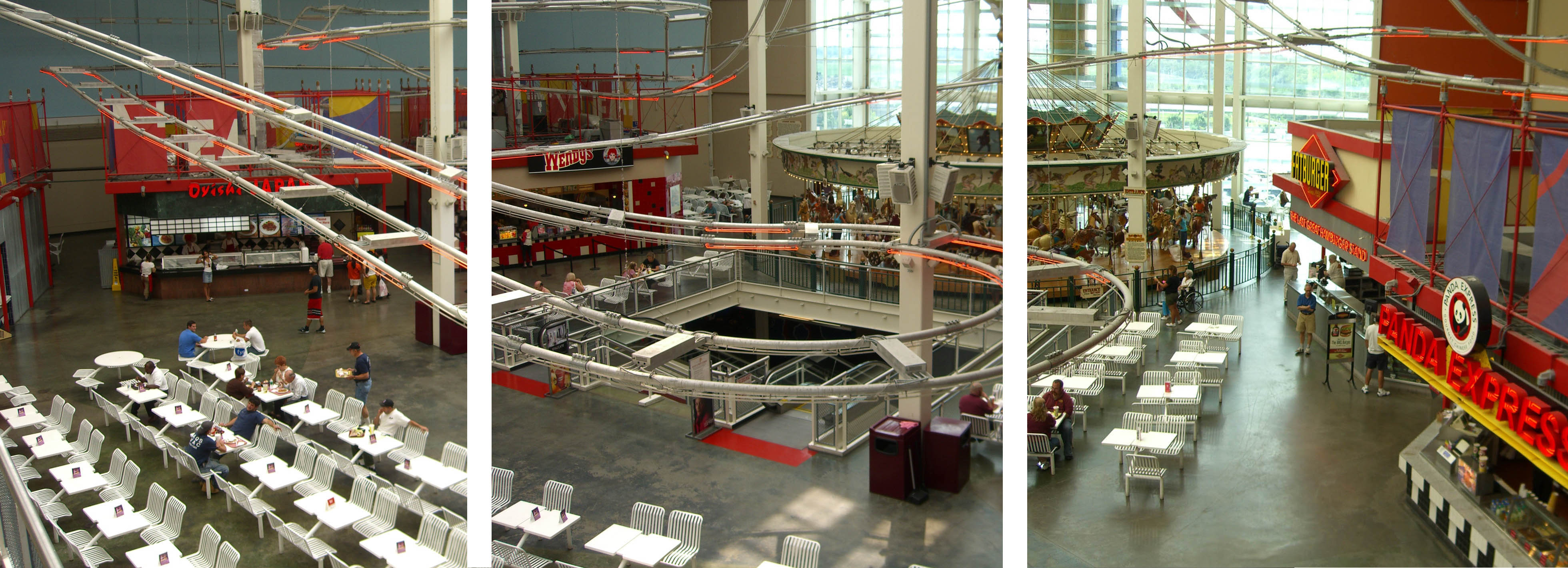
- The Philadelphia Toboggan Company Carousel Number 15 carousel as seen at Palisades Center mall in 2007 at the food court in the background
- Built: 1907
- Architect: Zoller, Leo; Philadelphia Toboggan Co.
- NRHP reference No.: 01000583
- Added to NRHP: June 8, 2001

Philadelphia Toboggan Company Carousel Number 15 is a carousel built in 1907 by the Philadelphia Toboggan Company and moved several times. Since 2009, it has been in storage in Portland, Oregon. The carousel is owned by the Perron family.

It measures 48 feet (15 m) in diameter and has a 26-foot (7.9 m) center pole. It has 56 jumping horses carved from basswood in four rows.

The carousel was originally set up at Fort George Amusement Park in Fort George, New York. In 1917, after the park had been closed for several years, the carousel moved to the new Summit Beach Amusement Park in Akron, Ohio. In 1958, Summit Beach closed and the carousel moved to State Fair Park in Milwaukee, Wisconsin, and later to DandiLion Park in Muskego, Wisconsin, where it remained until the park closed in 1976. In 1986, it was moved to Vancouver, British Columbia, for Expo 86. In 1990, the carousel was moved to the Puente Hills Mall in City of Industry, California. In 1998, The carousel was moved and reinstalled one last time in 1998 to the newly opened Palisades Center Mall in West Nyack, New York. In May 2009, mall management announced that the carousel would be disassembled and removed by June 14, 2009. In fall 2009, the carousel was replaced with a modern, two-floor, Venetian carousel made by Bertazzon of Italy and owned by Island Carousels.

The carousel was added to the National Register of Historic Places in 1979, removed in 1984 when it was moved outside the United States, and readded in 2001.

== See also ==
- Amusement rides on the National Register of Historic Places
