= Eldora Park =

Former amusement park in Washington, Pennsylvania, USA

Coordinates: 40.177°N 79.891°W

Eldora Park was an amusement park that opened in 1901 in Washington, Pennsylvania. It survived for three decades before closing in the 1940s.

== History ==
Eldora Park was located in the Black Diamond area of Carroll Township between Charleroi, Donora and Monongahela in Washington County. It was a stop on the Pittsburgh Railways Company's interurban trolley that ran from Roscoe to Pittsburgh. It was a popular location for outings for mine worker unions, schools, community associations, and family reunions. Land development began in 1901, headed by James A. Pahe. Steve Woodward, Guy Moffitt and Tom Sloan were financial backers credited with building the park on property formerly owned by the Wickerham family, one of the pioneer families in the area.

The park had a merry-go-round, a roller coaster, a motion picture tent called the Electric Theatre, slides, swings, picnic tables, a restaurant, and a dance pavilion. The park's Figure Eight roller coaster was designed by Frederick Ingersoll, a Pittsburgh native who designed and built several similar coasters, including one at Kennywood Park of the same name.

On July 9, 1905, Carrie Nation delivered two lectures at the park promoting the abstinence of alcohol usage. In a street car on her way to Pittsburgh from Eldora Park after her lectures, Nation caused a scene that was reported on in local newspapers. She ripped off, and tore to pieces, an advertisement for beer that originally read "Drunk by all nations" that had been altered by a practical joker to read "Drunk by Carrie nation".

The popularity of Eldora Park's amusement rides began to decline in the 1920s, while the dance hall continued to host big bands through the 1930s. Lawrence Welk, Frank Lombardo, and The Golden Gate Five (a popular local band) were among the headliners. The Great Depression, World War II, and declining ridership on the trolley line are all credited with attributing to the park's demise. The dance hall was used as a roller skating rink before the park closed in the 1940s.

The park was chartered to the Charleroi Girl Scouts in May of 1946. It opened as a day camp called Camp Charwood on June 19, 1946, and operated into the 1970s. After camp sites were built in the woods on the property, Camp Charwood saw overnight camping as well. The dance hall, now known as Great Hall, was also used by the Girl Scouts for roller skating and, in bad weather, various other activities.
