= Puritas Springs Park =

Amusement park in Cleveland, Ohio

- Interactive map of Puritas Springs Park
- Location: Cleveland, Ohio, United States
- Coordinates: 41.435075°N 81.838474°W
- Status: Defunct
- Opened: 1900
- Closed: 1958
- Owner: John Gooding

Puritas Springs Park was an amusement park located in Cleveland, Ohio, overlooking the Rocky River Valley. It opened around the dawn of the 20th century and operated until financial difficulties led to its closure in 1958. The land on which it once stood is now home to a residential development.

== History ==
=== Puritas Springs bottling ===
The land on which the amusement park would eventually be built was originally developed by the Cleveland, Berea, Elyria & Oberlin Railway. In the mid 1890s, the company purchased land in the area and began to bottle and sell water from the local springs

=== Establishment and early days ===
The railway company and Albert Akins, its vice president, soon made plans to create a park at the Puritas Springs site. They hoped to attract guests to the area and profit from increased rail ticket sales. The Cleveland, Berea, Elyria, and Oberlin Railway began service to the park gates on June 10, 1900. In the early days, the Puritas Springs did not include a merry-go-round, a Ferris Wheel, or other staple attractions of more modern amusement parks; like many parks of the time, it provided simpler amenities, such as a dance hall, camp sites and picnic areas.

=== Transformation ===
John Gooding was a very important figure in the history of the park, though sources disagree on whether Gooding founded the park or became involved around 1908. He owned the park outright by the end of 1915 and directed many changes until his death in the 1930s.

John Gooding began to transform the park by installing mechanized rides such as merry go rounds. In 1922, seven years after acquiring the park, he installed an enclosed roller skating rink, which featured a band organ. 1927 saw the installation of the Cyclone, a roller coaster designed by coaster pioneer John Miller. The Cyclone opened on June 10, 1928, and soon became the park's main attraction. Gooding died in the mid 1930s, but the park remained under the ownership of his family until its closure.

=== Closure and fire ===
In 1958, high insurance prices and increasing residential development in the area, combined with a decline in attendance, led to the sale of Puritas Springs Park to residential developers. Less than a year after the closure, a fire destroyed much of the park. The cause of the fire was never determined.

=== After closure ===
In spite of the fire and years of decay, parts of the park, including some of the famous Cyclone roller coaster, remained. A commemorative plaque funded by West Park Historical Society and The Ohio History Connection stands at the site of the park's original entrance

== Attractions ==
=== Dance halls ===
Throughout its history, Puritas Springs featured three different dance halls, the first two of which were destroyed by fire. The original dance hall opened in 1900 and burned down ten years later. The second opened in 1911 and featured a high ceiling, a bandstand, and a balcony. In 1946, it, too, was lost to fire. The third and final dance hall was an open-air structure and was not nearly as full-featured as the second dance hall.

=== Roller rink ===
The roller skating rink at Puritas Springs was erected in 1922. It featured a band organ and was widely popular.

=== Cyclone ===
The Cyclone was the most famous attraction at Puritas Springs. It was designed by John Miller in 1927 and made significant use of the terrain. Rumors greatly exaggerated its speed, which was actually about 50–55 miles per hour, but it was still the tallest and fastest in the Cleveland area at the time. The coaster was widely considered dangerous, and, in fact, several people claimed to have suffered injuries while riding it. The park modified the Cyclone in 1946 to make the initial drop and subsequent ascent less intense.
