= Palisades Center =

Shopping mall in West Nyack, New York

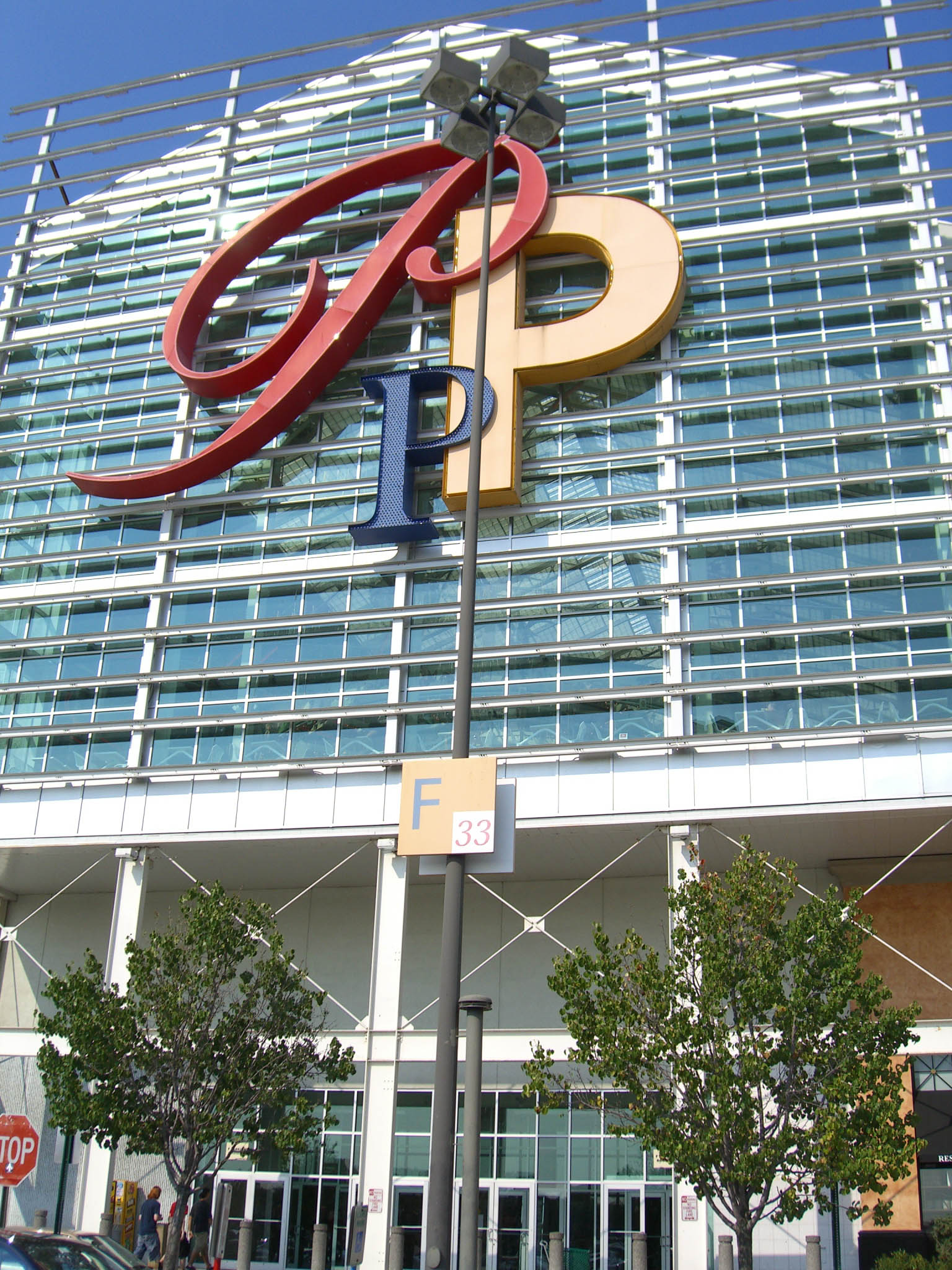
- Palisades Center entrance, 2007
- Location: West Nyack, New York
- Coordinates: 41.0973°N 73.9561°W
- Address: 1000 Palisades Center Drive
- Opened: March 4, 1998
- Developer: The Pyramid Companies
- Manager: Spinoso Real Estate Group
- Owner: Black Diamond Management
- Architect: Del Pos Architects, Law Kingdon Inc.
- Num. of stores: 218
- Num. of anchor tenants: 4 at opening
- Floor area: 2,217,322 sq ft (205,996 m^{2})
- Floors: 4
- Parking: 18,000+ parking spaces
- Public transit: Rockland Coaches bus routes: 20 & 49J; Hudson Link buses: H01, H03, H05, H07, H07X; Transport of Rockland bus routes: 59, 91, 92, 97
- Website: palisadescenter.com

Palisades Center is a shopping mall in West Nyack, New York, which as of December 2022, was the twelfth-largest in the United States by gross leasable space. It has also been one of the nation's most lucrative malls, producing $40 million in annual sales tax and $17 million in property taxes in its first ten years of operation.

Built in the industrial style, the mall was developed by Pyramid Management Group, and opened in March 1998. It was named after the nearby Palisades, which border the Hudson River and the eastern part of Rockland County. It is bounded on three sides by major state routes: the New York State Thruway (Interstates 87 and 287) to the north (Exit 12), NY Route 303 to the east, and NY Route 59 to the south. It is also located near the Thruway's intersection of the Palisades Interstate Parkway, and is only a few miles west of the Tappan Zee Bridge, which provides access from points east of the Hudson River..

In February of 2026 the mall was purchased at auction by a marketing agency named Black Diamond Management for $175 million dollars.

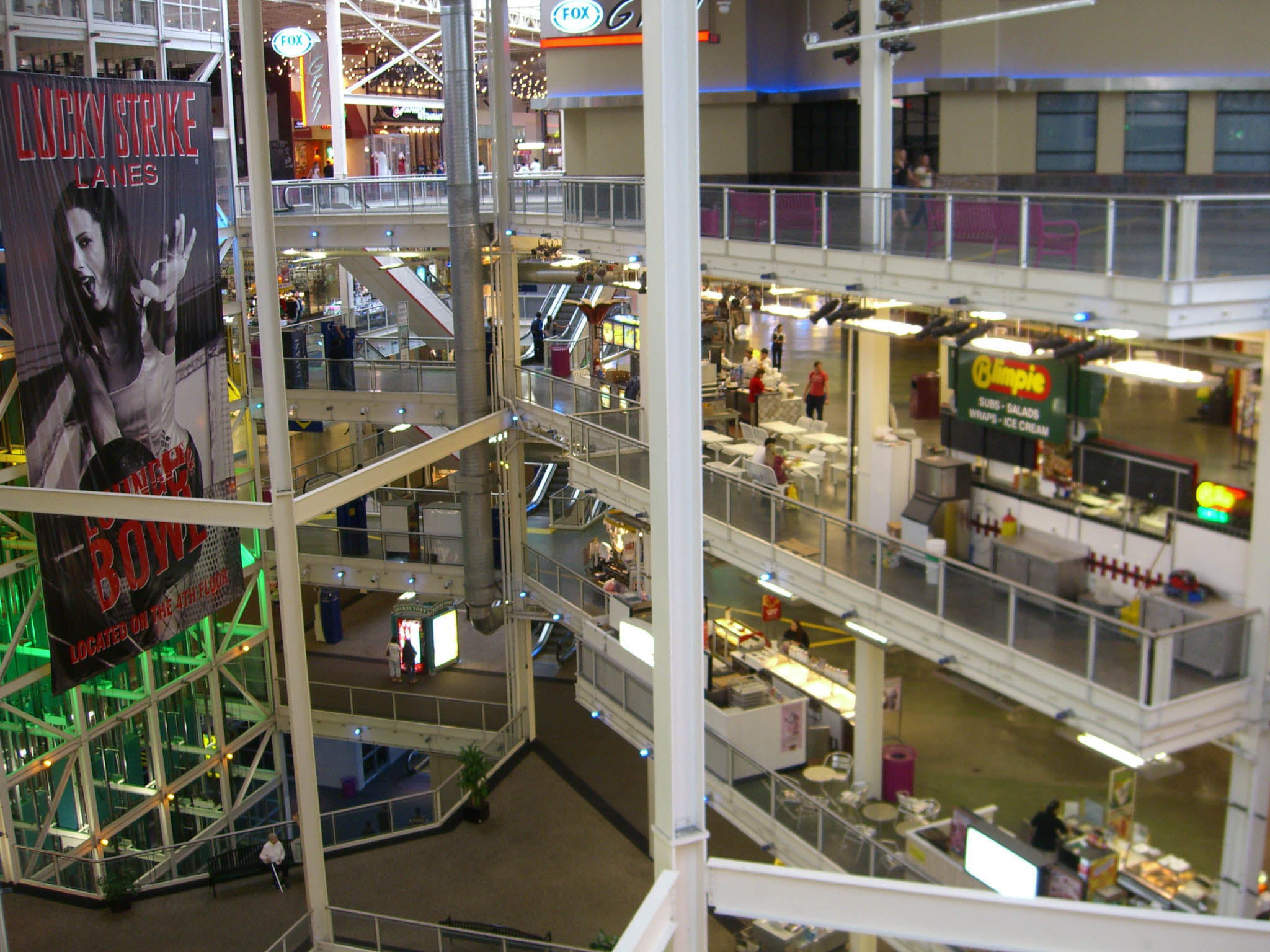
The mall spans four floors.

== History ==
=== 1990s ===
According to the mall's sponsoring partner, Thomas Valenti, it took 16 years to get the mall approved and built. The 130-acre site was purchased by The Pyramid Companies for about $3 million and a promise to clean up the two landfills, which held incinerator ash and garbage. The 875,000-square-foot (81,300 m^{2}) mall was proposed in 1985 with a goal of luring upscale retailers such as Saks Fifth Avenue and Lord & Taylor, and also a promise to keep sales tax dollars from slipping across state lines into New Jersey. The site was selected for its proximity to the New York State Thruway and Westchester County. Its location four miles from New Jersey, where blue laws in Paramus keep the malls closed on Sundays, was also a factor. Local residents, recalling how the Nanuet Mall nearly drew the life out of Rockland County's traditional shopping villages about 20 years earlier, opposed the mall, predicting that it would bring crime, increased traffic, air pollution, and an economic downturn to the area's downtowns, and that the site was not properly tested for toxins. In October 1993, ground was broken on the mall, whose construction would cost between $250 million and $280 million.

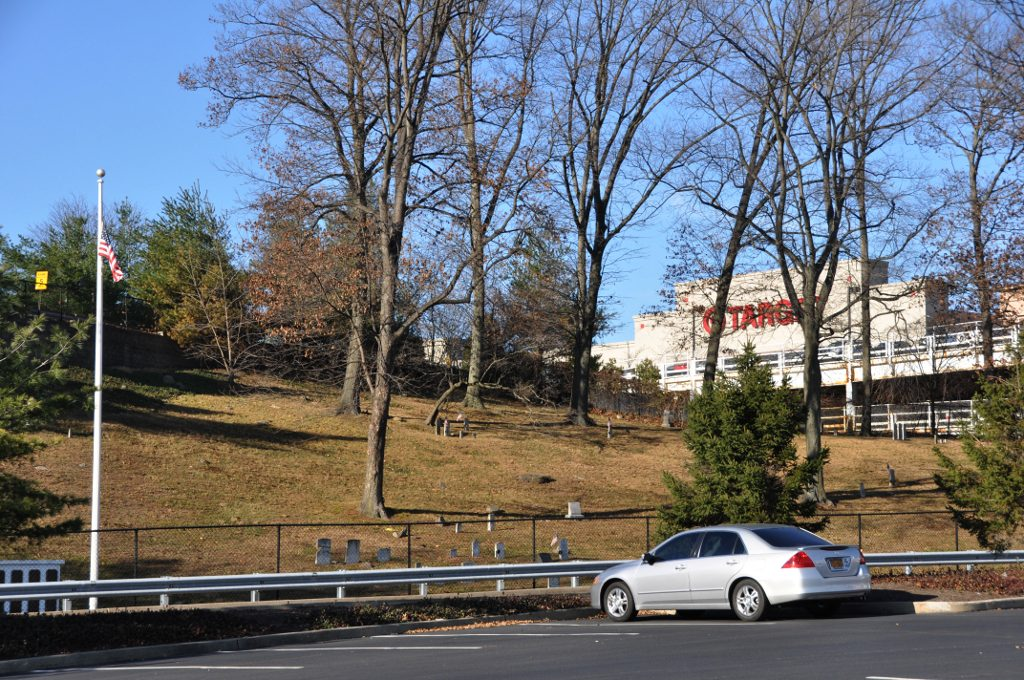
The Mount Moor Cemetery. The mall is visible to the right.

The Palisades Center was built around the Mount Moor Cemetery, a cemetery established in 1849 for people of color, including Native American and African American veterans of American wars from the Civil War to the Korean War. The cemetery is visible from a number of points in the mall, and was undisturbed by construction.

The Historical Society of Rockland County placed a historical sign which reads:

This burying ground for Colored people, was deeded on July 7, 1849 by James Benson. and Jane Benson. his wife to William H. Moore, Stephen Samuels and Isaac Williams. trustees. The cemetery has provided burial space for colored people, including veterans of the American Civil War, the Spanish–American War, World Wars l and ll and the Korean War. The grounds have been maintained since 1940 by the Mount Moor Cemetery Association, Inc.

The construction of the mall faced a number of environmental obstacles before it began. What was initially thought to be a mastodon buried there turned out to be a circus elephant. Nesting grounds for a nearly extinct red-legged partridge turned out to be a domesticated pheasant. Other problems included flooding from one of the region's glacier-dug bottom spots and runoff from three landfills on the property.

The mall was completed in December 1997 and opened on March 4, 1998. Initially the mall had four anchor stores. The number fluctuated over the years as new anchors opened and closed, peaking at 16 in the 2010s. A few of the stores that were present in the mall in its first year were the WNET Store of Knowledge, the Nickelodeon Store, and Record Town.

From its inception, rumors circulated that the mall's underground parking lot was sinking because it was built on unstable swampland, and that it would collapse under its own weight.

=== 2000s ===
Rumors that the mall would close abounded after the 1999-2000 holiday season. On the January 6, 2000, episode of The Rosie O'Donnell Show, host Rosie O'Donnell, who lives in Nyack, mentioned the rumor of the building's sinking to her audience. Local police, town engineering officials and the mall's developers assured the public that these stories were false and that the mall was safe and in no danger of closing. A managing partner of the mall, Thomas J. Valenti, appeared on a later episode of O'Donnell's show, performing a song-and-dance number to the tune of "Cheek to Cheek" to debunk the rumors of the mall sinking.

On November 5, 2002, voters in Clarkstown voted on a referendum in which the mall requested approval for it to lease 100,000 square feet (9,300 square meters) of theretofore unoccupied space, in keeping with a 1997 covenant in which Pyramid Companies agreed any additional leasing would be decided by a town referendum as part of a deal that let the mall take over three town streets. Opponents argued that Pyramid Companies had previously stated that this space had no practical use when they had built beyond the original 1.8 million square feet (170,000 square meters) they were allowed, but Pyramid insisted that they did not wish to expand beyond the limits of the mall, but rather to lease space already in the building, which would be occupied by Kids City, an educational and recreational center for children ages 3 to 12. Nicole Doliner, president of the Rockland Civic Association, characterized Kids City as a theme park. Voters rejected the measure by a 2-1 margin.

In 2008, opponents of the mall complained that the Superfund site located on the property was paved over rather than cleaned, and that the mall tax receipts failed to lower the average homeowner's bill as advertised. In the 2008 documentary Megamall mall opponent Bruce Broadley said, "Everything we said would happen happened. Go back and look at all the proposals and drawings. It's a vastly different mall that was built. It was sold as upscale. What they built is arguably one of the ugliest malls in America." However, Clarkstown Town Board member Shirley Lasker, who opposed the mall, said in 2008 that the board's concerns over traffic did not materialize. Valenti said that the $23-million effort to fix area roads and create a special exit for the mall on the Thruway prevented the predicted traffic congestion. Columnist Greg Clary argued that aesthetics are subjective, that average homeowners' bills did not go down due to continued spending by elected officials, and that while the downtowns were hurt by the mall, this is not unique to the area, and can be averted by town planners who represent some of the mall's 20 million patrons. The New York Times writer Joe Queenan criticized the mall's Brutalist exterior as lacking design and theme and characterized its rectangular layout as "a series of interlocking coffins." He also criticized the "trash gondolas" visible near the Interstate 287 entrance. Queenan had kinder things to say about the mall's vast interior, likening its sprawling floors to a retail version of Centre Georges Pompidou, analogizing its amalgamated structure to the "Gotham skyline," and lauding the bowling alley, ice rink, and food court Ferris wheel for giving people an opportunity to play "adult hooky."

In 2009, the mall replaced its historic 19th-century carousel from Venice, Italy, with a modern doubler-decker model.

=== 2010s ===
On May 3, 2013, Pyramid officials announced that Palisades Center would undergo a multimillion-dollar remodeling from May to December that year in order to give a more upscale appearance to the mall, which had begun to show signs of wear and tear. The renovation brought a warmer color scheme to soften the institutional beige of the mall, colored glass mosaics, ceiling facets, and designer lighting. The four-story court at the center of the mall received glass handrails and architectural lighting elements, and the "ThEATery" area on Level 4 got new tile floors and chandelier fixtures. Other areas received soft seating, custom planters, and plush carpets.

In 2016, Pyramid Companies received a $388.5 million mortgage on the property. The following year, the mall was at full occupancy.

The late 2010s saw several traditional chain anchors update their brick-and-mortar fleets, due to competition by digital retailers in recent years.

On March 17, 2017, JCPenney announced that their Palisade Center location would be one of 138 of its stores to close as part of its modernization of its brick-and-mortar operations.

In September 2019, it was reported that the Lord & Taylor store at Palisades Center would be closing, with Clarkstown Councilman Donald Franchino explaining that the mall needed to diversify in its pursuit of moving toward a greater a mixture of retail and entertainment.

=== 2020–present ===
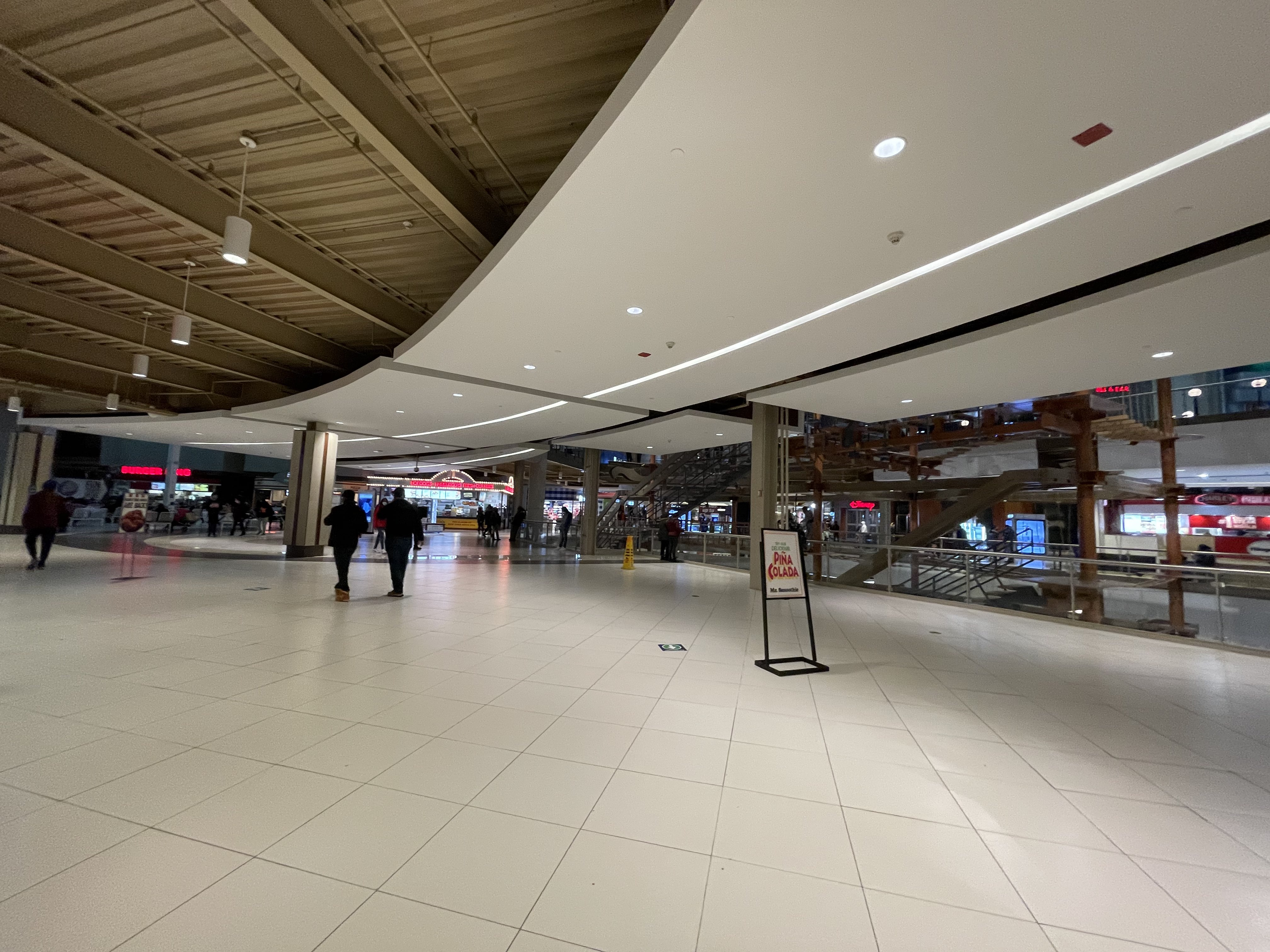
The mall in 2021

The mall temporarily closed as a result of the COVID-19 pandemic, and suffered financially as a result of that crisis. By July 2020, Pyramid Companies missed mortgage payments since the prior April, and had risked defaulting on its $388.5 million CMBS loan, but reached an agreement with its lenders to avoid foreclosure.

In October 2020, Clarkstown held a referendum in which citizens were asked to vote on whether to lift the agreement made between the town and the mall's developer in 1998 preventing the mall from renting out 200,000 square feet (19,000 m^{2}) of unused space in its fourth-floor attic, whose high-ceilings the mall believed would be more appealing to a wide array of possible tenants than adapting former anchor store space. That expansion was approved November 4, 2020.

That December, the data firm Trepp appraised Palisades Center at $425 million, which was less than half of the $881 million at which the mall was valued in 2016, when Pyramid Companies received a $388.5 million mortgage on the property.

In March 2021, the Rockland County Business Journal reported that the mall, which was in a state of transition exacerbated by the COVID-19 pandemic, would likely not replace the former Lord & Taylor and JC Penney with other department stores or retail. Stephen J. Congel, CEO of Pyramid Management Group, which manages the Palisades Center, pointed to the company's portfolio-wide diversification strategy, in which it incorporated new uses, such as residential developments, to its existing assets, though Congel did not comment when asked if residential projects were planned for Palisades Center.

In early January 2022, Picanha Brazilian Steakhouse opened a location at the mall, which following the success of their first two locations in Philadelphia, marked the beginning of that chain's expansion across the United States.

On February 10, 2023, Wilmington Trust, the trustee on the $418.5 million mortgage issued in April 2016, filed a commercial mortgage foreclosure complaint in New York State Supreme Court. The complaint came after mall's owners missed payments on both a deal that extended the maturity date of the mortgage to October 9, 2022 and a forbearance agreement extending the payment date to November 9, 2022.

In August 2024, a receiver was appointed to further oversee the foreclosure process and on April 9, 2025 a summary judgement was awarded to Wilmington Trust.

In October 2025, the mall's underlying debt was purchased by Black Diamond Capital Management however, at a significant discount showing the further decline of the mall and inability to fill vacant anchor retail space along with redevelopment without the mall being fully sold off. While currently under receivership, the mall is managed by Spinoso Real Estate Group with Pyramid Management Group being forced to let go off the mall completely.

== Layout and attractions ==
The mall has four floors, which at its opening housed over 220 businesses under a 1-million-square-foot (93,000-square-meter) roof, as well as 8,500 parking spaces on the property's 2-million-square-foot (190,000-square-meter), a space large enough to fit 40 White Houses. To accommodate its customers and tenants, the mall houses 40 escalators, eight passenger elevators, and 11 freight elevators.

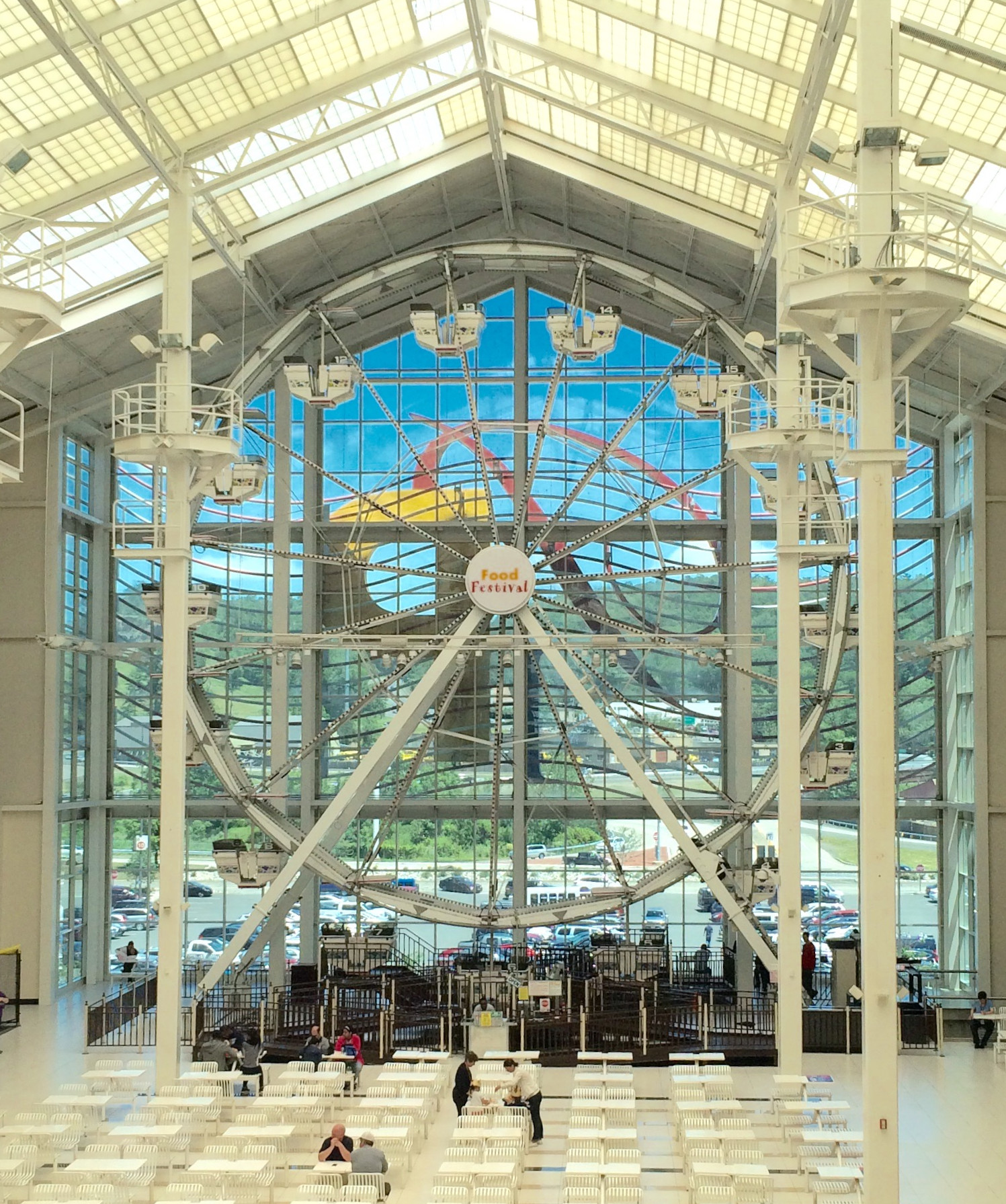
The Ferris wheel

The third floor of the mall contains a 2,000-seat food court with over a dozen quick-service restaurants, and a 60 ft (18 m) Ferris wheel. That level formerly housed Philadelphia Toboggan Company Carousel Number 15, a carousel built in 1907, and listed on the National Register of Historic Places in 2001. In May 2009, mall management announced that the then-101-year-old carousel would be disassembled and removed the following month. It was replaced by a modern, double-decker Venetian carousel. In October 2021, The Journal News reported that ClimbZone would replace the Venetian Carousel.

On the fourth floor is a stadium-seating 21-screen AMC Theatres, that previously held a separate IMAX theater. Since 2016, the former IMAX site is home to 5 Wits Interactive Family Entertainment Center.

At the east end of the fourth floor is an ice rink, which is home to teams and programs that include the Palisades Predators Youth Hockey team and BUDS for Hockey. The rink also houses a free skate and Learn to Skate program, an arcade (which at one point had Sonic Championship), and a party room for birthday parties. The fourth floor is also the entry to Palisades Climb Adventure, a five-level, 85 ft (26 m) climbing obstacle course created by WonderWorks that allows guests to climb on obstacles while strapped into a harness.

== In popular culture ==
The mall was featured in multiple episodes of the TruTV series Impractical Jokers. It was used for exterior shots in the 2018 film Eighth Grade and can be seen as a backdrop in the 2019 film Hustlers.
