= White City =

White City may refer to:

== Places ==
=== Australia ===
- White City, Perth, an amusement park on the Perth foreshore
- White City railway station, a former railway station
- White City Stadium (Sydney), a tennis centre in Sydney
- White City FC, a football club based in Adelaide, South Australia

=== Azerbaijan ===
- Baku White City

=== Canada ===
- White City, Saskatchewan

=== France ===
- White City, a British front sector near Hawthorn Ridge Redoubt during the Battle of the Somme in 1916

=== Israel ===
- White City (Tel Aviv), a World Heritage Site

=== United Kingdom ===
- White City, London
  - White City Stadium
  - White City Greyhounds
  - White City tube station
  - White City (ward)
  - Westfield London, a shopping development formerly known as "White City"
  - White City Place, a set of buildings including the BBC Media Village and BBC Television Centre
- White City, Gloucester
- White City, Greater Manchester, a retail park, formerly botanical gardens and stadium
- White City, Isle of Man
- White City, Scotland, a section of Ayr
- White City Stadium, Cardiff, a former greyhound stadium
- White City Stadium, Glasgow, a former greyhound and speedway stadium
- White City Stadium (Liverpool), a former greyhound stadium
- White City Stadium (Manchester) a former stadium on the White City site
- White City Stadium (Newcastle), a former greyhound stadium by Scotswood Bridge
- White City Stadium (Nottingham), a former greyhound and speedway stadium
- White City, Swansea Greyhound Track, a former independent greyhound track

=== United States ===
==== Cities and neighborhoods ====
- White City, Florida (disambiguation)
- White City, Illinois
- White City, Kansas
- White City, Kentucky
- White City, a neighborhood in Forest Hills, Boston, Massachusetts
- White City Historic District, a neighborhood in Tulsa, Oklahoma
- White City, Oregon
- White City, Texas, a ghost town in Gaines County, Texas
- White City, Utah
- White City, Wisconsin

==== Amusement parks ====
- White City (amusement parks)
- Lakeside Amusement Park or White City, Denver, Colorado
- White City (Chicago), a recreational park in Illinois, 1905–1946
- The White City, an "ideal city" constructed for the 1893 World's Columbian Exposition in Chicago, Illinois
- White City (Indianapolis), an amusement in Indiana, 1906–1908
- White City (New Orleans), an amusement park in Louisiana, 1907–1913
- White City (Shrewsbury, Massachusetts), an amusement park, 1905–1960
- White City (Philadelphia), an amusement park in Pennsylvania, 1898–1912
- White City (Bellingham), an amusement park in Washington, 1906–1919

=== Cities known as "The White City" ===
- Arequipa, Peru
- Baicheng, China
- Belgorod, Russia
- Belgrade, Serbia
- Bely Gorod, the central core area of Moscow, Russia
- Biograd (disambiguation), multiple places
- Chicago, Illinois, United States
- Mérida, Yucatán, Mexico
- Nicosia (leuke ousia or white estate), Cyprus
- Ostuni, Italy
- Popayán, Colombia
- Sucre, Bolivia
- Spitak, Armenia

== Music ==
- White City (band), a rock band based in Kabul, Afghanistan
- White City: A Novel, a 1985 album by Pete Townshend
- "White City", a song by the Pogues from Peace and Love
- "White City", a song by Thomas Dolby from The Flat Earth
- "(White City)", a song by Handsome Furs from Face Control

== Other uses ==
- Minas Tirith or White City, fictional capital of Gondor in Middle-earth
- White City, a fictional venue in Pokémon Stadium 2
- La Ciudad Blanca (The White City), a legendary city in Honduras
- White City, a 2021 novel by Kevin Power
