= Belgorod (disambiguation) =

Belgorod is a city in Russia.

Belgorod may also refer to:

- Russian submarine Belgorod (K-329)
- 9612 Belgorod, a minor planet

== See also ==
- Belgrade
- Bilhorod (disambiguation)
- White City
