= Cyclone (Lakeside Amusement Park) =

Roller coaster at Lakeside Amusement Park

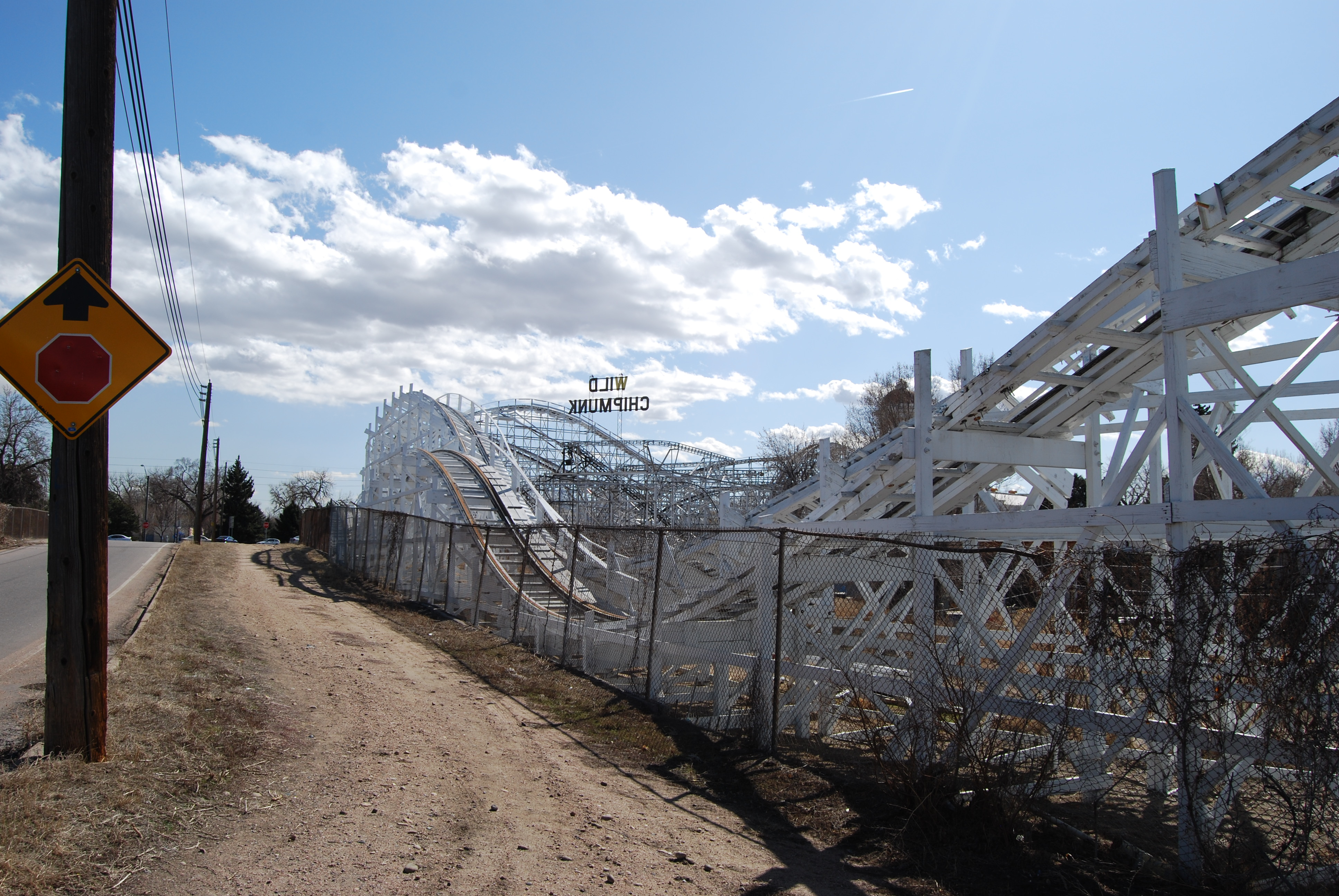

Lakeside Amusement Park
- Location: Lakeside Amusement Park
- Coordinates: 39.7808°N 105.0540°W
- Status: Closed

General statistics
- Type: Wood
- Designer: Edward A. Vettel
- Track layout: Terrain
- Lift/launch system: Chain lift hill
- Height: 90 ft (27 m)
- Drop: 89 ft (27 m)
- Length: 2,800 ft (850 m)
- Speed: 55 mph (89 km/h)
- Inversions: 0
- Duration: 2:00
- Max vertical angle: 50°
- Capacity: 1,100 riders per hour
- Height restriction: 42 in (107 cm)
- Trains: 2 trains with 5 cars; riders arranged 2 across in 2 rows for a total of 20 riders per train
- Cyclone at RCDB

Cyclone is a wooden roller coaster located at Lakeside Amusement Park in Lakeside, Colorado. Designed by Edward A. Vettel, the coaster opened in 1940, and is the last coaster he designed to remain standing. The ride notably features manually operated handbrakes, rather than automatic brakes.

The ride has not operated since 2022. The park has not provided any information about its reopening, stating that the ride would stay closed indefinitely "due to maintenance".

Cyclone has been awarded the ACE Coaster Classic and Coaster Landmark statuses, which are given to historical roller coasters by the American Coaster Enthusiasts.

== Lawsuit ==
In July 2021, a man reportedly injured his wrist while riding the coaster after he struck a part of the track due to "a poor restraint system". The lawsuit was filed on April 1, 2022. The park declined to respond publicly per policy to "not comment on pending litigation".
