= White City (Shrewsbury, Massachusetts) =

Former amusement park

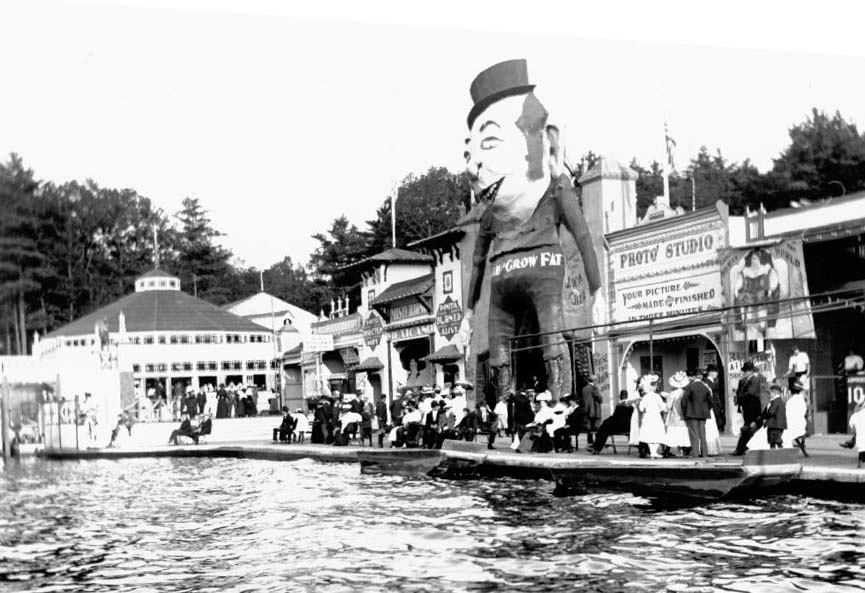
- White City in 1908. The colossal figure of "King Dodo" guards the entrance to the fun house.
- Interactive map of White City
- Location: Shrewsbury, Massachusetts, U.S.
- Coordinates: 42°16′23.42″N 71°45′8.89″W
- Status: Defunct
- Opened: 1905
- Closed: September 5, 1960

White City was an amusement park located in Shrewsbury, a suburb of Worcester, Massachusetts. It bordered Lake Quinsigamond and ran from 1905 to 1960.

== History ==
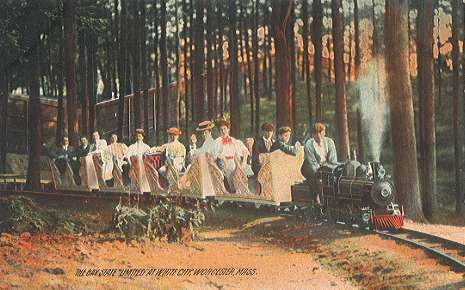
The "Bay State Limited" mini gauge railroad at White City

White City was founded by local businessman Horace H. Bigelow. The park opened on June 18, 1905 and was open for 55 seasons, closing for the last time on September 5, 1960. Its lifespan was atypical of American amusement parks of its day (most of which were short-lived, failing to survive past the onset of World War I). Like many such parks, White City was a trolley park, built at the end of a trolley line to increase ridership on weekends.

White City bordered Lake Quinsigamond and included the waters of the lake in some its attractions, such as boat rides, the "Whirl of Air Ships" ride which swung patrons out over the water, and trained diving horses. White City's other attractions were typical of parks of this type: a midway, a fun house, a penny arcade, concession stands, rides, sideshow acts, a roller coaster. White City also included a roller-skating rink, a ballroom, and a stage where musical acts and, later, pop stars (Paul Anka, Jerry Vale, Edie Gorme) performed.

The park's original roller coaster opened in 1914.. It was replaced by a world-class (at the time) coaster, the Zip, in 1928. The Zip, designed by Herbert Schenck, remained in service until the park's closing, although it was later renamed the Cyclone and later still the Yankee Clipper.

An early White City tagline was "Land of Fifty Thousand Electric Lights", which is sometimes cited as the source of the park's name, along with the white color of its structures. Most likely, though, the park was named for the famous White City at the 1893 Chicago World's Fair. "White City" was a popular name for amusement parks of the time, being borne by parks in Springfield (Missouri), Atlanta, Chicago, Cleveland, Indianapolis, New Haven, New Orleans, Syracuse (New York), London, Sydney, Melbourne, and other places as well.

Spag's discount department store, a regional fixture from 1934 to 2004, was located 0.5 miles (0.80 km) east of White City. After the park closed, the White City Plaza shopping center was built on part of the 18-acre (73,000 m^{2}) site.

== See also ==
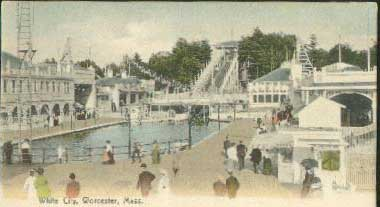
Postcard view of White City, 1907, showing the shoot-the-chutes ride (in the background) which ended in the water

- Lake Quinsigamond
- Lincoln Park
- List of amusement parks in New England
- List of defunct amusement parks

== Bibliography ==
- Perna, Michael Jr. Lake Quinsigamond and White City Amusement Park (Images of America series), Arcadia Publishing, 2004. ISBN 0-7385-3673-3
