= Hal Pearl =

Chicago based pianist and organist

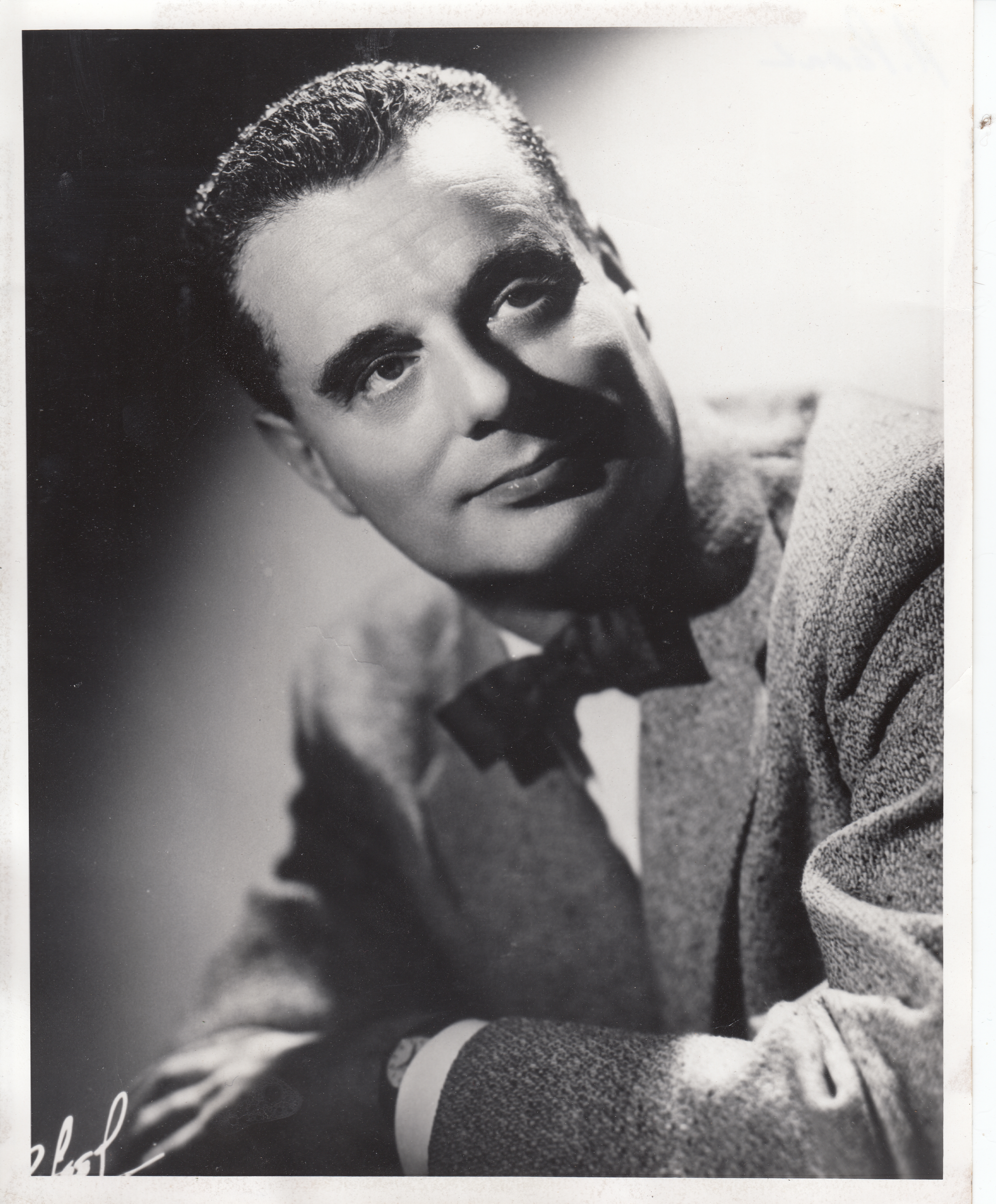
- Born: November 13, 1908; Chicago, United States
- Died: November 22, 2000 (aged 92); Chicago, United States
- Partner: Louise Rainey

Hal Pearl (November 13, 1908 – November 22, 2000) was a Chicago-based pianist and organist. He had an over 75-year performing career and probably was the last surviving silent movie accompanist. Initially a cinema organist, Hal Pearl was first known as "Chicago's Youngest Organist" and later "The King of the Organ."

Hal's concerts included his popular "sing-along" allowing audience participation with the lyrics being shown on the main screen. They always ended in a tongue twister so the audience couldn't complete the last song and ended up laughing. Hal had over 20,000 songs memorized and could play them as needed. He wrote his signature piece Let Come What May and released several records including Memories of the Aragon With Hal Pearl at The Mighty Wurlitzer and Singing Canaries.

== Early life ==
Hal Pearl was born in Chicago, Illinois at 41 E. Chestnut Street. He started playing the piano at age five, repeating music he heard from the silent film accompanists in the Nickelodeons located along Chicago's North Avenue. His father, a dentist who recognized Hal's childhood talent, paid for classical piano lessons and supported him in his music. Hal later was trained by the famed theater organist Jesse Crawford on the massive Wurlitzer pipe organ at the Chicago Theatre. When Hal began playing professionally, he changed his last name to "Pearl" thinking it had a more theatrical presentation. Because of Hal's growing fame, other family members started using the "Pearl" name at that time.

Hal attended Arnold School and then Waller High School (now Lincoln Park High School) in Chicago. He studied music at the University of Illinois Urbana-Champaign, where he had a job as the organist at the Virginia Theatre in downtown Champaign. He was forced to withdraw from the university due to family issues and later graduated from the Central YMCA College. The college had a campus in Chicago's Hyde Park neighborhood, which Hal could attend when he was working as the organist at the nearby White City Amusement Park.

== Musical career ==
Hal began playing professionally in late high school at various movie houses and dance halls. These included most of the movie houses of the time including the Midwest Theatre, the Trianon, Fox Sheridan, Granada, the Terminal, and others. He was often promoted as a "Boy Wonder" and as "Chicago's Youngest Organist."

At 25 years old, Hal was named the official organist of the Century of Progress, the 1933 Chicago World's Fair. During that time (and after), he was the organist at the White City Amusement Park on Chicago's south side.

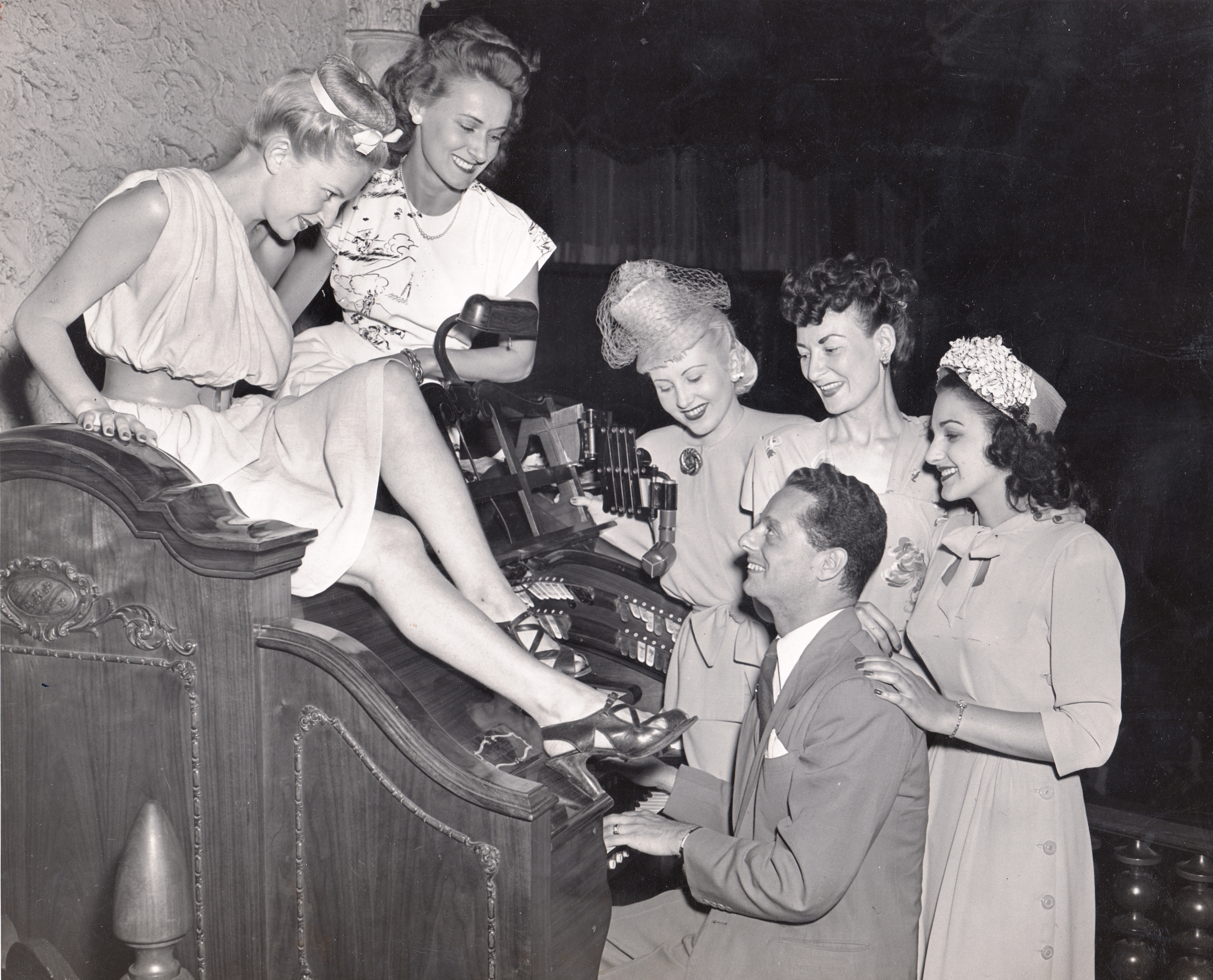
Hal at the Aragon Ballroom with Fans

Hal Pearl is probably best known for being the organist at the Aragon Ballroom for over 20 years. The Aragon hosted nearly all of the top names of the big band era. Hal was the resident organist during that era, playing with and during the intermissions of the sets of the visiting artists. Shows were radio broadcast nationally and even heard in Europe.

Hal Pearl was the organist for Chicago's tumultuous 1968 Democratic National Convention. He recalled being bused in with other members of the orchestra with heavy police protection. Hal was non-political and also played for Republican Vice President Spiro Agnew and President Richard Nixon. Other venues included downtown theaters such as The Oriental (now Nederlander) Theater, Chicago Theatre, and others such as The Willowbrook (O Henry) Ballroom. He played at Orchestra Hall, home of the Chicago Symphony Orchestra. Hal also played numerous conventions and shows such as the Chicago Flower Show at McCormick Place, events at the Chicago Coliseum, the Chicago International Amphitheatre, and others.

He was the first organist to introduce dancing to organ music.

Hal was the organist on the PBS television series The Toy That Grew Up which broadcast movies from the silent era. Producer Robert Seipp researched each film he presented with a pipe organ score provided by Hal; the on-screen host of the show was Don Ferris. The show was syndicated and broadcast on over 30 public television stations from 1962 to 1972.

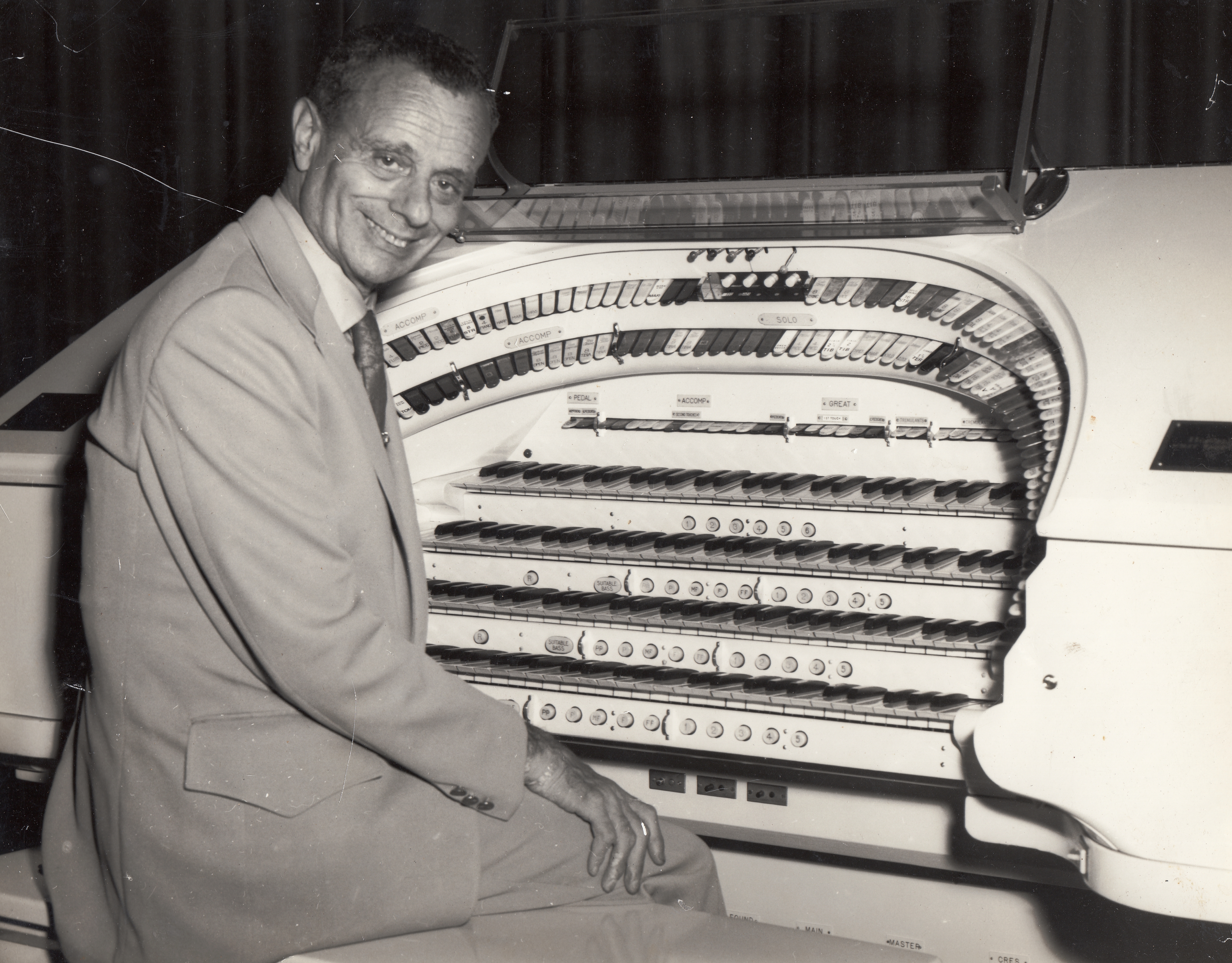
Hal Pearl at Chicago Theatre's "Mighty Wurlitzer"

Hal Pearl gave a sold-out organ concert at the reopening of the Chicago Theatre on Thursday evening, September 18, 1986. Hal's organ show re-introduced the Chicago Theatre's massive pipe organ to the public and followed a concert by Frank Sinatra on September 10. Hal was the headliner at the organ concert, the opening organist being a younger musician.

Gregory Pearl, a family member, overheard comments in the lobby at the concert where people said, "The kid can play the organ, but the old man (Hal) can make it sing."

Hal was the frequent headliner at organ shows at the Patio Theater in Chicago from the 1960s until shortly before his death.

== Educational activities ==
Hal Pearl taught organ for five years at the Metropolitan School of Music and served on the faculty of the Chicago Musical College. He worked as a high school music supervisor for the Chicago Board of Education. He taught students in the Chicago Public Schools as a guest instructor and substitute teacher for decades.

== Personal life ==
Hal never married or had children but cohabitated with his life partner, Louise Rainey until her death on July 29, 1994. Hal remarked that he never extensively toured as a musician because it required him to leave Louise and his dogs behind.

== Death ==
Hal Pearl died in Chicago on Thanksgiving Day, November 23, 2000, at the age of 92 (Variety) after a long battle with cancer. Despite being sick, he still put on an organ concert and accompanied the Rudolph Valentino silent movie Blood and Sand (1922) at Chicago's Patio Theater a year prior to his passing.
