= Tower of Jewels (Lakeside Amusement Park) =

Building at Lakeside Amusement Park

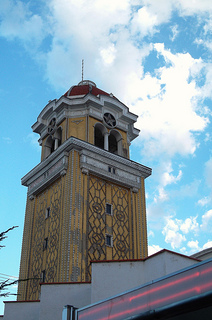
- Interactive map of the Tower of Jewels area

General information
- Location: Lakeside, Colorado, United States
- Coordinates: 39°46′50″N 105°03′13″W
- Construction started: September 24, 1907
- Client: Lakeside Realty & Amusement Company

Design and construction
- Architect: Edwin H. Moorman

The Tower of Jewels is the centerpiece of Lakeside Amusement Park in Lakeside, Colorado, United States. One of the tallest buildings in Colorado when it was built, it stands at 150 feet tall and features over 5,000 lights.

The tower was designed by prominent Denver architect Edwin H. Moorman. Ground was broken on September 24, 1907. The tower and the adjoining casino building were among the park's 15 original buildings, which were built by the Lakeside Realty & Amusement Company (commonly known as the Brewers Syndicate), headed by prominent Denver brewer Adolph Zang, as well as Godfrey Schirmer, Peter J. Friederich, John A. Keefe, and Albert Lewin.

The tower served as the main entrance to the park. It was originally topped by a kilocandela spotlight, which had previously been used on the Ferris wheel at the 1904 St. Louis World's Fair. The tower was largely empty, but featured an observation deck and a floor that served as a foyer for the upper level of the adjoining casino theater building. This level of the casino building originally housed a small theater. An expanded 1,700-seat theater was installed in the upper level for the 1910 season, and was removed around 1918.

A hailstorm in May 2017 did extensive damage to the tower and its lighting. Today, the tower and the casino building are closed to the public; the latter houses park offices and storage space.
