= Electric Park (disambiguation) =

Electric Park may refer to:

- Any of several Electric Park amusement parks that existed in the early Twentieth Century
- Electric Park, fictional town in motion picture Dear Wendy
- Electric Park, neighborhood in Lincoln Park, Michigan
- Electric Park, original name of Italian amusement ride manufacturer IE Park
- Electric Park Brake, subsidiary of TRW Automotive

== See also ==
- Tucson Electric Park
- Wind farm, sometimes called "wind electric park" or "wind park"
