= Bilhorod (disambiguation) =

Bilhorod is a Ukrainian name meaning "White City". It may refer to:

- Bilhorod-Dnistrovskyi, a city in Odesa Oblast, Ukraine
  - Bilhorod-Dnistrovskyi Raion, a subdivision of Odesa Oblast, Ukraine
  - Bilhorod-Dnistrovsky Seaport
  - Bilhorod-Dnistrovskyi fortress
- Bilhorod Kyivskyi, a defunct city of Kievan Rus', now in Kyiv Oblast, Ukraine

== See also ==
- Belgorod (disambiguation)
- Belgrade
- White City
