= Lake Rhoda =

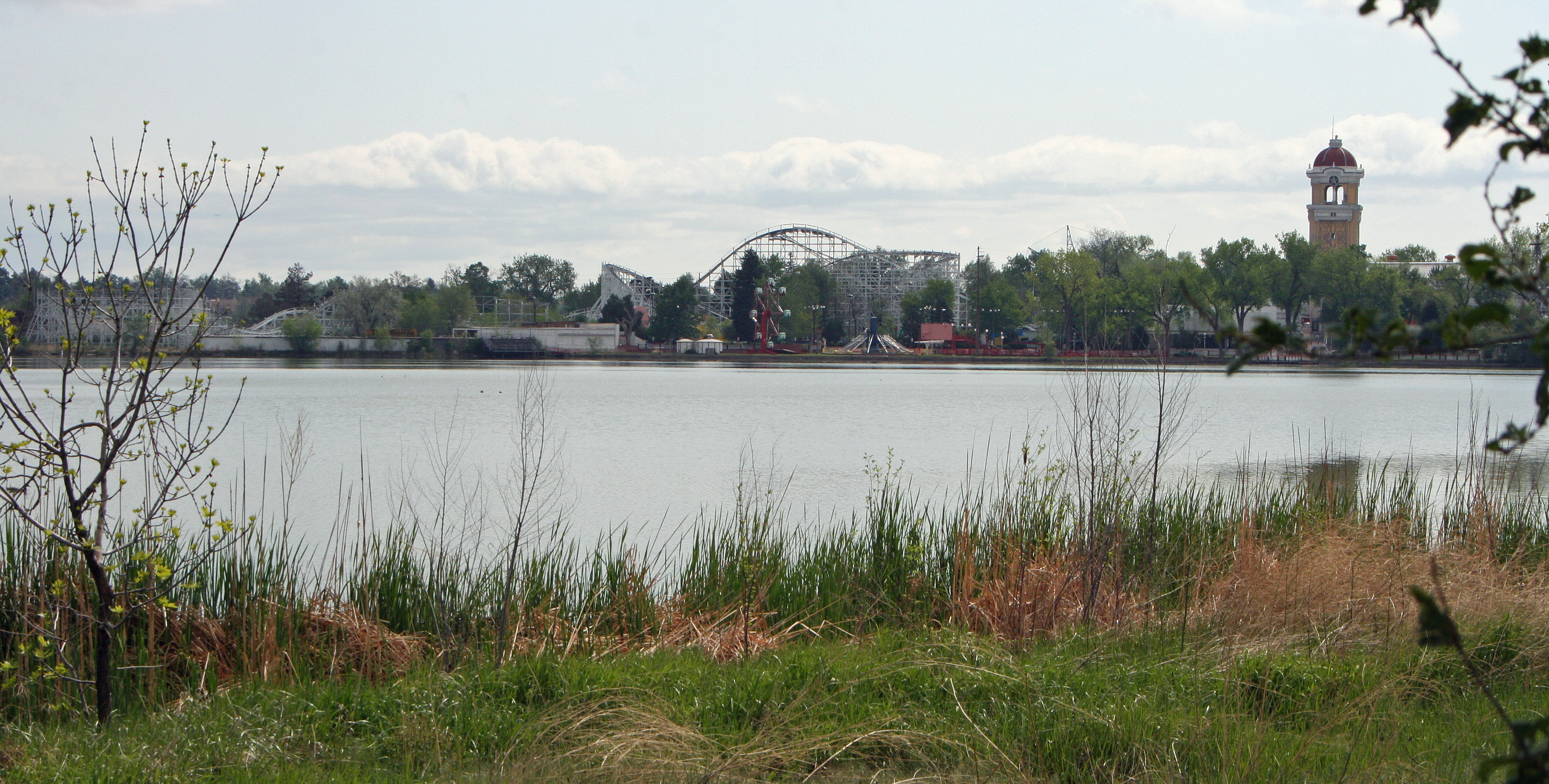

- Location within Colorado Location within the United States
- Location: Lakeside, Jefferson County, Colorado
- Coordinates: 39°46′51″N 105°03′30″W
- Type: Natural freshwater lake
- Basin countries: United States
- Max. length: 2,070 ft (630 m)
- Max. width: 1,215 ft (370 m)
- Surface elevation: 5,344 ft (1,629 m)
- Settlements: Lakeside, Colorado

Lake Rhoda is a natural lake in the town of Lakeside, Colorado, located between Interstate 70 and West 44th Avenue. Originally named West Berkeley Lake, it was renamed for Rhoda Krasner by her father, Ben Krasner, who rescued Lakeside Amusement Park from bankruptcy during the Great Depression.
