= White City (amusement parks) =

Early 20th-century amusement park model

White City is the common name of dozens of amusement parks in the United States, the United Kingdom, and Australia. Inspired by the White City and Midway Plaisance sections of the World's Columbian Exhibition of 1893, the parks started gaining in popularity in the last few years of the 19th century. After the 1901 Pan-American Exposition inspired the first Luna Park in Coney Island, a frenzy in building amusement parks (including those to be named White City, Luna Park, and Electric Park) ensued in the first two decades of the 20th century.

Like their Luna Park and Electric Park cousins, a typical White City park featured a shoot-the-chutes and lagoon, a roller coaster (usually a figure eight or a mountain railway), a midway, a Ferris wheel, games, and a pavilion. Some White City parks featured miniature railroads. Many cities had two (or all three) of the Electric Park/Luna Park/White City triumvirate in their vicinity... with each trying to outdo the others with new attractions. The competition was fierce, often driving the electric parks out of business due to increased cost due to equipment upgrades and upkeep and increasing insurance costs. More than a few succumbed to fire. Only one park that was given the White City name continues to operate today: Lakeside Amusement Park, opened in 1908, was originally advertised and known as Denver's White City.

== Origin ==
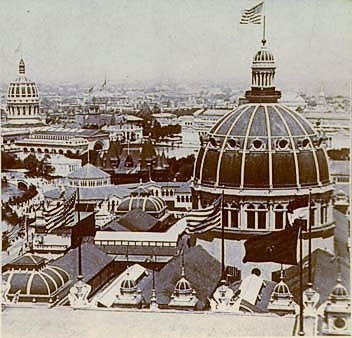
White City of the World's Columbian Exposition (1893)

The successful 1893 World's Columbian Exposition in Chicago attracted 26 million visitors and featured a section that is now commonly considered the first amusement park: a midway (the mile-long Midway Plaisance), the world's first Ferris wheel (constructed by George Washington Gale Ferris Jr.), a forerunner of the modern roller coaster (Thomas Rankin's Snow and Ice Railway, later moved to Coney Island), lighting and attractions powered by alternating current (Sebastian Ziani de Ferranti had completed the first power plant with AC power in London just the year before), and the debut of several kinds of foods in the United States, including hamburgers, shredded wheat, Cracker Jack, Juicy Fruit chewing gum, and pancakes made using Aunt Jemima pancake mix. The Zoopraxographical Hall was the first commercial theater. Ragtime composed and performed by Scott Joplin exposed millions of people to a new form of music and instantly became a staple for fairs and carnivals.

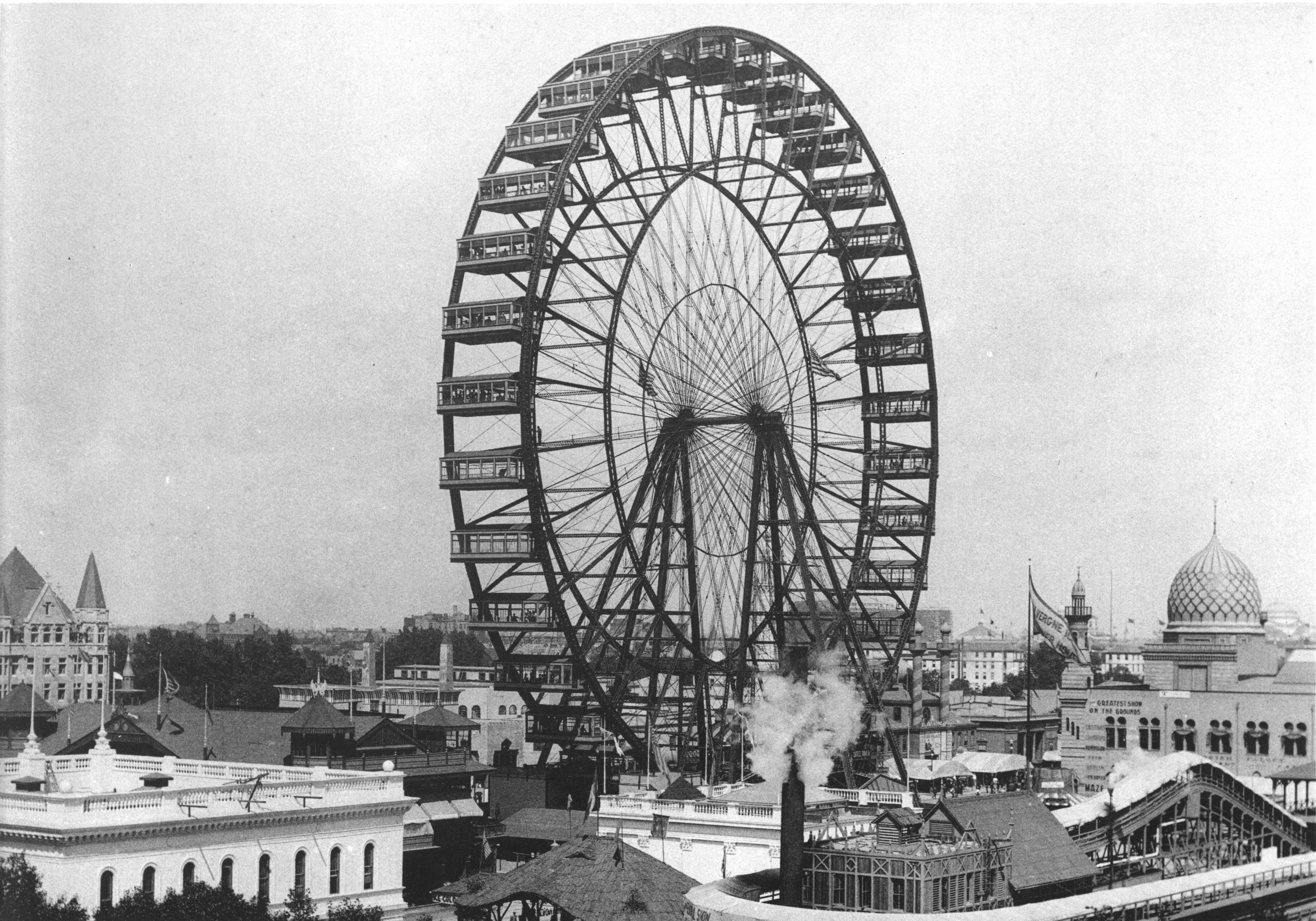
Ferris wheel at the World's Columbian Exposition. White City can be seen behind it and to the right.

While the Midway Plaisance became the Exposition's main drawing card, it was not the primary purpose of the World's Fair in the eyes of its founders, who pictured it to be the beginning of a classical renaissance featuring electrically-lit white stucco buildings (collectively known as White City) occupying the main court. While White City gave the park its visual identity, the throngs who attended the Columbian Exposition tended to collect at the Midway Plaisance (and Buffalo Bill's Wild West Show, which set up shop just outside the park grounds after the fair's founders rejected Buffalo Bill Cody's attempt to become an official Columbian Exhibition exhibitor). The World's Fair was destined to be remembered primarily for two ironic visions, that of the crowds at the Midway Plaisance (which essentially was the first modern amusement park with its entertainment, including exhibitions of boxer John L. Sullivan and exotic dancer Little Egypt, its games and its rides) and the architecture of the (far less popular) White City. Much of the Midway Plaisance reappeared in Coney Island's Steeplechase Park by the end of 1897 (but not the Ferris wheel, which had been committed to the 1904 World's Fair in St. Louis: a smaller version was built and installed in Paul Boyton's Steeplechase Park instead... along with a sign that stated "On this site will be erected the world's largest Ferris Wheel").

While Steeplechase Park eventually became one of the earliest embodiments of an amusement park, Chicago had one to replace Midway Plaisance a year after the close of the Columbian Exposition, Paul Boyton's Water Chutes, featuring a shoot-the-chutes ride that wasn't present in the Columbian Exposition, but would soon become a staple of amusement parks to come. Paul Boyton's Water Chutes was the first amusement to charge admission when it opened in 1894; inspired by the immediate success of his Chicago park (500,000 people visiting it in its first year of operation), he moved (and expanded) Water Chutes in 1896, a year after he started the similar Sea Lion Park in Coney Island.

Foretelling a fate similar to most amusement parks that followed, Paul Boyton's Water Chutes went out of business in 1908, in the face of increasing competition, mainly exhibition parks inspired by the Columbian Exposition in Chicago ("White City") and the 1901 Pan-American Exposition in Buffalo ("Luna Park") and the emergence of trolley parks owned and operated by railroads and electric companies ("Electric Park"). In 1901, Boyton sold Sea Lion Park to Frederic Thompson and Elmer "Skip" Dundy, who operated "A Trip to the Moon" in both Buffalo and Steeplechase Park. Thompson and Dundy quickly redesigned Sea Lion Park and redubbed it Luna Park, which quickly added to the legend of Coney Island.

== White City parks and the amusement park boom ==
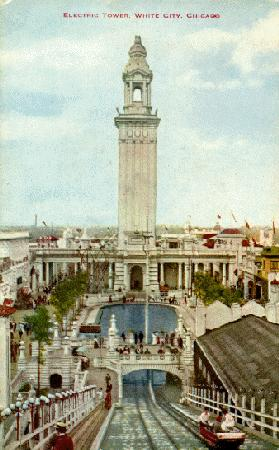
Postcard view of Chicago's White City amusement park. The 300-foot-tall Electric Tower was one of the highlights of "the city of a million electric lights" that could be seen from 15 miles away.

In the half decade after the end of the Columbian Exposition, the American concept of the amusement park was starting to take hold, with the increased popularity of shoot-the-chutes rides, roller coasters (with roller coaster designer and entrepreneur Frederick Ingersoll providing many parks - many of long standing - with figure 8 roller coasters and scenic railways long before starting his Luna Park chain in 1905) were being erected in a frenetic pace (over a quarter century period, the Ingersoll Construction Company, erected more than eleven roller coasters per year). Railway companies, noticing the popularity of Midway Plaisance of the Columbian Exposition and the lack of railroad ridership on the weekends, constructed trolley parks as an effort to improve their bottom line. Power companies were starting to partner with railroad companies to create electric trolley companies... and construct Electric Parks.

As the end of the 19th century approached, a few exhibition parks - those inspired by the exhibits and midways of either the Columbian Exposition or the (later) Pan-American Exposition - started to appear. Before the end of the year 1900, White City amusement parks were making their appearance in Philadelphia (1898 - it was also known as Chestnut Hill Park) and Cleveland (1900). Soon, some long-established parks changed their names to White City upon the addition of amusement rides and a midway (Seattle, for example). As the American amusement park was increasing in popularity in the first few years of the 1900s, the success of the 1901 Pan-American Exposition (particularly its "Trip to the Moon" ride, featuring "Luna Park") led to the first Luna Park in Coney Island in 1903... and an explosion of nearly identical amusement parks soon followed. There were roughly 250 amusements operating in the United States in 1899; the number almost tripled (700) by 1905; and more than doubled again (to 1500) by 1919 - and these latter figures do not include the amusement parks that were opened and permanently closed by then.

While the White City in Chicago was not the first one of that name, it was certainly one of the most fondly remembered. Within years of its 1905 founding, dozens of White City parks dotted the United States (with Australia and the United Kingdom having namesakes built by the 1910s). Although most White City parks were out of business by the end of the United States involvement in World War I, a few survived into the middle third of the 20th century. The Chicago White City lasted until 1946; the Worcester park survived until 1960. Of the White City amusement parks, only one survives, the last exhibition park still standing: Lakeside Amusement Park. Built and opened in 1908 just outside the Denver, Colorado city limits, Lakeside Park was advertised as "Denver's White City" and "The Coney Island of the West" from its inception throughout the 1910s. Although the official use of the White City moniker was largely discontinued by the 1920s, members of the local populace continued to refer to the park as "White City," and a number of the park's 1908 structures and attractions remain.

== List of White City amusement parks ==
The following is a list of amusement parks that have had the name White City in the United States, Canada, Australia, and the United Kingdom.

=== United States ===
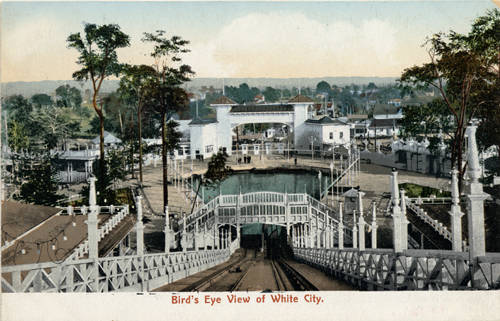
Postcard view of Cleveland's White City amusement park, one of several amusement parks operating in the Ohio city in the first decade of the Twentieth Century.

- White City (Atlanta), Georgia
- White City (Bellingham), Washington (1906–1912)
- White City (Binghamton), New York (1902–1910), also called Wagner's Park
- White City (Boise), Idaho
- White City (Chicago), Illinois (1905–1946)
- White City (Cleveland), Ohio (1900–1908), reopened 1909 as Cleveland Beach Park
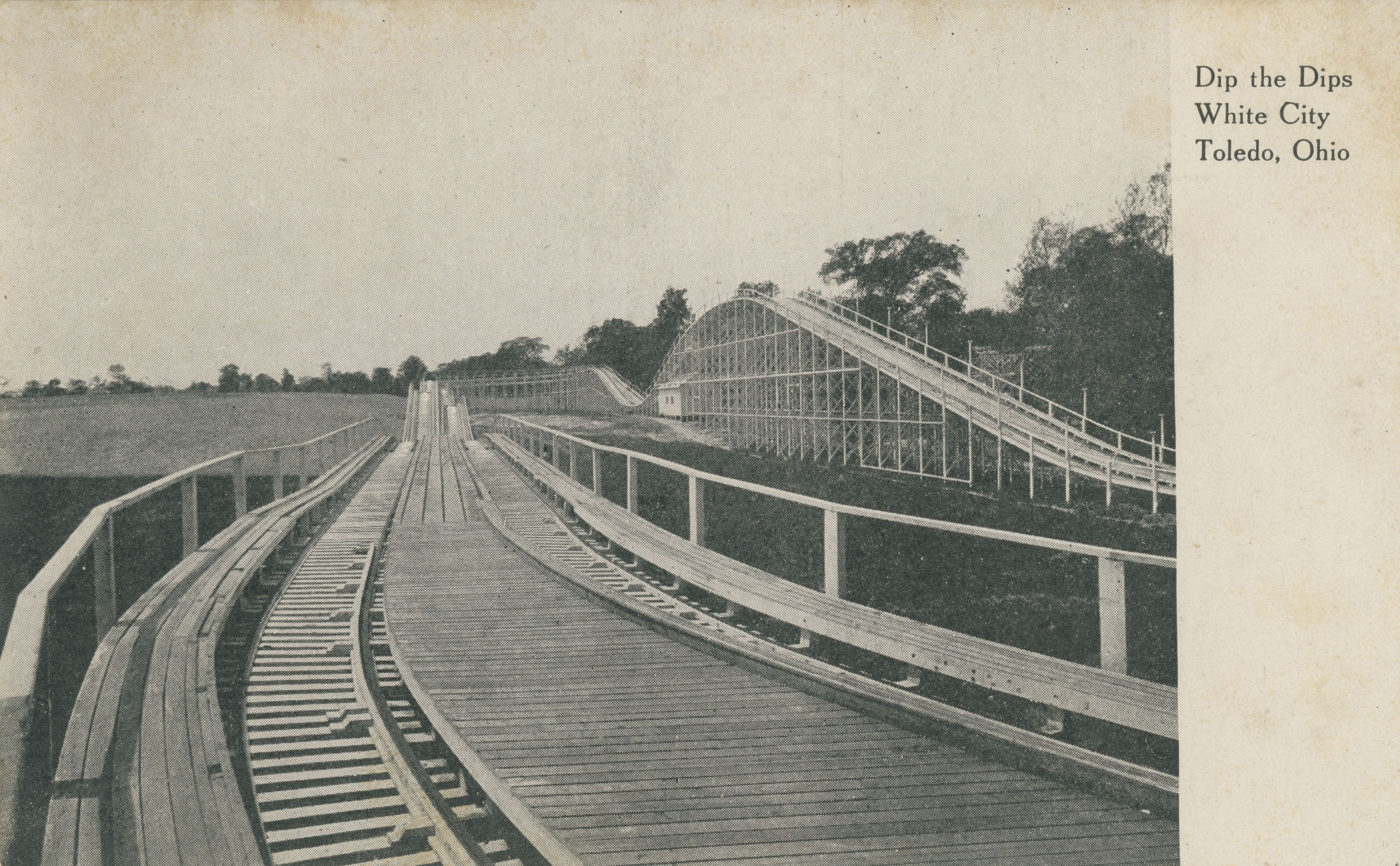
- Dip the dips, White City, Toledo, Ohio, 1910s
  White City (Dayton), Ohio (1907–1910); grounds flooded in 1913, then became Island MetroPark in 1914
- White City (Denver), Colorado (1908–present) also known as Lakeside Amusement Park
- White City (Des Moines), Iowa
- White City (Duluth), Minnesota
- White City (Excelsior Springs), Missouri
- White City (Fort Worth), Texas - official name: Rosen Heights Amusement Park. Opened 1905; last structure standing (pavilion) destroyed by fire, 17 June 1933
- White City (Houghton), Michigan
- White City (Indianapolis), Indiana (26 May 1906-26 June 1908) at Broad Ripple Park
- White City (Louisville), Kentucky (1907–1912)
- White City (Milwaukee), Wisconsin
- White City (New Orleans), Louisiana (1907–1913)
- White City (Oswego), New York (1906–1918)
- White City (Peoria), Illinois (1943-?)
- White City (Philadelphia), Pennsylvania (1898–1911), also known as Chestnut Hill Park
- White City (Seattle), Washington (1888–1911)
- White City (Springfield, Missouri) (1907–1912)
- White City (Syracuse), New York (1906–1915)
- White City (Toledo), Ohio (1905-1915) This park was purchased by the city of Toledo in 1915, and became what is now Jermain Park.
- White City (Trenton), New Jersey (1907–1920) - also known as Capital Park, White City was built in Spring Lake Park (opened in 1895 with picnic area and merry-go-round)
- White City (West Haven), Connecticut (1903-?), also known as White City, Savin Rock
- White City (Shrewsbury, Massachusetts), Massachusetts (1905–1960)

=== Britain, Canada, and Australia ===
- White City (London), United Kingdom (1908–1914), in Shepherd's Bush, park opened to host the 1908 Olympic Games
- White City, Greater Manchester, United Kingdom (1907–1928) - originally open 1827 as a botanical garden; became amusement park 1907 (closed in 1928); track and stadium built 1930, closed 1982 (demolished in 1980s) Now a shopping center.
- White City (Sydney), New South Wales (1913–1917), became site of White City Tennis Club (stadium opened 1922, demolished 2022)
- White City (Perth), Western Australia (circa 1914 - 1929)
- White City (Vancouver), British Columbia

== See also ==
- World's Columbian Exposition - White City exhibit that inspired its use as an amusement park name
- White City - lists many uses of the name, mainly not related to amusement parks
