= The Toy That Grew Up =

American television series

The Toy That Grew Up is an American television series produced by WTTW, the Chicago affiliate of the National Educational Television (NET) network that showed complete and uninterrupted silent films. It was an introduction to silent films for many Americans. It lasted from 1962 to 1972.

The theme music used for the program is The Curse of an Aching Heart.

== History ==
Beginning in August 1960 a keen cinephile named Robert C. Seipp (1930–2008) acquired the rights to show over a hundred mostly American made silent films; 90% came from private collections.

Seipp researched each film he presented with a pipe organ score provided by former cinema organist Hal Pearl (1908–2000); the on screen host of the show was Don Ferris. As opposed to the usual American television of the timeshowing silent films that provided narration over clips from various films such as The Funny Manns or Hollywood and the Stars, or series that ridiculed the films through comedy dubbing such as Fractured Flickers, The Toy That Grew Up showed complete original silent films with the original intertitle cards.

The series premiered in August 1962 and was eventually syndicated and shown on over 30 NET and later, Public Broadcasting Service television stations.
