= Electric Park, Baltimore =

Amusement park in Baltimore, Maryland, US 1896–1915

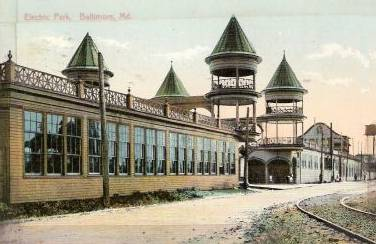
Postcard view of Electric Park, Baltimore's main entrance, c. 1907. The entrance also served as a stop for the local trolley (as evidenced by the tracks in the lower right corner). The park buildings were razed in 1916.

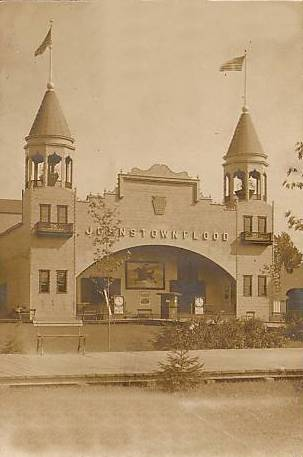
Postcard view of Electric Park, Baltimore's Johnstown Flood exhibit. Many Electric Parks, White City amusement parks, and Luna Parks installed state-of-the-art (for the time period) simulations of the 1889 disaster.

Electric Park was a 24-acre (97,000 m^{2}) amusement park in Baltimore, Maryland, located near the intersection of Belvedere Avenue and Reisterstown Road. A trolley park that originally opened as a racetrack for harness racing, It opened in 1896, closed in 1915 and was razed in 1916. Electric Park's primary attractions were the thousands of light bulbs that shone at night. Admission to the park was free. The park was served by the North Avenue line of the United Railways & Electric Company for the duration of the park's existence.

On 16 July 1896, the park was the first place in the State of Maryland to show motion pictures to the public; the ensuing series of presentations at the park helped establish Electric Park's popularity. Two years later (22 November 1900), the Electric Park racetrack was the site of Maryland's first automobile race.

By 1900, a carousel was added to the park and was an immediate success. Subsequent additions include a casino restaurant, a simulation of the Johnstown Flood, a shoot-the-chutes ride, a "Human Laundry" ride, a "Human Roulette Wheel" ride, two roller coasters, boating attractions, vaudeville acts, and band concerts.

In addition to regular fireworks displays presented by a man billing himself as "Professor Pain", the park featured live performances, including Pawnee Bill's Wild West Show (which at one time had a lion escape from its handler's control), and performances by a band led by Signor Vincent Del Manto (with the playing of "Electric Park March" on special occasions). In June 1908, a dirigible flown by Lincoln Beachy was launched from the park as a publicity stunt (the airship landed atop a building in downtown Baltimore).

While Electric Park enjoyed great popularity in the first dozen years of the 20th century, increased competition in addition to increasing insurance and maintenance costs forced its closure at the end of the 1915 season. The park was razed the following year. No trace of the Electric Park remains.
