= Electric Park =

Amusement park genre

Electric Park is a genre of defunct amusement parks operating from the 1880s to the 1920s, to showcase the electrification of, and the advent of electricity as a utility in, the United States. Many were constructed as trolley parks and owned by electric companies and streetcar companies. After 1903, the success of Coney Island inspired a proliferation of parks named Luna Park and Electric Park, and the World's Columbian Exposition of 1893 inspired the formation of White City amusement parks at about the same time. The existence of most of these parks was generally brief, roughly 15 years on average, and the bulk of them closed by 1917, when the United States entered World War I. Many of the parks' pavilions have outlasted the parks.

== Overview ==
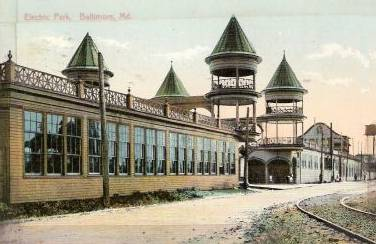
This postcard shows Electric Park, Baltimore's main entrance, c. 1907, which was also a trolley stop, as evidenced by the tracks in the lower right corner. The buildings were razed in 1916.

The emergence of trolley parks in the 1890s coincided with the rise to prominence of three entities: the electric utility companies (which grew rapidly as much of the United States was undergoing electrification since the 1880s), the railway companies (which constructed new interurban rail lines mainly in the eastern half of the U. S.), and – starting about 1890 – the replacement of horse-drawn cars by electric trolley companies. A fourth contributor to the rise in amusement parks in the first decade of the 20th century was the success of Coney Island, which spurred the establishment of dozens of Electric Parks, Luna Parks, and White City amusement parks (the latter actually inspired by White City in the 1893 World's Columbian Exhibition in Chicago), with many metropolitan areas having at least two parks with these names.

Most Electric Parks were owned by electric companies and trolley companies, many of which transported workers and shoppers between downtowns to residential and industrial areas. After 1900, interurban electric rail lines began carrying commuters from one city to another. Originally, the trolleys and interurban lines either operated at a reduced level on weekends or were completely idle. To generate weekend traffic, the companies eventually created new destinations, generally at the end of their lines, for the public to attend on the weekends, at picnic parks, or later at amusement parks. Regardless of the type of park, the destinations owned by the local electric company or accessed by the electric trolley were commonly called electric parks. After 1903, Luna Park in Coney Island's success (with the park's entrance decked with electric lights) inspired the creation of Electric Parks, which spread throughout North America. At the same time, the similarly-inspired Frederick Ingersoll started to construct his Luna Park empire.

Like their Luna Park and White City cousins, a typical Electric Park featured a shoot the chute and lagoon, a roller coaster (usually a figure eight or a mountain railway), a midway, a Ferris wheel, games, and a pavilion. Most also had miniature railroads. Many cities had two, or all three, of the triumvirate of Electric Park, Luna Park, and White City in their vicinity, with each trying to outdo the others with new attractions, and exhibiting a simulation of the Johnstown Flood of 1889. The competition was fierce, often driving the electric parks out of business with increasing costs of equipment upgrades, upkeep, and insurance. Some succumbed to fire. As a result, most were out of business by 1917, the year the United States entered World War I. By the time troops returned to the U.S. in 1919, almost all the Electric Parks were gone.

== List of Electric Parks ==
The identity of the first Electric Park is unknown, and the total number is unknown, but many opened in the late 1800s.

- Electric Park, Aberdeen, Washington
- Electric Park, Atlanta, Georgia
- Electric Park, Baltimore, Maryland (June 1896 – 1916)
- Electric Park, Funkstown, Maryland (1897 – 1927)
- Electric Park, Bellingham, Washington

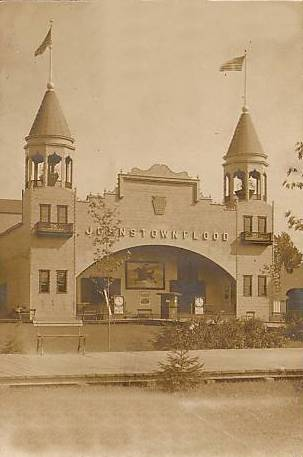
This postcard shows Electric Park, Baltimore's Johnstown Flood exhibit. Many Electric Parks, White City amusement parks, and Luna Parks installed state-of-the-art simulations of the 1889 disaster.

- Electric Park, Binghamton, New York
- Electric Park, Blackwell, Oklahoma – pavilion still stands, listed on the National Register of Historic Places
- Electric Park, Cleveland, Ohio
- Electric Park, Dayton, Ohio
- Electric Park, Detroit, Michigan (May 26, 1906 – 1928), went through several names in its existence, including Luna Park
- Electric Park, Eau Claire, Wisconsin (1895 – c. 1926) – park adjacent to nearby Lake Hallie; closed after Chippewa Valley Electric Railway ceased operations on September 1, 1926
- Electric Park, Fort Smith, Arkansas (1905–1920)
- Electric Park, Galveston, Texas (1905–?)
- Electric Park, Hancock, Michigan (June 7, 1906 – c. 1933) – originally Anwebida ("Let us rest here" in Chippewa)
- Electric Park, Holland, Michigan, also known as Jenison Electric Park
- Electric Park, Houston, Texas
- Electric Park, Iola, Kansas (c. 1901–1918), also known as "Iola Electric Park"
- Electric Park, Joplin, Missouri (June 10, 1909 – 1912) – now part of Schifferdecker Park
- Electric Park, Kansas City, Missouri (1907–1925) – this second Electric Park by the Heim Brothers, who had opened their first Electric Park in 1899 adjacent to their brewery in the East Bottoms, influenced the budding Kansas City animator Walt Disney's concept for Disneyland
- Electric Park, Louisville, Kentucky,
- Electric Park, Montgomery, Alabama
- Electric Park, New Haven, Connecticut
- Electric Park, Newark, New Jersey (1903–1912) park that is now the site of Vailsburg Park
- Electric Park, Niagara Falls, New York
- Electric Park, Niverville, New York, New York(1901–1917), also known as White City
- Electric Park, Oshkosh, Wisconsin (1898 – c. 1950), also called White City and EWECO Park
- Electric Park, Pensacola, Florida (1905–?)
- Electric Park, Pittsburgh, Pennsylvania
- Electric Park, Plainfield, Illinois (1904–1932); auditorium became a dance hall and then a skating rink (both roller and ice) until destroyed by tornado in 1990
- Electric Park, Pottsville, Pennsylvania – also called Electric Park Philadelphia
- Electric Park, St. Louis, Missouri in Creve Coeur Park
- Electric Park, San Antonio, Texas - currently the site of Nelson Wolff Stadium
- Electric Park, Sheboygan, Wisconsin
- Electric Park, Springfield, Missouri – may be same as Joplin Electric Park
- Electric Park, Syracuse, New York
- Electric Park, Tulsa, Oklahoma (1921 – c. 1926)- merged into Crystal City Amusement Park in mid 1920s
- Electric Park, Waterloo, Iowa – had unique water-turned ferris wheel; pavilion still standing
- Electric Park, Worcester, Massachusetts

== See also ==
- Tucson Electric Park, baseball stadium in Tucson, Arizona
