= Lakeside Amusement Park =

Amusement park in Lakeside, Colorado

- Previously known as White City

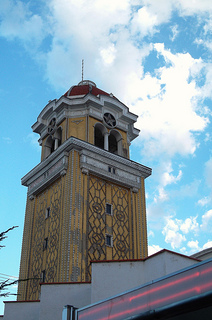
- The park's Tower of Jewels in 2012
- Interactive map of Lakeside Amusement Park
- Location: Lakeside, Colorado, United States
- Coordinates: 39°46′42″N 105°03′34″W
- Opened: May 30, 1908
- Owner: Lakeside Park Company
- Slogan: "Enjoy the ride!"
- Operating season: First weekend in May to Labor Day

Attractions
- Total: 36
- Roller coasters: 5
- Water rides: 1
- Website: lakesideamusementpark.com

Lakeside Amusement Park is a family-owned amusement park in Lakeside, Colorado. Opened in 1908, it is the oldest amusement park in Colorado still operating in its original location, (Note: Elitch Gardens has been in operation since 1890, but moved from its original location in 1994.) and is the last remaining White City-style park in the United States. The park notably features the Tower of Jewels and the Cyclone roller coaster.

== History ==
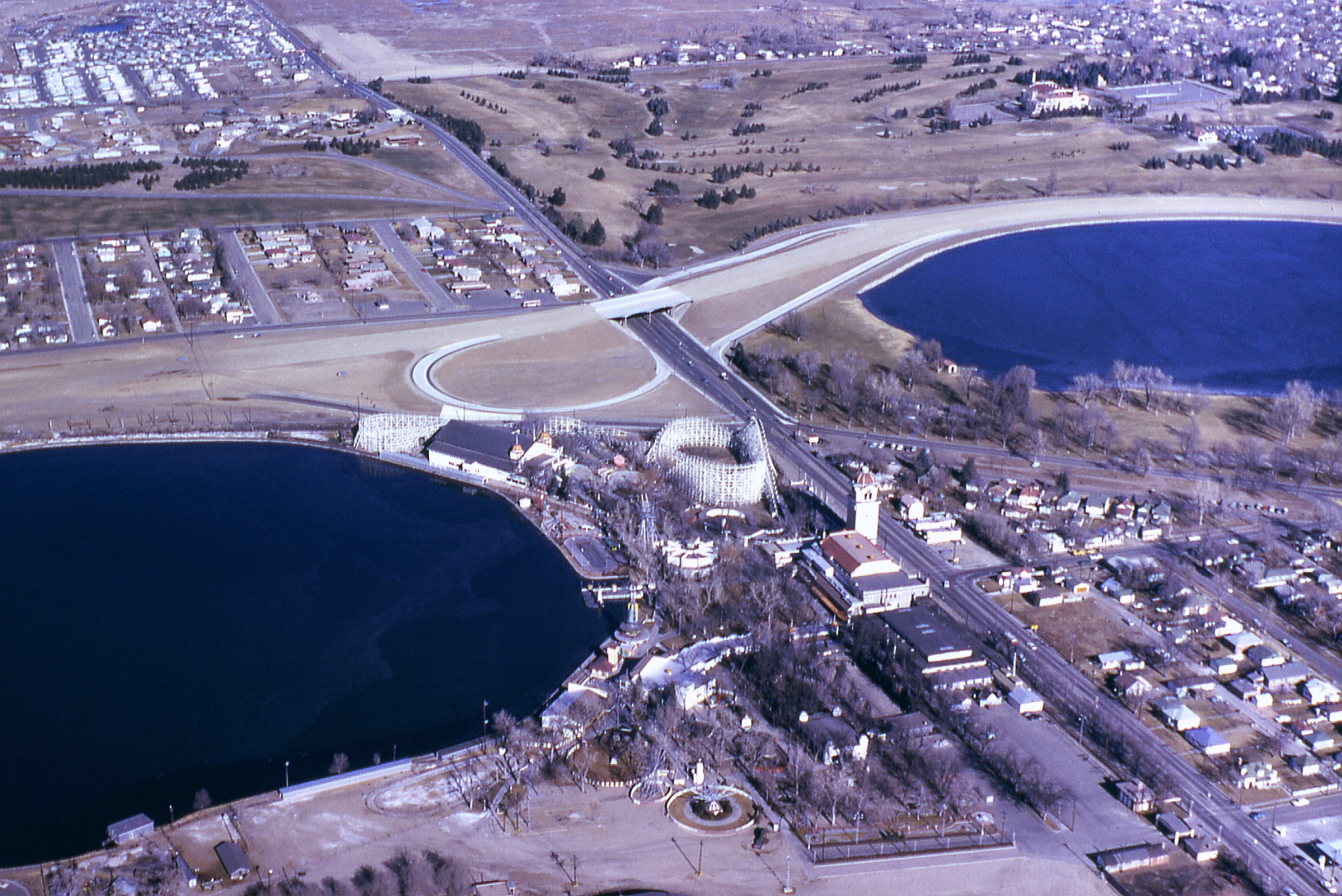
Aerial view of Lakeside Amusement Park in 1966

Panoramic view of the park in 1908

Lakeside Amusement Park, originally known as White City, was founded by a group led by Denver-based brewer Adolph Zang, on an approximately 57-acre site adjacent to Lake Rhoda (then known as West Berkeley Lake). Referred to as "the Coney Island of the West", the park featured the Beaux-Arts and Neoclassical architectural styles favored in many other amusement parks of the era, and was lit by an estimated 100,000 electric bulbs. It was serviced by a trolley line built by the Denver Tramway, but was independently owned, rather than being owned by the trolley company that served the park, meaning it is not a true trolley park.

The park’s original buildings included the 150-foot Tower of Jewels at the park’s main entrance, a natatorium, a 15,000 square foot ballroom, a roller skating rink, a boat house with a 160-foot pier, and a miniature train station modeled after Denver Union Station.

Original rides and attractions included the Lakeshore Railroad (a miniature railroad which circled the lake), a merry-go-round, a Ferris wheel, an airship and balloon ascension platform, a funhouse, the Devil's Palace (described as an "interesting and instructing amusement" featuring snakes and other reptiles), a shoot the chutes, a mile-long Scenic Railway, and the Velvet Coaster. W.H. Labb of Indianapolis designed the Velvet Coaster, which featured a 1,200 foot (370 m) framework situated along the southern end of the lake, with a total of 3,600 feet (1,100 m) of track. A ride called Tickler was installed, but was removed soon after customers reported it causing serious injuries, including broken bones.

Derby Racer, a double-track racing coaster designed by John A. Miller, was added in 1911. The ride was built at the northern end of the park, which had previously been used for social functions only, signifying a gradual move away from the park's White City aspirations into a more amusement ride-centric focus.

Scenic Railway and several other structures in the southwestern section of the park were destroyed by a fire on November 15, 1911. Another fire in January 1912 destroyed the skating rink and damaged Derby Racer. Derby Racer was repaired, while the natatorium was converted into a new roller skating rink. It would not be used for swimming again until 1928.

Following its acquisition by Ben Krasner in 1935, the park underwent a period of major renovations and additions. Many new rides were added, including the Cyclone roller coaster, which replaced Derby Racer in 1940. New buildings and features were built in the Art Deco style, including individual ticket booths for most major rides and attractions. Architect Richard L. Crowther designed much of the park's architectural features during this period, and included a great deal of neon lighting in his work.

In June 1973, an investigation by a Jefferson County Grand Jury found that "all structures on the...grounds would justify charges as dangerous buildings as described in the Uniform Building Code". Three inspections were conducted through 1972 and 1973, with one on May 21, 1973 finding 70 specific violations of building, electrical, and fire codes. Some of the violations included antiquated wiring, non-fire resistant paneling, lack of exit lighting, missing portable fire extinguishers, and inward-opening exit doors. The report also noted that "general sanitary conditions in food preparation and customer service areas...w[as] unbelievable. Grease accumulation and scum were heavy on cooking appliances, all adjacent areas and particularly on the floor and counters". Following the investigation, the park made changes based on the grand jury report findings to improve safety to avoid being forced to close its doors.

The ballroom closed in 1972 due to declining interest in ballroom dancing. It was later deemed a significant fire hazard and was demolished in 1974. A fire in December 1973 destroyed the pool building, which was at the time being used for maintenance and off-season storage. Parts and blueprints for many of the park's rides were lost.

From 1938 through 1988, Lakeside Amusement Park operated Lakeside Speedway on the park grounds. The auto racetrack was a 1/5-mile (0.32 km) oval and featured races of three car classes sponsored by CARC: stock, limited modified, and fully modified. The race track was built on the site of the park's former baseball diamond, and reused the spectator stands from the baseball field in the track's viewing area. Following a fatal accident in 1988, racing at the park came to an end.

In 2014, members of the Domino Service Dogs training group were denied access to the train ride unless they left their service dogs behind. As a result, the Cross Disability Coalition filed a lawsuit against the park, alleging violations of the Americans with Disabilities Act and Colorado's laws ensuring access. The local police department and the town of Lakeside were also included as defendants in the suit.

The 1908 tower and casino building still stand, but are closed to the public, instead being used for storage and park offices. Also closed to the public is the Riviera cocktail lounge, the lone remnant of the park's original ballroom building.

== Rides ==
=== Roller coasters ===
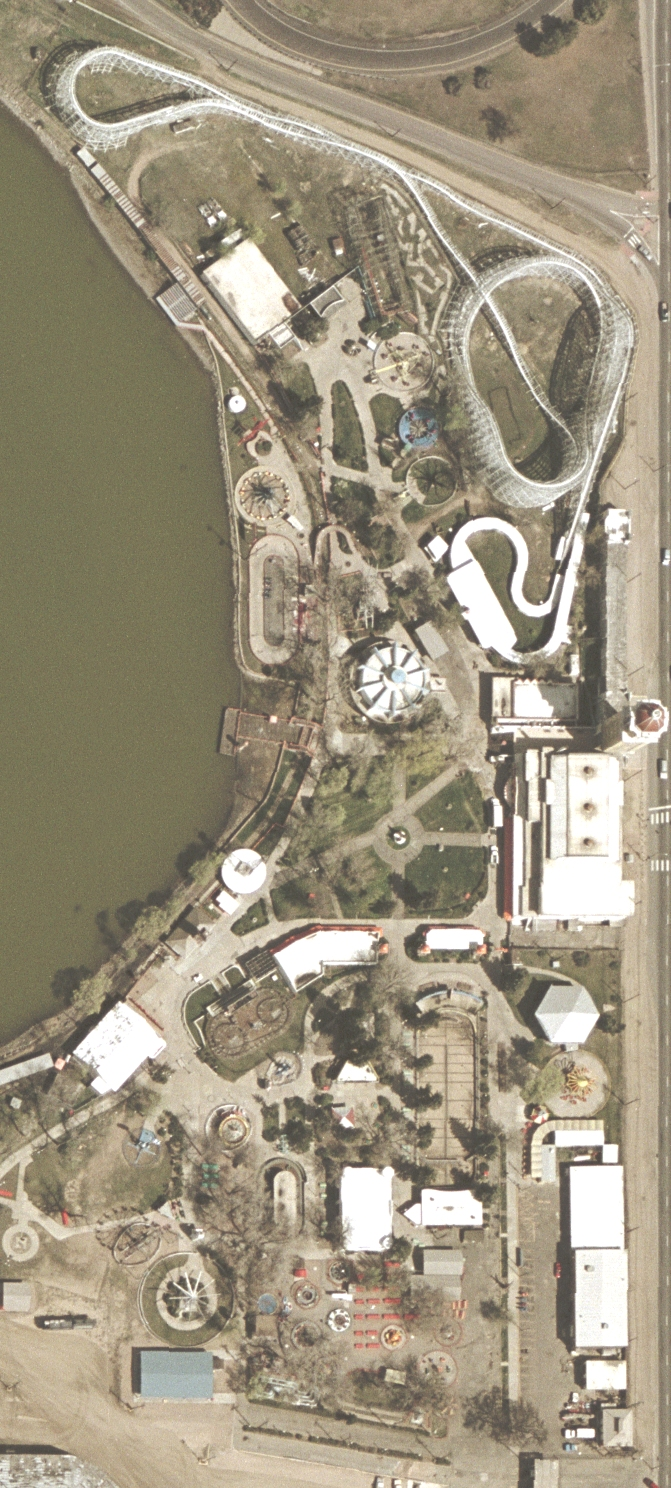
Satellite view of the park in 2004

Name	Year installed	Type	Manufacturer	Notes
Coaster	2018	Steel Galaxi roller coaster	Pinfari	Manufactured in 1973. Originally opened at Hamel's Park as Thunderail in 1978, then spent time at Celebration City as Zyklon (2000-2001), Saginaw County Fairgrounds as Zyklon (2003-2006), and Fun Plex as Big Ohhhh! (2007-2017), before finally being moved to Lakeside Amusement Park in 2018. The ride would stand out of operation until 2023.
Cyclone	1940	Wooden roller coaster	Edward A. Vettel	ACE Coaster Classic and Coaster Landmark. Has been standing out of operation since 2023.
Dragon	1986	Steel powered children's roller coaster	Zamperla	Has been standing out of operation since 2020
Kiddie Coaster	2001	Steel children's roller coaster	Miler Manufacturing	
Wild Chipmunk	1955	Steel wild mouse roller coaster	Miler Manufacturing	

=== Other amusement rides ===
Name	Type	Manufacturer	Notes
Auto Skooters	Bumper cars	Unknown	
Balloon Ferris Wheel	Ferris wheel	Unknown	
Crystal Palace	Funhouse	Unknown	
Heart Flip	Unknown	Unknown	
Loop-O-Plane	Loop-O-Plane	Eyerly Aircraft Company	
Matterhorn	Matterhorn	Unknown	
Merry-Go-Round	Carousel	C. W. Parker Company	Opened in 1908
Rock-O-Plane	Rock-O-Plane	Eyerly Aircraft Company	
Round-Up	Round Up	Unknown	
Satellite	Satellite Jets	Kasper Klaus	
Scrambler	Scrambler	Eli Bridge Company	
Skoota Boats	Bumper boats	Unknown	The lagoon in which the boats operate was previously home to the 1908 shoot the chutes ride
Spider	Spider	Eyerly Aircraft Company	Opened in 2018, replacing a previous model that closed in 2016
Sports Cars	Go-karts	Unknown	
Tilt-A-Whirl	Tilt-A-Whirl	Sellner Manufacturing	
Train	Train ride	Unknown	Opened in 1908. Features the steam train locomotives "Puffing Billy" and "Whistling Tom" from the 1904 St. Louis World's Fair, along with the world's first miniature gauge diesel locomotive, patterned after the California Zephyr. As of 2025, only the diesel locomotive is in service.
Whip	The Whip	Unknown	Originally installed in 1916 near the ballroom, but was removed in the 1920s. Installed in current location in 1941.
Zoom	Drop tower	Unknown	

=== Kiddie rides ===
- Captain Hook
- Dry Boats
- Flying Tigers
- Frog Hopper
- Granny Bug
- Horse & Buggy
- Jolly Choo-Choo
- Kiddie Whip
- Midge-o-Racers
- Mini Skater
- Motorcycles
- Sky Fighters
- Turtles

=== Former attractions ===
Name	Type	Manufactuer	Notes
Circle Swing	Spinning rocket ship swing ride	Unknown	Removed in 1982. The ride's base and tower still stand as part of a midway game.
Derby Racer	Wooden racing roller coaster	Frederick Ingersoll, John A. Miller	Operated from 1911 to 1937
Dip the Dips	Wooden roller coaster	Unknown	Operated from 1911 to 1918. May have contained reused parts from Velvet Coaster.
Double-Whirl	Unknown	Unknown	
Flight to Mars	Portable dark ride	Unknown	
Flying Dutchman	Unknown	Unknown	
Fun House	Funhouse	Unknown	Removed in 1985. Featured a Laffing Sal animatronic.
Hurricane	Unknown	Unknown	
Lindy Loop	Unknown	Unknown	
Octopus	Octopus	Eyerly Aircraft Company	Known to have operated in the 1930s
Paratrooper	Paratrooper	Unknown	
Roll-O-Plane	Roll-O-Plane	Eyerly Aircraft Company	
Scenic Railway	Wooden scenic railway roller coaster	William H. Labb, LaMarcus Adna Thompson	Operated from 1908 to 1911. Destroyed in a fire on November 14, 1911.
Shoot-the-Chutes	Shoot the chute	Unknown	
Sky Slide	Unknown	Unknown	
Speed Boats	Speed boats	Unknown	The pier the attraction utillized is still standing
Spider	Spider	Eyerly Aircraft Company	Removed in 2016 and replaced in 2018 with a ride of the same model
Staride	Ferris wheel	Unknown	Operated from 1916 to the 1970s. The remains of the ride are still standing.
Starship 2000	Unknown	Unknown	
The Tickler	Wooden spinning roller coaster (Virginia Reel)	Unknown	Operated from 1908 to 1910
Trip to the North Pole	Wooden Scenic Railway roller coaster	Unknown	Operated for the 1911 season only
Tumble Bug	Tumble Bug	Traver Engineering Company	Operated from the 1930s to 1985
Velvet Coaster	Wooden roller coaster	William H. Labb, John A. Miller	Operated from 1908 to 1910. Parts of it may have been reused to build Dip the Dips.

== Incidents ==
- In February 1908, a car on Scenic Railway left the track, causing injuries to fifteen people.
- In June 1908, a car on Scenic Railway left the track, causing injuries to seventeen people.
- In July 1908, a woman shot an ex-boyfriend in the cafe below the ballroom.
- In July 1912, a woman drowned in the lake.
- In August 1915, a man was killed after being thrown from Derby Racer.
- In July 1916, a couple drowned in the lake under unknown circumstances.
- In August 1919, a boy was killed after being struck by Train.
- In July 1923, a man was injured after falling from Derby Racer.
- In June 1934, two youths drowned in the lake after their boat overturned.
- In June 1944, an 18-year-old woman was killed and seven others were injured in an accident on Cyclone.
- In August 1950, a 7-year-old girl was shot through the leg by a bullet that pierced the protective shield of the shooting gallery.
- In 1954, a man was thrown from a car on the Cyclone and died from injuries.
- In September 1959, four people were injured when the emergency brake system failed on Wild Chipmunk.
- In June 1962, a man was killed when he struck an object while standing during a ride on Cyclone.
- In May 1972, four people were injured by a train collision on Cyclone.
- In September 1988, a woman was killed and twelve others were injured when a race car flipped into the viewing stands at the Lakeside Speedway Track.
- In September 1994, 24 people were injured when two trains on Cyclone collided in the loading area.

== In popular culture ==
- The park is featured in season one, episode ten of the animated series Thundarr the Barbarian.
- Lakeside Amusement Park is one of several parks featured in the 1999 public television program Great Old Amusement Parks.
- Scenes from the 1995 movie Things to Do in Denver When You're Dead were shot in the park.
- The park served as the basis for the fictional location "Lakefront Expo" in Fortnight, a novel about serial murders in Denver, set in 2034.
