= Biograd (disambiguation) =

Biograd or Biograd na Moru is a city in Zadar County, Croatia.

Biograd may also refer to:

- Székesfehérvár, a city in Hungary also known in Croatian as Stolni Biograd
- Biograd, Nevesinje, a village in Bosnia and Herzegovina
