= Saginaw County Fairgrounds Main Gate =

- U.S. National Register of Historic Places
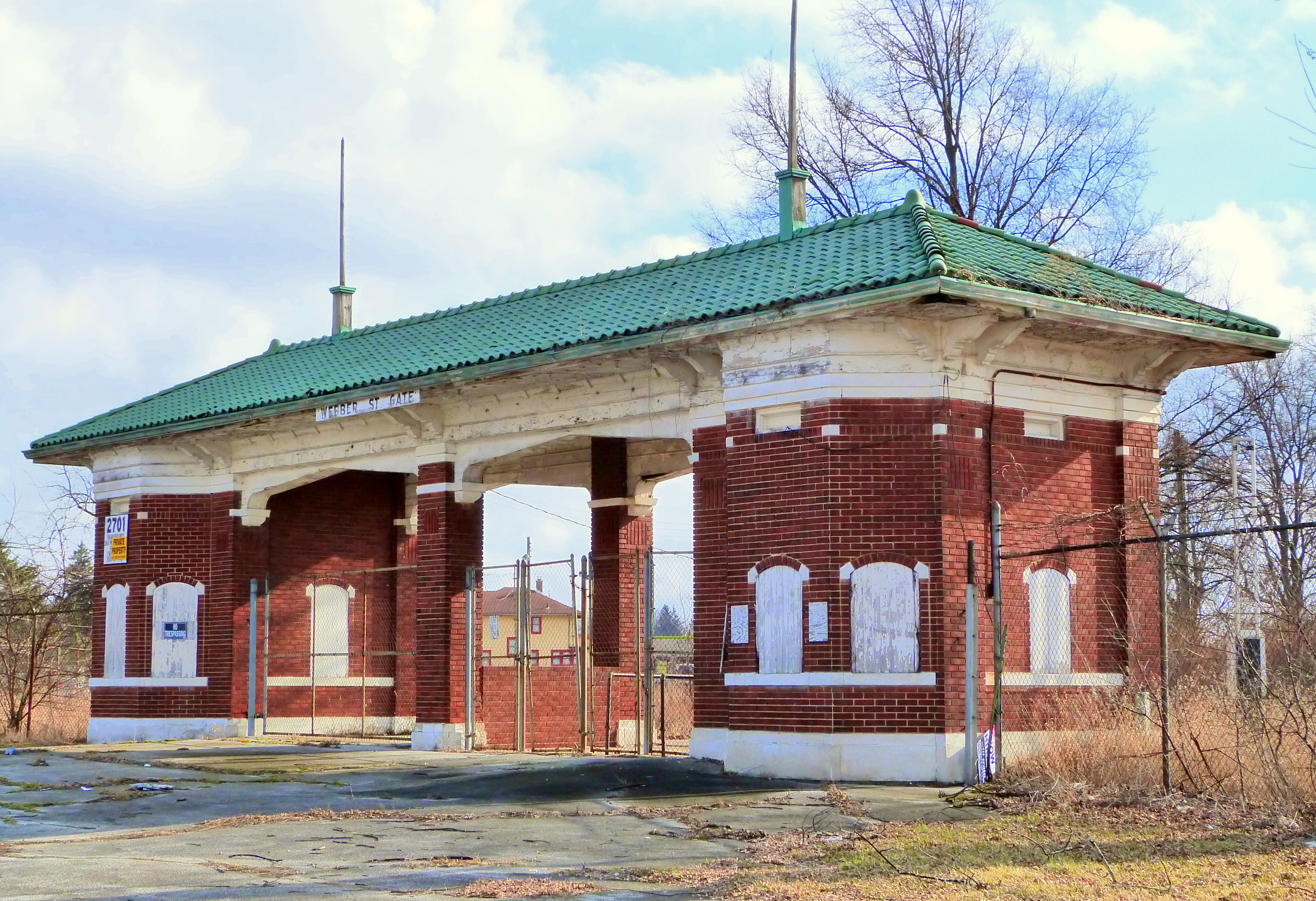
- Interactive map
- Location: 2701 E. Genesee Ave., Saginaw, Michigan
- Coordinates: 43°24′26″N 83°55′02″W
- Area: less than one acre
- Built: 1929
- Architect: Cowles & Mutscheller
- Architectural style: Craftsman
- NRHP reference No.: 14001045
- Added to NRHP: December 16, 2014

The Saginaw County Fairgrounds Main Gate is the entry gate to the former Saginaw County Fairgrounds, located at 2701 East Genesee Avenue in Saginaw, Michigan. It was listed on the National Register of Historic Places in 2014.

== History ==
The Saginaw County Fair was first held in 1866, and was held yearly until the mid-1890s, when the practice lapsed. A new Saginaw County Agricultural Society was formed in 1914, and they held a fair at what was then the Saginaw Driving Club grounds. In 1917, the Society purchased the Driving Club property and began making improvements. By 1919, several buildings had been constructed on the property. In the 1920s, three new gates to the fairgrounds were constructed. This included the main gate, designed by Saginaw architects Cowles & Mutscheller in 1929. The gate was intended to be the main point of entry for both pedestrians and automobiles, and had small offices for ticket-takers.

The gate served as the main entry to the fairgrounds until 2001, after which the Saginaw County Fair moved to a new fairgrounds outside of in Chesaning, Michigan. The old fairgrounds property was purchased by the Saginaw Housing Commission in 2002, and most of the fairground buildings were demolished in 2009. The main gate was left standing, with the intention of creating a small memorial park.

== Description ==
The Saginaw County Fairgrounds Main Gate is an Arts and Crafts structure measuring sixty feet long by fifteen feet deep. The gate contains a ticket office at each end, with side-by-side pedestrian and automobile gates in the center. It is built from red paving bricks, and has a limestone base, window sill-level beltcourses, and window impost blocks. A green clay Spanish tile hip roof tops the structure, supported by paired and single brackets.
