= White City, Florida =

White City may refer to:

- White City, Gulf County, Florida, an unincorporated community northeast of Port St. Joe
- White City, St. Lucie County, Florida, an unincorporated community and census-designated place south of Fort Pierce
