= White City (band) =

- Origin: Kabul, Afghanistan
- Genres: Punk, alternative rock, post-grunge
- Years active: 2006–present
- Label: Independent.
- Members: Andreas "Andronik" Stefansson; Travis "Travka" Beard; Ruth "Ru" Owen
- Past members: Charlie Putz; Sébastien Duhaut; Alexandre Habert; Clément Bourse; Richard Curfew; Pieter Leenknegt; Pernille Mortensen; Alain Chochois; Captain Archibald; Diego Cameno; Trygve Vold; James McLeod-Hatch; Matt Swift; Maral Afsharian
- Website: www.whitecitykabul.com

White City was a progressive/punk/rock band, based in Kabul, Afghanistan. The current line-up consists of Ruth Owen (UK), on bass and lead vocals, Travis Beard (Australia) on guitar and backing vocals and Andreas Stefansson (Sweden) on drums and backing vocals.

== Origins ==
White City was formed circa June 2007, playing mostly covers. The initial core of the band was Aurélien de Saint André and Charlie Putz, who formed a short lived band called "The Kablues Band", with bassist Jeremy Foster and longtime member Andreas Stefansson.

The name "White City" refers to a security status imposing on all UN personnel a strict curfew during a period of high security tensions. It was suggested to the band in June 2007 at a European Commission party, which a lot of people couldn't attend because of a white city security status.

== Line-up and musical evolution ==
During the early years of the band, many members came and went and the musical style of the band was in perpetual evolution, from jazz-fusion to indie rock. In late 2007, the band met Pernille Mortensen, from Denmark, who joined as a vocalist. By January 2008, Alexandre and Richard had left the band, leaving the 3 other members without a bass player and a second guitarist. Charlie Putz then called on fellow-countryman Archibald Gallet. Archie introduced Alain Chochois to the band, a Frenchman who would become their new bass player with Archie on second guitar. At this point, White City was playing gigs almost every week-end. New additions to the band were Clement, also from France, on harmonica and trumpet and Diego from Spain on sax,

May 2008 arrived and Charlie Putz left, followed shortly afterward by Alain. The band then recruited Travis Beard as their new bass player who would be a major factor of the band’s radical evolution throughout the following months. Travis set up a recording studio in his house [Tora Bora Studios] and White City recorded their own material for the first time ever at Awaz Studios. The band would then play their first gigs outside Kabul, in NATO military bases in the north of the country.

From 2008 to 2009, the band also saw Norwegian Trygve Vold on guitar, bass and banjo, Australian Matthew Swift on drums, British DJ James McLeod-Harch on decks and Iranian singer Maral Afsharian on vocals. In 2008, White City with the line-up: Beard, Stefansson, Afsharian, McLeod-Hatch, Gallet and Mortensen headed off to Tajikistan, for the band's first tour outside Afghanistan where they played 5 concerts including the first "guerrilla gig", which would become a White City stock-in-trade at a sanatorium up in the mountains above Dushanbe. During this tour, their sound progressed towards hard-rock, writing the original composition and popular audience song, 'Piva' on tour.

== Current line-up ==
In September 2009 former drummer, Matthew Swift, (now playing with ex-pat band Khyberzoo) introduced Ruth Owen to the band at Tora Bora Studios. After an informal jam, Owen, who took the stage-name, Ru, was asked to join the band. Ru arrived with her own songs and the band scaled down to a power trio, with the occasional collaboration of Archie Gallet. For a year the band concentrated on writing with a sound influenced by stoner rock and post-punk and performed around Kabul refining the new sound of White City.

Due to conservative neighbors, Travis was forced to relocate to a new abode where he set up a new studio in the garage. The studio construction was made up mainly of sandbags, hence the studio was duly named Tora Bora Bunker [doubling as a bunker in case of attack]. Here White City dug their heels in and locked themselves in weekend after weekend polishing their sound and working on their original songs. The period from late 2009 to early 2011 saw a burgeoning of rock bands in the Kabul scene, such as Afghan bands Kabul Dreams, District Unknown and White Page and international bands Khyberzoo, The Internationals and Ceilings of Nork. These bands often supported each other in shared concerts around Kabul.

In 2011, the band embarked on the realization of an idea that had been knocking around since the 2008 Tajik tour - to play every country ending in 'Stan. It took a year of planning and writing for the band before they were ready to set off on the 'Big In The Stans' tour. In the last month before the tour, Andreas moved into Travis and Ru's house, known among local musicians as the 'House Of Rock'.

== Big In The Stans Tour ==
In March 2011, the band, consisting of Stefansson, Beard and Owen left Kabul, Afghanistan for Dushanbe, Tajikistan. For six weeks they toured Central Asia visiting Kyrgyzstan, Kazakhstan and Uzbekistan before returning to Kabul for a hiatus and their biggest Afghanistan concert, so far, the sold-out 500 capacity cinema at the French Cultural Center.

During the tour, in addition to formal concerts, the band played several "guerrilla gigs" on the streets of Dushanbe, Bishkek, Almaty and Tashkent with one gig on a Soviet-era train from Tashkent to Bukhara.

On tour, White City met a large number of Central Asian rock bands, some of whom they would bring to Kabul in September 2011 for Afghanistan's first ever rock festival, Sound Central, which was created by guitarist, Beard. Ru started to shoot a documentary called "Big In The Stans" about the tour.

In July 2011, the band started the second leg of the Big In The Stans tour, travelling to Islamabad and Lahore in Pakistan. They recorded a five-song EP at True Brew Records in Lahore. They released their debut EP, Space Cadet, on July 19, 2012 along with an accompanying video, which saw Travka being interviewed at the BBC's Olympic studios.

In 2013, with the situation in Afghanistan worsening, the band de-camped to Colombo, Sri Lanka, where they wrote the bulk of their debut album, Landlocked. In September 2013, they travelled to London and recorded the album with producer Jaime Gomez Arellano.

Landlocked was released in February 2014.

In 2013 it was announced that White City had been chosen to play music and film festival SXSW in Austin, Texas.

== Band biographies ==
Andreas (drums, backing vox) - Swedish - the only original member of White City, first visited Afghanistan in 2000. Brought up in communes in Sri Lanka, he worked with NGOs for over a decade.

Ru: (vox, bass) - British - a video journalist and film maker, she came to Afghanistan in 2009 due to extreme boredom with her hometown of London. She's making a documentary about the tour.

Travka: (guitar, sounds) - Australian - a videographer/photographer, he came into Afghanistan with the American invasion in 2001. He taught photojournalism at Aina in 2006. Co-founded Skateistan in 2007. Co-founder of the Kabul Knights Motorcycle Club in 2007. He is one of the founders of Combat Communications: an Afghanistan-based artists collective. Serving as a focal point for local musicians and mentors several up and coming Afghan bands, he's currently making a documentary about the Kabul music scene.
