= Lakeside, Colorado =

Town in Colorado, United States

Town of Lakeside, Colorado
- Statutory Town
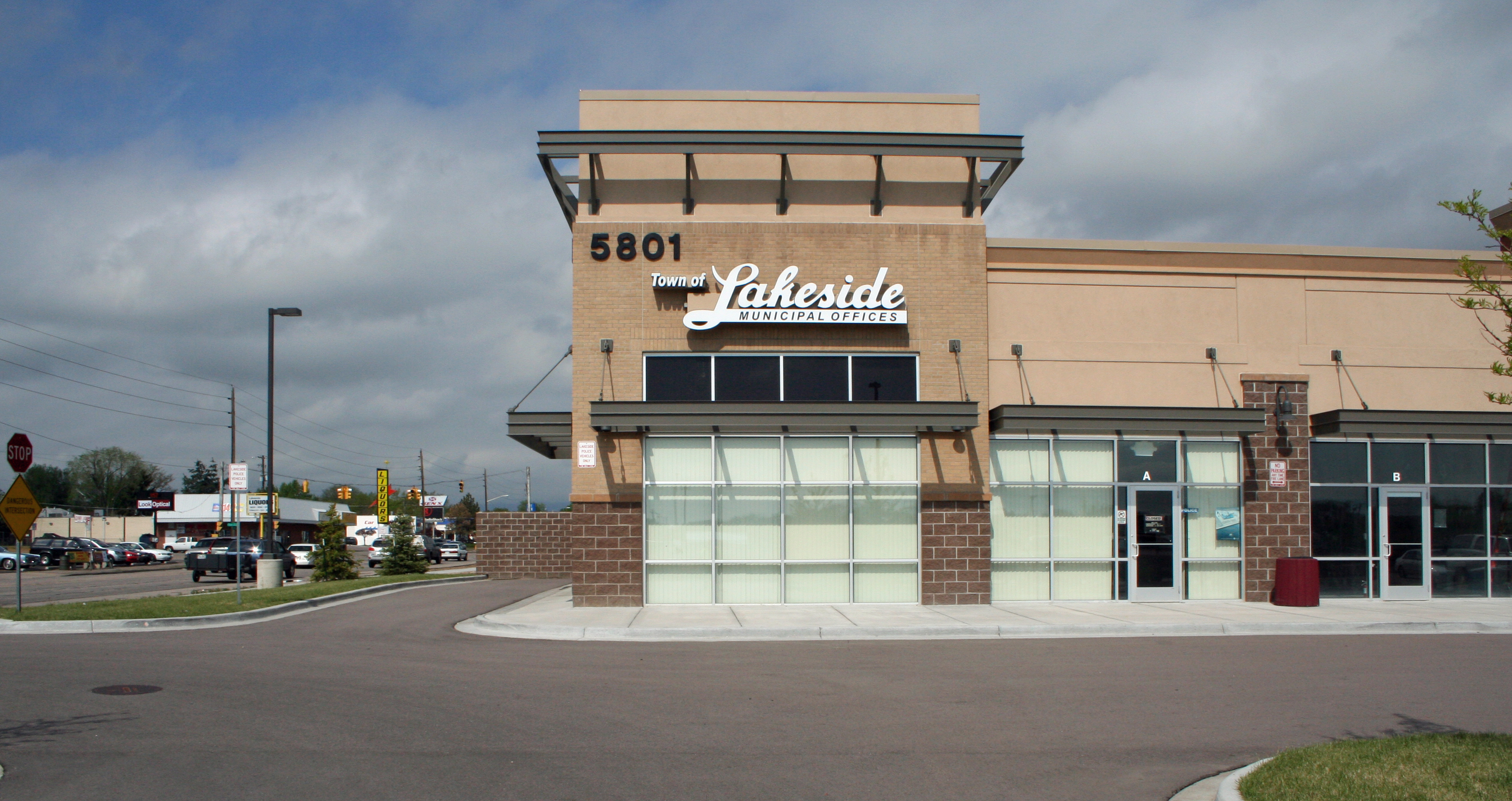
- The municipal offices of the Town of Lakeside.

- Location of Lakeside in Jefferson County, Colorado.
- Coordinates: 39°46′49″N 105°03′28″W
- Country: United States
- State: Colorado
- County: Jefferson County
- Incorporated: November 25, 1907

Government
  - Type: Statutory Town

Area
  - Total: 0.25 sq mi (0.64 km^{2})
  - Land: 0.19 sq mi (0.49 km^{2})
  - Water: 0.062 sq mi (0.16 km^{2})
- Elevation: 5,341 ft (1,628 m)

Population (2020)
  - Total: 16
  - Density: 85/sq mi (33/km^{2})
- Time zone: UTC-7 (MST)
  - Summer (DST): UTC-6 (MDT)
- ZIP code: Denver CO 80212
- Area codes: Both 303 and 720
- FIPS code: 08-42495
- GNIS feature ID: 2412865
- Website: www.lakeside.town
- The least populous Colorado municipality

The Town of Lakeside is a statutory town in Jefferson County, Colorado, United States. The town population was 16 at the 2020 United States census, making Lakeside the least populous municipality in Colorado. Lakeside is immediately west of the City and County of Denver, the most populous municipality in the state. The Alcott Post Office (ZIP Code 80212) serves Lakeside.

The town's namesake lake is Lake Rhoda, which covers 20% of its total area. A year after its incorporation on November 12, 1907, the Lakeside Amusement Park, nicknamed "White City", opened on the eastern shores. Both town and park were founded by a syndicate led by prominent Denver brewer Adolph Zang, who endeavored to build the resort just across the county line from Denver, and incorporated to move beyond the reach of Denver liquor laws. A shopping mall, Lakeside Center, was built in 1956 on the southern shore, but fell into financial troubles due to lack of business around the turn of the century and was converted into a Walmart and strip mall circa 2010. The amusement park, shopping area, and lake occupy almost all of the tiny municipality. Residences are limited to a handful of houses in the southeast corner of the town occupied by employees of the amusement park.

== Geography ==
According to the United States Census Bureau, the town has a total area of 0.2 square miles (0.52 km^{2}), of which, 0.2 square miles (0.52 km^{2}) of it is land and 0.1 square miles (0.26 km^{2}) of it (20.83%) is water.

== Demographics ==
Historical population
Census	Pop.	Note	%±
1910	103		—
1920	36		−65.0%
1930	49		36.1%
1940	39		−20.4%
1950	46		17.9%
1960	28		−39.1%
1970	17		−39.3%
1980	19		11.8%
1990	11		−42.1%
2000	20		81.8%
2010	8		−60.0%
2020	16		100.0%

== See also ==
- Front Range Urban Corridor
- North Central Colorado Urban Area
