= White City (Bellingham) =

Former amusement park in Bellingham, Washington

Coordinates: 48.7668°N 122.4146°W

White City was an amusement park located at Lake Whatcom's Silver Beach in Bellingham, Washington.

White City opened in 1906 and closed in 1919. The park had a wooden roller coaster, plus a hotel, dance hall and an ice cream parlor. White City was named because of its "white" electric lights.
