= White City (New Orleans) =

Coordinates: 29.968°N 90.106°W

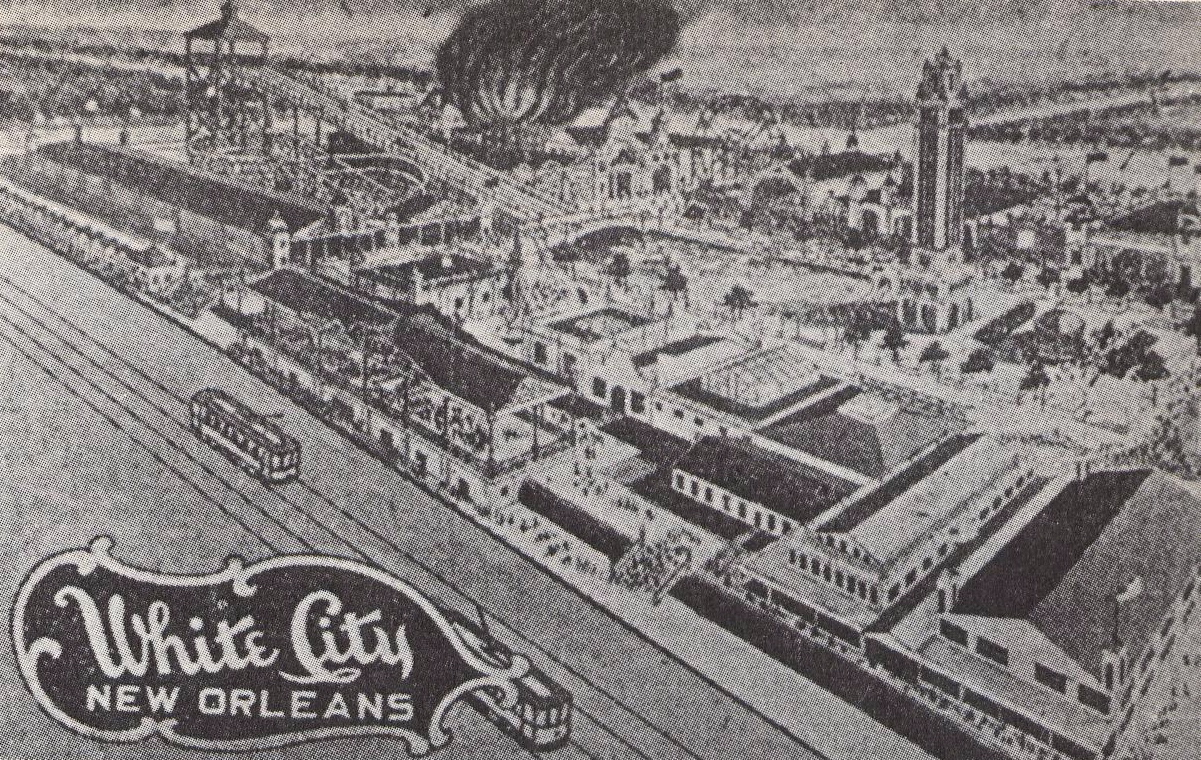
"White City" in 1908

White City was an amusement park in New Orleans, Louisiana, functioning from 1907 to 1913. It was located in what became part of Mid-City New Orleans, only recently opened for development at the time after improvements in drainage.

Promoter Charles C. Mathews advertised the opening of the park on 4 May 1907. In addition to amusement rides, the park offered musical performances, including opera.

After the park closed, Pelican Stadium was built at the site at Carrollton and Tulane Avenues.
