= Luna Park Sydney =

Amusement park in Sydney, Australia

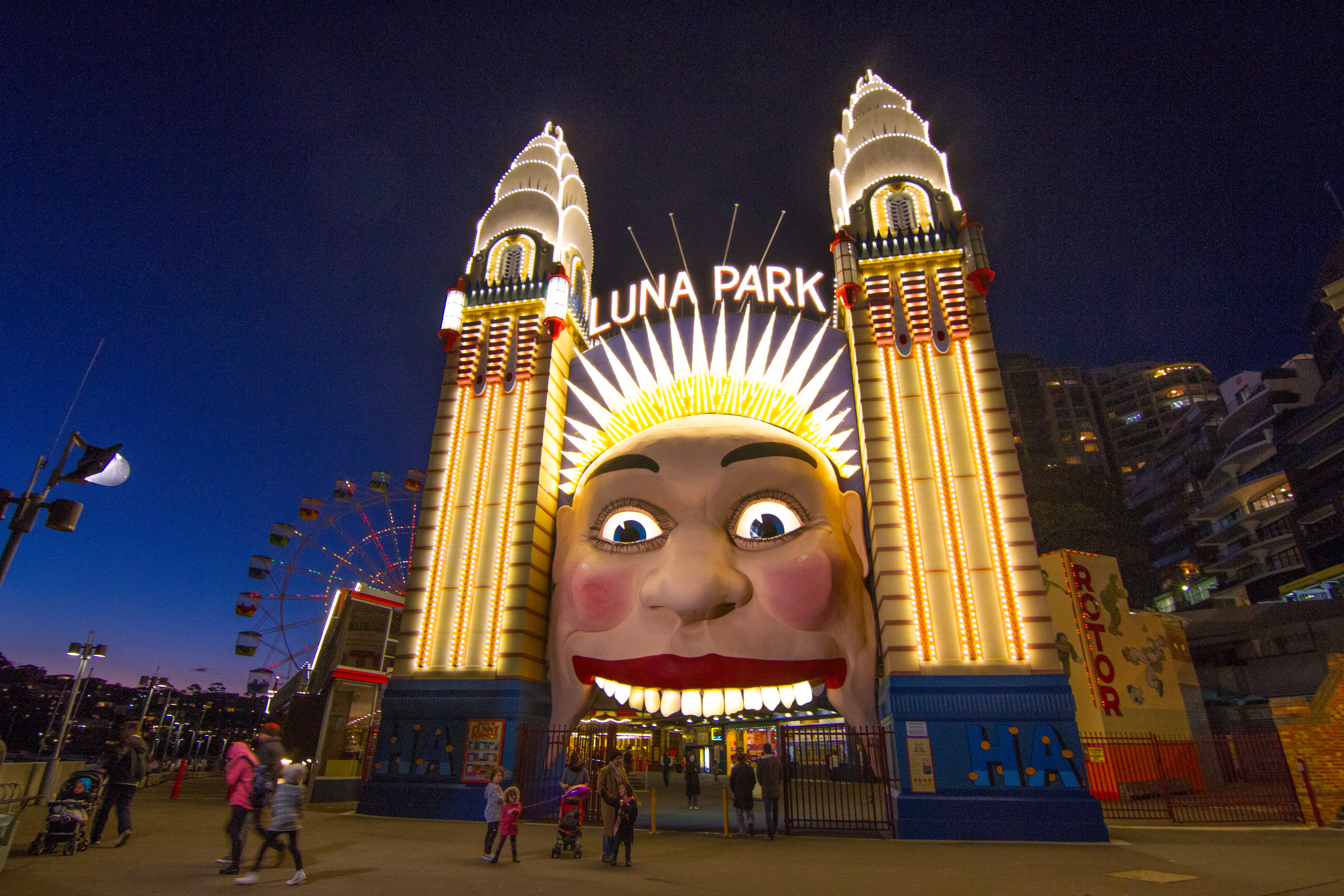
- The Face, Luna Park's main entrance
- Interactive map of Luna Park Sydney
- Location: 1 Olympic Drive, Milsons Point, New South Wales, Australia
- Coordinates: 33°50′51″S 151°12′36″E
- Status: Operating
- Public transit: Milsons Point railway station Milsons Point ferry wharf
- Opened: 4 October 1935; 91 years ago
- Owner: Luna Park Reserve Trust
- Operated by: Oscars Group
- General manager: John Hughes
- Slogan: Just For Fun!
- Operating season: Year round

Attractions
- Total: 23
- Roller coasters: 4
- Website: www.lunaparksydney.com

Luna Park Precinct
- Location within inner Sydney
- 33°50′51″S 151°12′36″E

History
- Built: 1935–

Site notes
- Architects: Rupert Browne; Herman Phillips
- Owner: Luna Park Reserve Trust

New South Wales Heritage Register
- Official name: Luna Park Precinct; Entrance Face and Towers; Crystal Palace; Coney Island; Alfred Street Entrance; Wild Mouse; Sandstone cliff;
- Type: State heritage (complex / group)
- Designated: 5 March 2010
- Reference no.: 1811
- Type: Funfair
- Category: Recreation and Entertainment
- Builders: Stuart Brothers Ltd; David Atkins; Ted ('Hoppy') Hopkins

Luna Park Sydney is a heritage-listed amusement park located in Milsons Point, New South Wales, Australia, on the northern shore of Sydney Harbour. It is one of Sydney's most famous landmarks and has had a significant impact on culture through the years, including being featured as a filming location for several movies and television shows.

The site is owned by the Luna Park Reserve Trust, an agency of the Government of New South Wales, and the amusement park is operated by hospitality company Oscars Group. It is protected by government legislation, namely the Luna Park Site Act 1990, which specifically protects the site and sets it aside for the purpose of an amusement park. Several of the park's buildings and rides are also listed on the New South Wales State Heritage Register and the (now defunct) Register of the National Estate.

The park was constructed during 1935, approximately 600 metres (2,000 ft) from the northern approaches of the Sydney Harbour Bridge. It was an extremely popular attraction during World War II and the post-war period. The park suddenly closed in mid-1979 after the Ghost Train fire which killed six children and one adult. Most of the park was demolished and new rides installed, reopening in 1982. From April to August of that year, the park operated under the name Harbourside Amusement Park. The park was closed again in 1988 as an independent engineering inspection determined that several rides needed urgent repair. The owners failed to repair and reopen the park before a Government of New South Wales deadline, and ownership was passed to a new body.

The park reopened in 1995, but closed yet again within thirteen months due to noise complaints about the Big Dipper rollercoaster from local residents, which led to reduced hours and a drop in attendance that made the park unsustainable to run. Luna Park opened only sporadically for the next nine years, including for special charity events and as a filming location. After another redevelopment, it reopened in 2004 and has continued operating ever since.

== History ==
=== Pre-colonisation to 1830s: Establishment of Milsons Point ===
The Cammeraygal people are the traditional owners of the North Sydney area, having lived there for at least 5,000 years.

After the arrival of the First Fleet in 1788, a block of land between Lavender Bay and Careening Cove was granted by colonial authorities to a private soldier named Robert Ryan. This land passed down via surveyor-general Charles Grimes to politician Robert Campbell by 1805, with James Milson later settling there in the 1820s.

In 1830, Jamaican ex-convict Billy Blue commenced the first ferry service across Sydney Harbour. By 1837, a regular wharf and waterman's service was operating from the site now known as Milsons Point. A regular vehicular ferry was operating by 1860, joined by a tram line to North Sydney in 1886. The North Shore railway line opened in 1890, and was extended to Milsons Point in 1893.

=== 1915 to 1935: From New York to Glenelg ===
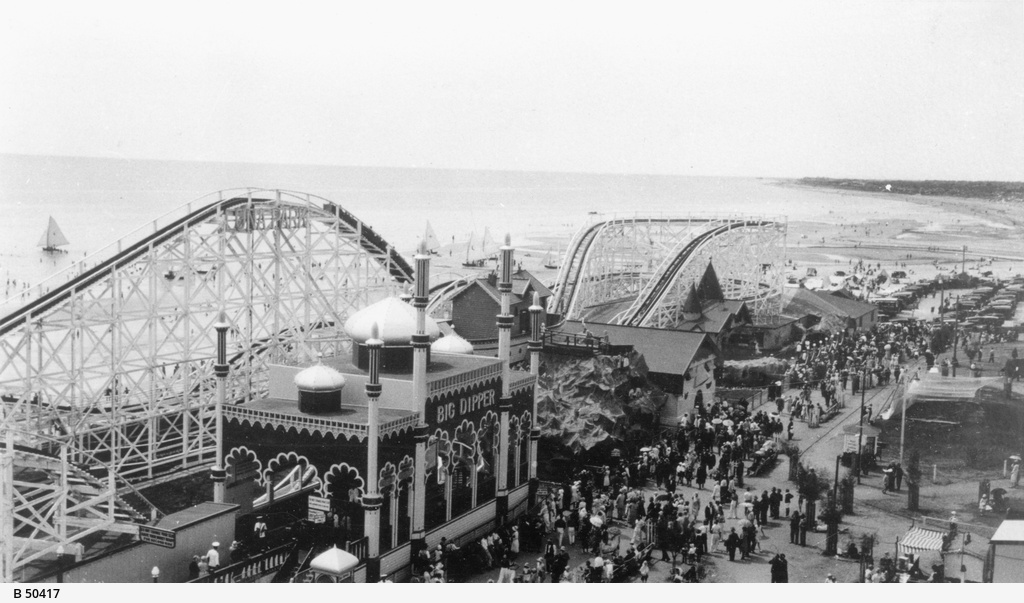
Luna Park Glenelg. Rides from this park formed the basis of its subsequent Sydney counterpart.

The first Luna Park was opened at Coney Island, New York in 1903. The first Luna Park in Australia opened in St Kilda, Melbourne in 1912, followed by Luna Park Glenelg in Adelaide in 1930.

From 1924 onwards, the future site of Luna Park Sydney was used extensively by Dorman Long to fabricate and assemble steel components for the Sydney Harbour Bridge, which officially opened in 1932. Once the bridge was completed, North Sydney Council opened up applications for tenders to develop the site.

At the same time, the owners of Luna Park Glenelg—‌Herman Phillips, his brothers, and A.A.Abrahams—‌happened to be searching for a new location to establish the park due to difficulties with their local council and residents.

Phillips and his associates won the tender for the North Sydney site and began a 20-year lease on 11 September 1935, forming Luna Park (NSW) Limited. The rides from Glenelg were dismantled and transported to Sydney over a three-month period—‌an elaborate process undertaken by Stuart Brothers under the direction of David Atkins, Ted Hopkins and Arthur Barton. Construction of the park employed almost 1,000 engineers, structural workers, fitters, and artists. Architectural plans and drawings of the park from this era are held at the State Library of New South Wales.

There were noise complaints and protests from North Shore residents against the park's construction as early as April 1935, before it had even opened. Members of a "Parks and Playgrounds Movement" were quoted as saying the park was the result of "a deplorable lack of aesthetic taste", and akin to "Coney Island under the Tower of London"— ‌as in, not worthy of proximity to the Sydney Harbour Bridge. These sorts of complaints would turn out to be a theme throughout the park's history.

=== 1935 to 1969: Official opening and heyday ===
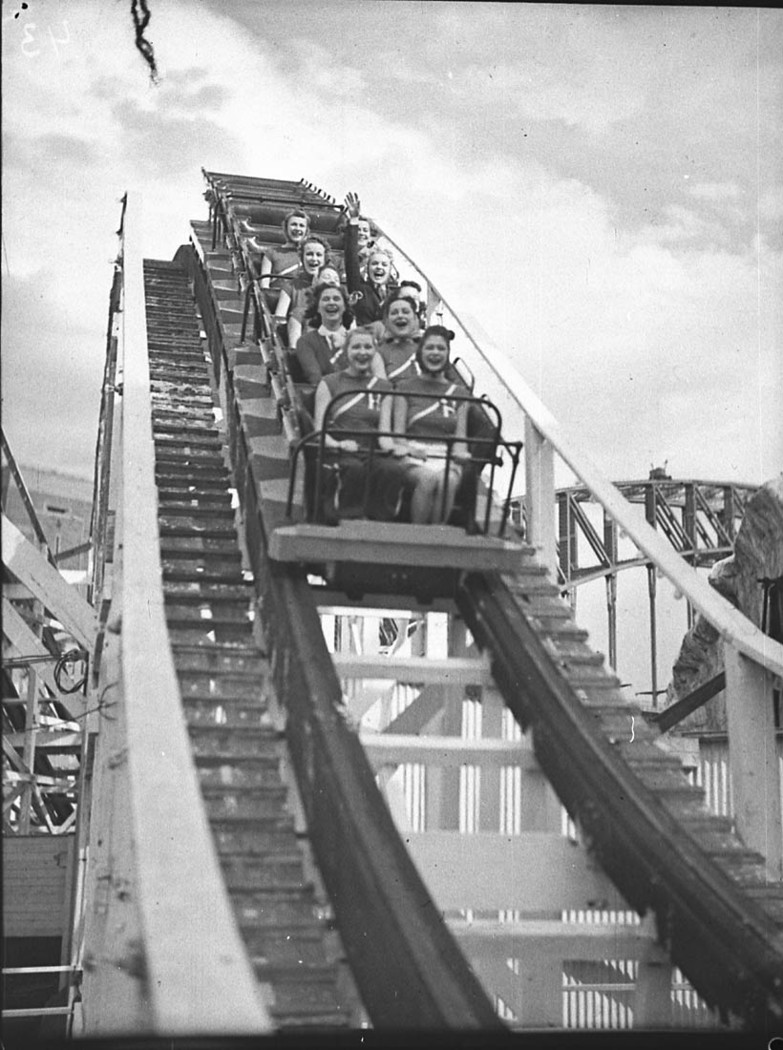
Performers from the Hollywood Hotel revue riding the Big Dipper in 1938.

On 4 October 1935, Luna Park Sydney was officially opened to immediate success. The park's signature entrance face, designed by Rupert Browne, was placed between two Art Deco-style towers with spires imitating New York's Chrysler Building. The Big Dipper roller coaster was an instantly popular attraction. After a successful opening season, the park closed down for the winter months so that rides and attractions could be overhauled and repainted, and new ones could be added. In 1936, the North Sydney Olympic Pool was also opened on an adjacent site.

During World War II, Luna Park was a magnet for servicemen, many of whom were either treating their girlfriends to a night out or looking to meet someone. The influx of servicemen also drew sex workers to the area and large-scale brawls were a common occurrence, usually between Australian home defence troops and American sailors on shore leave. As non-essential uses of electricity were curtailed in wartime, the park's neon lights were disconnected and many ride facades were dimmed. The park's external lights were also 'browned out' in case of a Japanese sneak attack on Sydney.

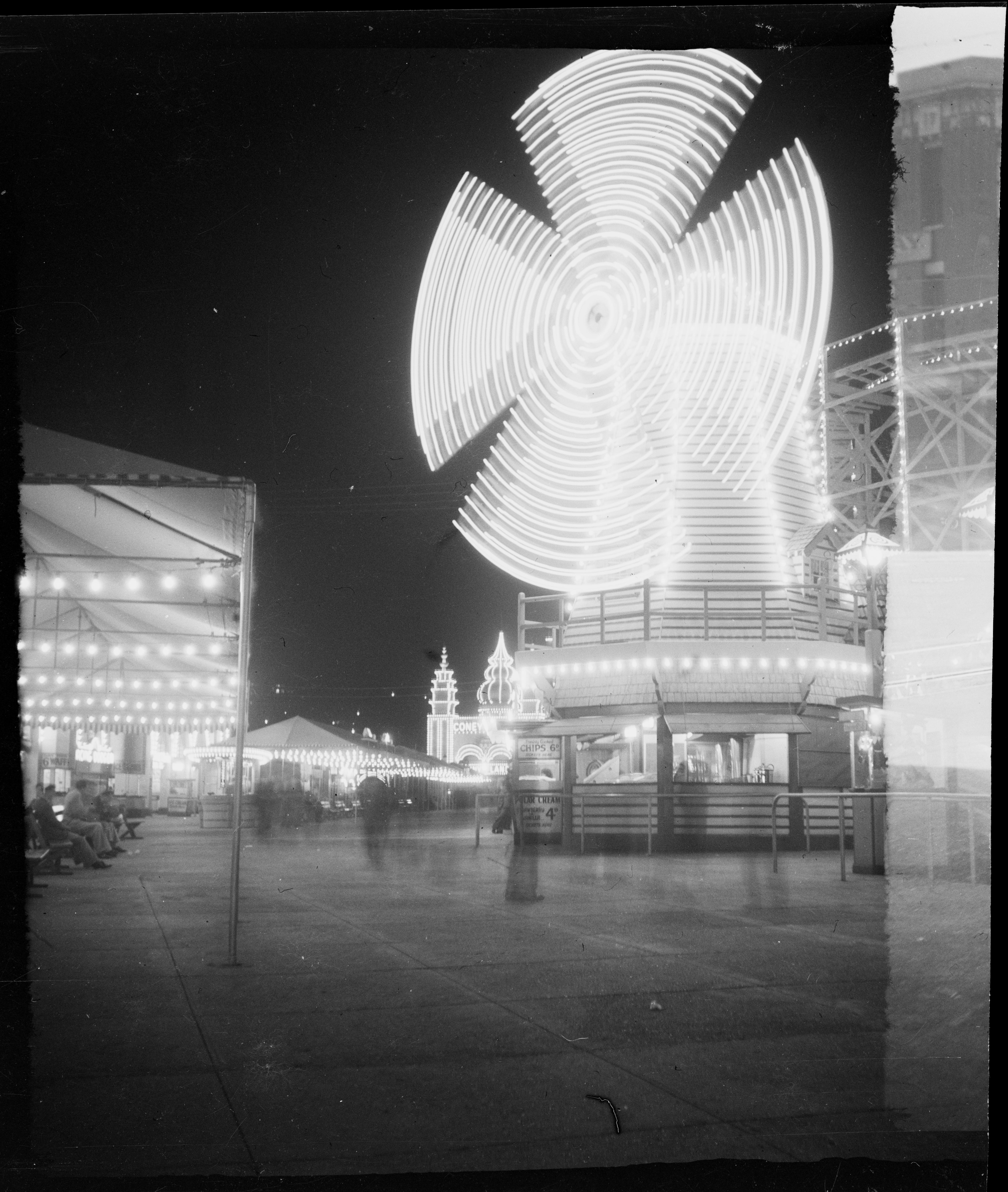
Luna Park lighted windmill, Nov 1948

In 1950, the Phillips brothers were bought out by Atkins & Hopkins. Numerous changes and additions were made over the next few years, as the two men travelled the world to bring back new concepts from amusement parks in the Netherlands, the United States, Germany and Britain. A version of the Rotor—‌a spinning drum that uses centrifugal force to pin guests to the sides, developed by Professor Ernst Hoffmeister in Germany—‌was constructed and installed, and became the stage of many stunts. It remains in place today. Barton also redesigned and reconstructed the park's entrance face, which had begun to sag and distort. The new design was based on illustrations of Old King Cole, and became the inspiration for all future variants.

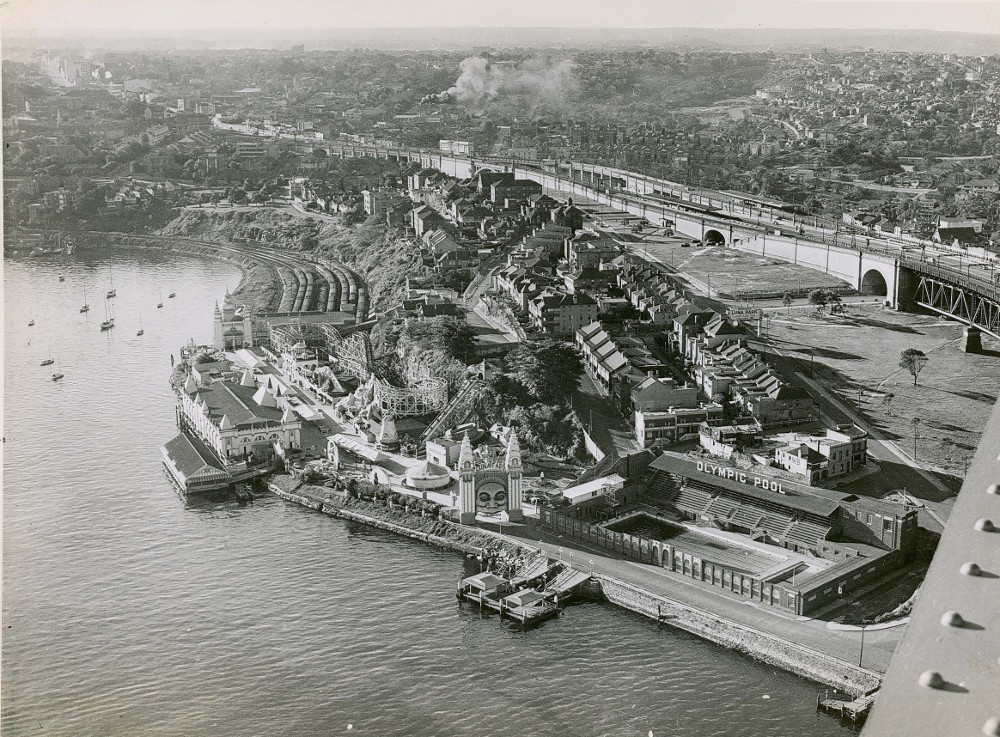
Luna Park and Milsons Point, as seen from the Harbour Bridge.

Atkins' passing in 1957 saw Hopkins become the park's manager. Meanwhile, the rise of television and car culture throughout the 1960s saw the park facing increased competition. Several initiatives were attempted to maintain public interest throughout this era, including the installation of the Wild Mouse roller coaster and the hiring of silhouette artist S. John Ross.

=== 1969 to 1979: New ownership and Martin Sharp involvement ===
Hopkins retired in 1969 and sold the remaining six years of the park's lease to World Trade Centre Pty Ltd. Winter closures were abandoned under this new management, meaning there was no opportunity to carry out regular maintenance works on the rides. Barton also retired in 1970, the last of the park's original showmen.

Soon after this, the new owners applied to construct a $50 million international trade centre on the Luna Park site, consisting of seven high-rise buildings, 929,000 square metres (10,000,000 sq ft) of exhibition space, and a heliport. However, this plan was rejected by the Government of New South Wales. After a reshuffle within the consortium, the decision was made to continue operation as an amusement park.

Over the next few years, the new managers scrapped several of the old rides and replacing them with new, American-designed thrill rides. After consultation with Hanna-Barbera, Luna Park's slogan was temporarily changed from "Just for Fun" to "The Place Where Happiness Is". Another result of the consultation was the creation of a short-lived park mascot, "Luna Bear - the Space Age Koala."

In 1973, Martin Sharp and Peter Kingston undertook repainting works on the park in a pop art style. The face was repainted with a new expression and a clown-like mask, offset by strong primary colours. Sharp would turn out to play a major role in the park's history in the decades to come.

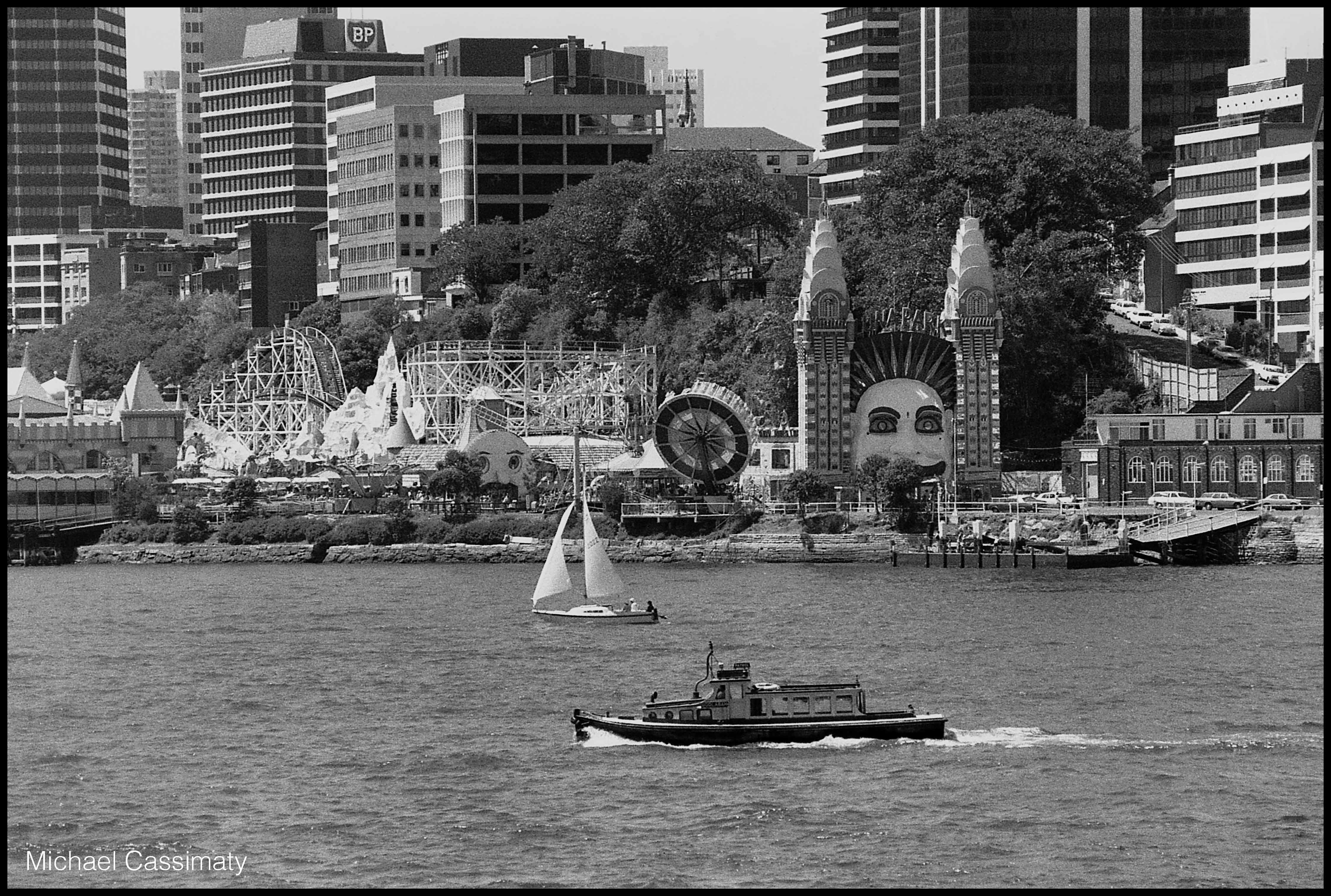
The park in 1975, featuring Martin Sharp's repainted face.

By 1975, Luna Park was operating on a week-to-week lease with plans to develop the Lavender Bay foreshores as a "Tivoli Gardens". When the park's lease expired that same year, the directors went into negotiation with the New South Wales government to renew it. However, when Neville Wran became Premier in 1976 the negotiations ground to a halt, and the park was allowed to continue operating.

In 1977, an exhibition was held at the Art Gallery of New South Wales entitled Fairground Arts and Novelties, highlighting many important aspects of Luna Park. Meanwhile, Sharp and Kingston, as well as Richard Liney and Garry Shead, were involved in many major redesigns and artwork installations throughout the park. Sharp was quoted as saying:

It took us a while to realise that Luna Park was an artwork in itself, a city state of illusion, a brilliant feat of engineering with imagination, created and maintained by men. Sydney must acknowledge the importance of Luna Park. To lose it now would be a tragedy.

=== 1979: Big Dipper accident, Ghost Train fire, and closure ===
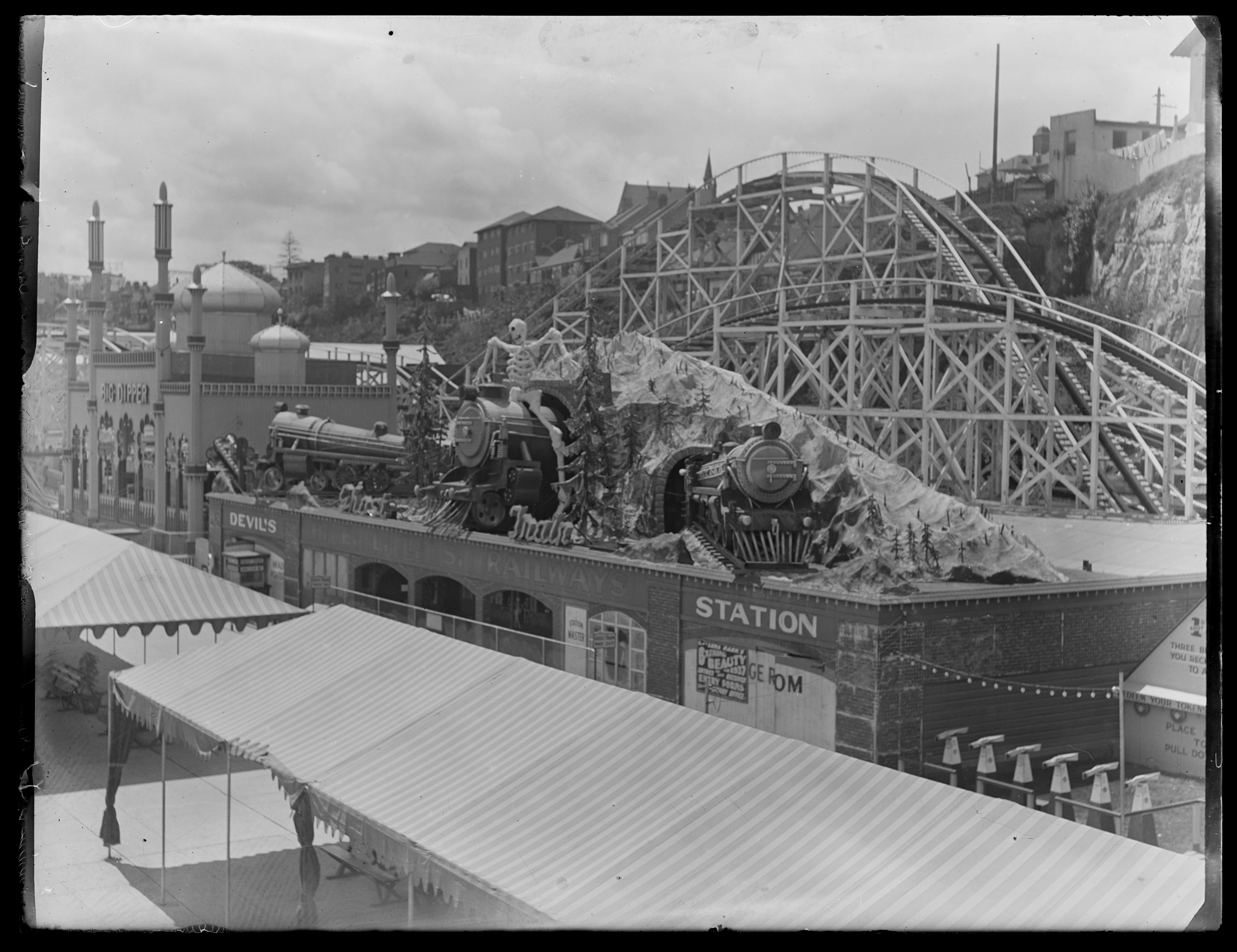
The Ghost Train, Luna Park Sydney, c. 1955

On 16 April 1979, a steel runner came loose on the Big Dipper, halting one train and leading to a collision with another. Thirteen people were injured.

On 9 June 1979, the park's Ghost Train burnt down during operation. The fire quickly destroyed the ride, although it was contained before spreading to the nearby Big Dipper and River Caves. Searches of the charred rubble revealed the bodies of seven people: John Godson and his two children, Damien and Craig, and four Waverley College students, Jonathan Billings, Richard Carroll, Michael Johnson, and Seamus Rahilly. The park was immediately shut down.

Sydney newspapers and the NSW Police reported at the time that the fire was caused by an electrical fault. A contemporaneous coronial inquest was unable to establish the cause of the fire, but concluded that Luna Park's managers and operators had failed in their duty of care towards the park's patrons. Theories emerged in the decades following that allege the blaze was deliberately lit by associates of Abe Saffron in an attempt to gain control of the park site, which were supported by investigations led by Sharp and the testimony of multiple eyewitnesses and NSW police officers. These claims have been rebutted by Milton Cockburn in The Assassination of Neville Wran, (Connor Court 2024).

=== 1980 to 1990: Friends of Luna Park campaign and Harbourside ownership ===
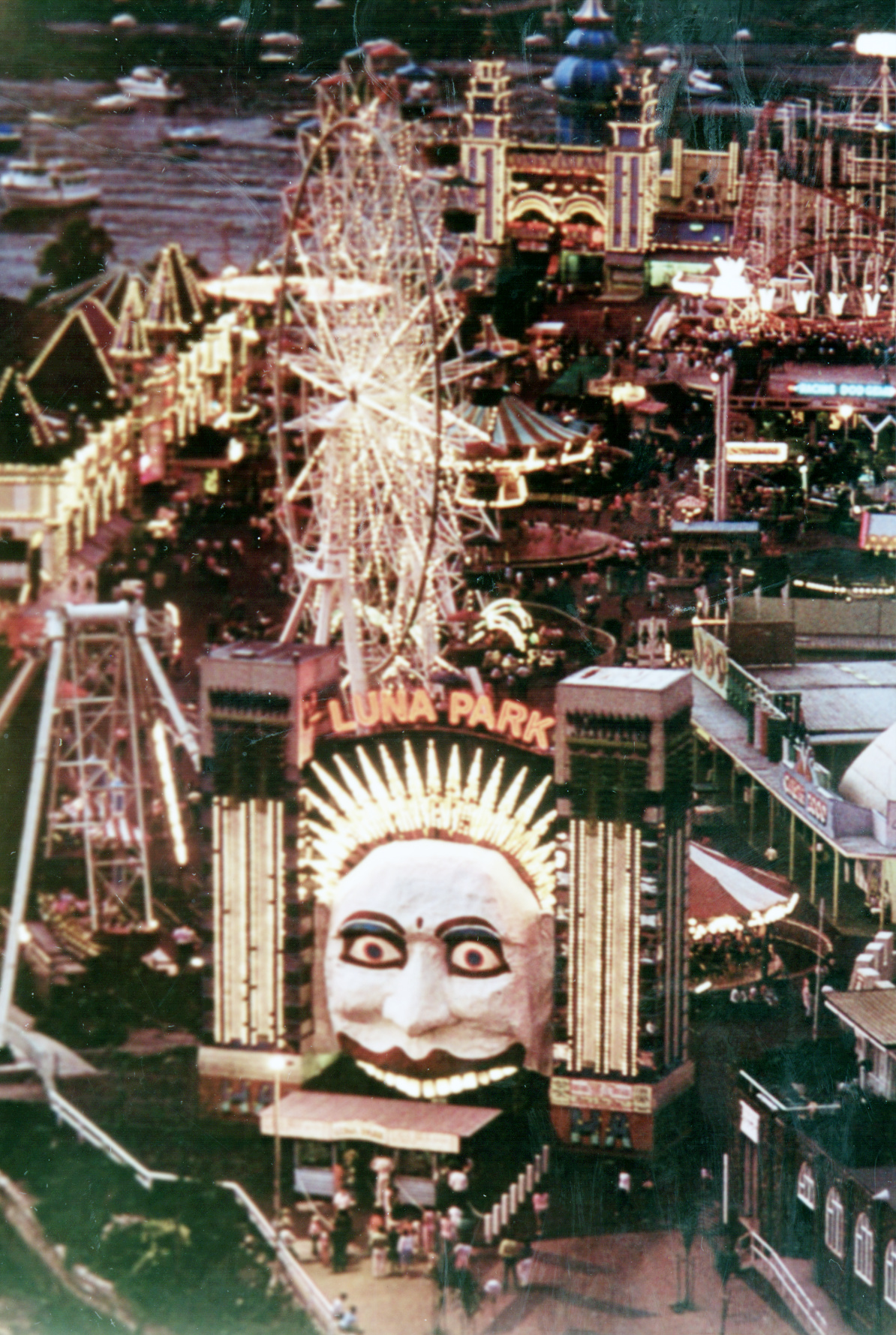
The park, circa 1982

The NSW government called for tenders for the site's development at the end of July 1979. and again in March 1980.

Meanwhile, a group named "Friends of Luna Park" was formed by impassioned community members. A "Save Luna Park" protest marched from the Opera House to the 'face', followed by a free concert headlined by Mental As Anything. As a result, the Face was an item of national heritage by the National Trust of Australia and the rest of the park was given a 'recorded' classification.

Australian Amusements Associates won the tender in September 1980, and took over administration of the site in early June 1981. Much of the original park was then either demolished or sold off. Later that year, the Luna Park Site Act was passed, meaning Luna Park Holdings had to vacate the site. Everything that remained—‌with the exception of the Face, Crystal Palace, Rotor and Coney Island—‌was bulldozed and burnt.

The park was then rebuilt by Australian Amusements, following design advice from Texas-based LARC International. It reopened as the "Harbourside Amusement Park" on 29 April 1982. The change in name was caused by a dispute between the current and previous owners, preventing the use of the Luna Park name until August of that year.

Over the next six years, the entrance face was removed from over the entry gates on two occasions. The owners of Harbourside were involved in two disputes with the Department of Public Works, and one director was the subject of an inquiry by the Corporate Affairs Commission. Reports from independent engineers were then presented stating that several rides in the park had to be shut down for "renovations and repairs". The park closed again in 1988. The entrance face was moved inside of the park, and the towers were demolished.

Harbourside's lease was then transferred to Luna Park Investments Pty Ltd. Within a year, after no efforts had been made to repair and reopen Luna Park, and several submissions hade been made to replace most or all of the amusement park with high-rise apartment blocks and hotels, the New South Wales State Government issued an ultimatum to the company: open Luna Park by 1 June 1990, or lose the lease. Despite this ultimatum, Luna Park Investments did little to prepare the site. Rides were moved around, repainted, and renamed to give the appearance that the new owners were trying to make an effort. The directors kept putting forward excuses to try to gain an extension, even declaring a trade union ban on their own site.

Four days after the government ultimatum passed, the lease was terminated and the Luna Park Reserve Trust was established. Soon after this, the National Heritage Trust added several buildings on the site to its list of protected structures.

On 12 October 1990, the Luna Park Site Act 1990 was gazetted, although the act had been used prior to this to terminate Harbourside's lease and establish the Luna Park Reserve Trust. The Act was intended to protect the site of the park, dedicating it for amusement and public recreation.

=== 1991 to 1995: Reconstruction ===
"Luna Park is magic and fantasy and dreams. Luna Park belongs to Sydney; it is far more than private enterprise; it is an institution with a fascinating history and folklore of its own... it is Sydney, past, present and future."

— Martin Sharp, 1994

In 1991, the first two stages of the three-stage redevelopment and restoration plan for Luna Park was given the green light, with $25 million granted by the Open Space and Heritage Fund towards the project. The third stage, involving the demolition of sections of the old North Shore railway line (which had been in use as a holding area for trains outside peak hour since 1932), construction of parkland, an amphitheatre, art gallery, and museum, was not approved.

In 1992, the Trust commissioned Godden Mackay heritage consultants to prepare a Conservation Plan for the site. The plans were approved by North Sydney Council in August 1992, with Ted Hopkins also supporting the plans shown to him. Work began in January 1993. An 'army' of tradesmen and artists worked for six months on the restoration of the park's buildings, and on the repair of numerous artworks, including several of Barton's murals. The entrance towers were rebuilt, and a new fibreglass face made by Natureworks was installed. The previous face was moved to storage owned by the Powerhouse Museum.

Most of the park's new rides would be provided by Wittingslow Amusements, many of them modern rides by HUSS which were named and themed after historical Luna Park attractions. Wittingslow also reintroduced the Wild Mouse to the park, which was previously removed in 1970. Luna Park's main attraction was to be the Big Dipper, a 40 metres (130 ft) tall looping coaster designed by Arrow Dynamics, named after the rollercoaster that operated from 1935 to 1979.

During the reconstruction, there was vocal opposition from a number of nearby residents and companies, on a variety of issues. The main points of opposition were the noise levels of the park after opening, and the installation of the Big Dipper. The Environmental Protection Authority approved the construction of the new Big Dipper on the condition that the Trust abided by strict noise control guidelines and covered the cost of soundproofing for any residents affected by excessive noise. In addition, North Sydney Council imposed a series of times when the roller coaster could not operate.

=== 1995 to 2001: Brief reopening, closure and redevelopment ===
Luna Park reopened in January 1995. In the months that followed, the park was affected by poor weather conditions, causing lower than predicted attendance. Legal claims against the operation of the park and roller coaster were filed by some local residents and supported by business figures whose tenders for the redevelopment had not been accepted. The newly elected Carr government put the park's long-term viability in doubt; first removing the government guarantee of a $14 million loan to the trust, then dissolving the trust's board of directors and appointing an administrator. The park was forced to close again on 14 February 1996.

In 1997 the Department of Land & Water Conservation (DLWC) engaged the Urban Design Advisory Service (UDAS) to investigate urban design and land use options for the future use of Luna Park. The Luna Park Plan of Management was prepared by the New South Wales government in 1998 to guide the future management of the Luna Park Reserve. This plan identified a preferred option for Luna Park's future use, determined in consultation with residents, the general public and other stakeholders. It sought to preserve Luna Park's amusement park character while introducing new uses to improve its viability and accordance with the parameters in the Luna Park Site Amendment Act 1997. There was also grassroots community support for the park's reopening; one example of this was the collection of a 5,000 signature petition by a pair of high school students.

In June 1997, the New South Wales government presented four development proposals to the public. After a month of public viewing and comment, a 'diverse-use' plan, encompassing rides and amusements, restaurants, cafés, and function capacity was announced as the winning plan. In February 1998, the NSW Department of Public Works and Services called for proposals to redevelop Luna Park, and 20 proposals were submitted, with eight selected for further consideration.

In July 1999, the results of the tendering process were made public. Metro Edgley Group (consisting of Metro Edgley, Multiplex Facilities Management, and a group of private investors) was awarded the tender. Their proposal intended for most of the rides to stay, but called for the Big Dipper to be replaced with a multipurpose concert venue, and asked to redevelop the Crystal Palace as a function centre.

A Master Plan for the site was prepared in 1999, which included a Heritage Report prepared by Godden Mackay Logan. Further consultation with North Sydney Council brought the development to a standstill, with the Council and the directors of Metro Edgley clashing over several aspects of the proposed redevelopment. In January 2002 the Minister for Planning approved a development application for the site. On top of this, specific applications had to be lodged for each element of the plan, each of which in turn would require community consultation. The development eventually began in 2003.

During the long decision-making and approval process, Luna Park was permitted to operate for several charity-organised events, including for Variety Club and the Spastic Centre. The park was also allowed to operate on selected weekends and school holidays in late 2000 and early 2001, under strict, court-appointed conditions. In July 2001, the Big Dipper was sold and moved to Dreamworld in Queensland.

=== 2004 to 2020: Reopening, legal action, heritage listing and further redevelopment ===
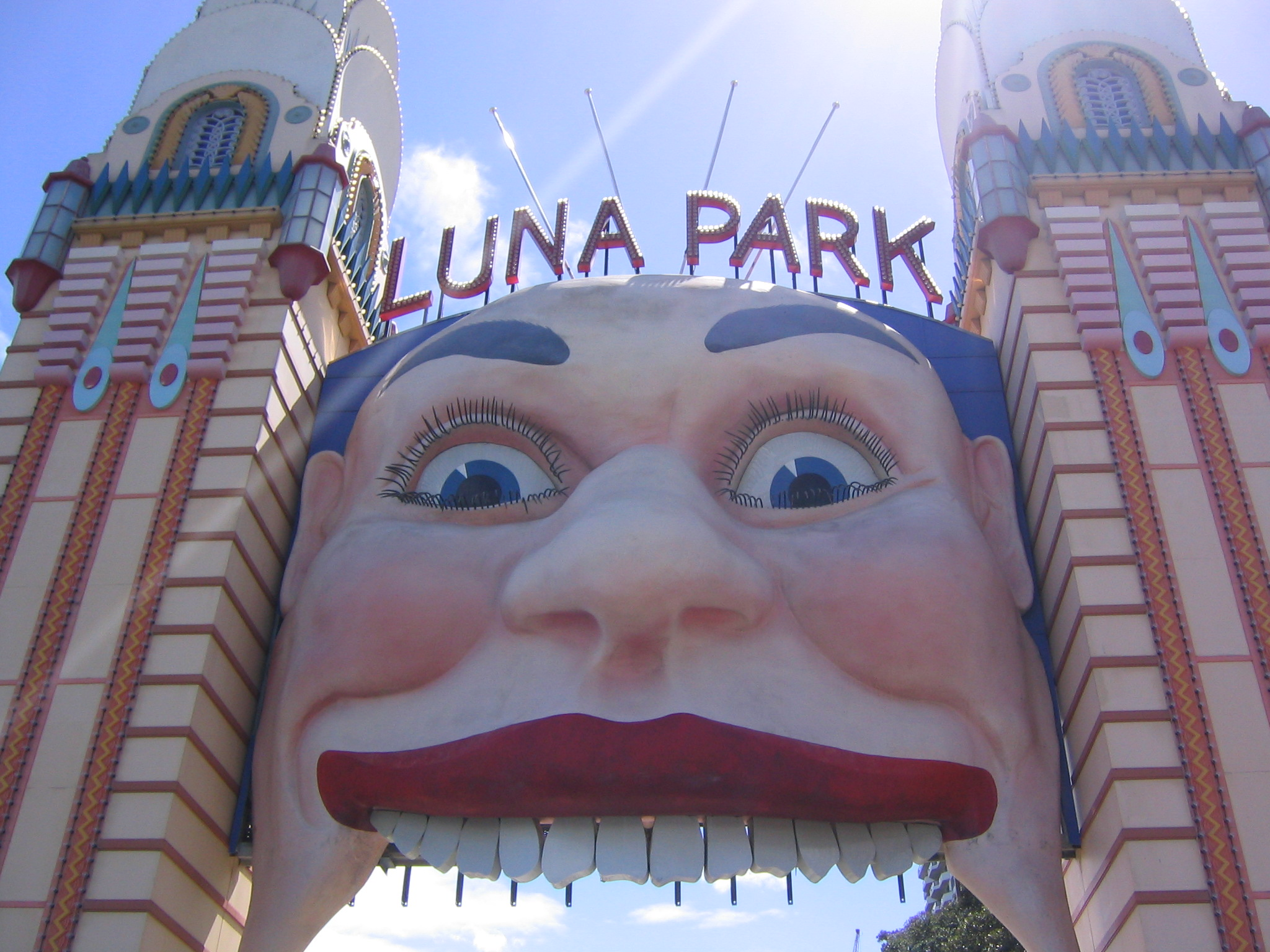
During the redevelopment, the face was raised to provide access to construction vehicles

The redevelopment and restoration of the park was conducted over a 14-month period between 2003 and 2004. The rides were removed, restored, and in some cases upgraded to comply with modern safety standards. The Crystal Palace was redesigned with several modular function rooms, the largest of which took up the entire lower floor. New additions included a 2,000 seat multipurpose auditorium, the Big Top, and a 389 space underground carpark.

On 4 April 2004, the park reopened once again and has remained open ever since. Despite rain and low temperatures, several thousand people attended the opening day, and an accumulated attendance figure of 200,000 was reached within two months.

Legal action against the park by a group of seven Milsons Point residents and one developer began again in April 2005. The claim was of noise nuisance from the amusement rides, particularly those in Maloney's Corner. The case was defeated when legislation was passed by the New South Wales government protecting Luna Park from such claims, although it was later revealed that these laws may have been influenced by court documents leaked to then-Tourism, Sport, and Recreation minister Sandra Nori by two Luna Park executives. The executives were charged with contempt of court in August 2007.

A new case began in June 2007, with the residents instead claiming breaches of the Trade Practices Act. Stating that they had been misled as to the types of amusement ride that were located in the Maloney's Corner area, the residents and developer attempted to claim over $20 million in damages, and demanded the relocation or permanent closure of the Ranger and Spider rides. The case was dismissed by the Supreme Court of New South Wales on 6 February 2009, with the supervising Justice ruling that the development applications submitted by the park had not been "misleading or deceptive", as claimed.

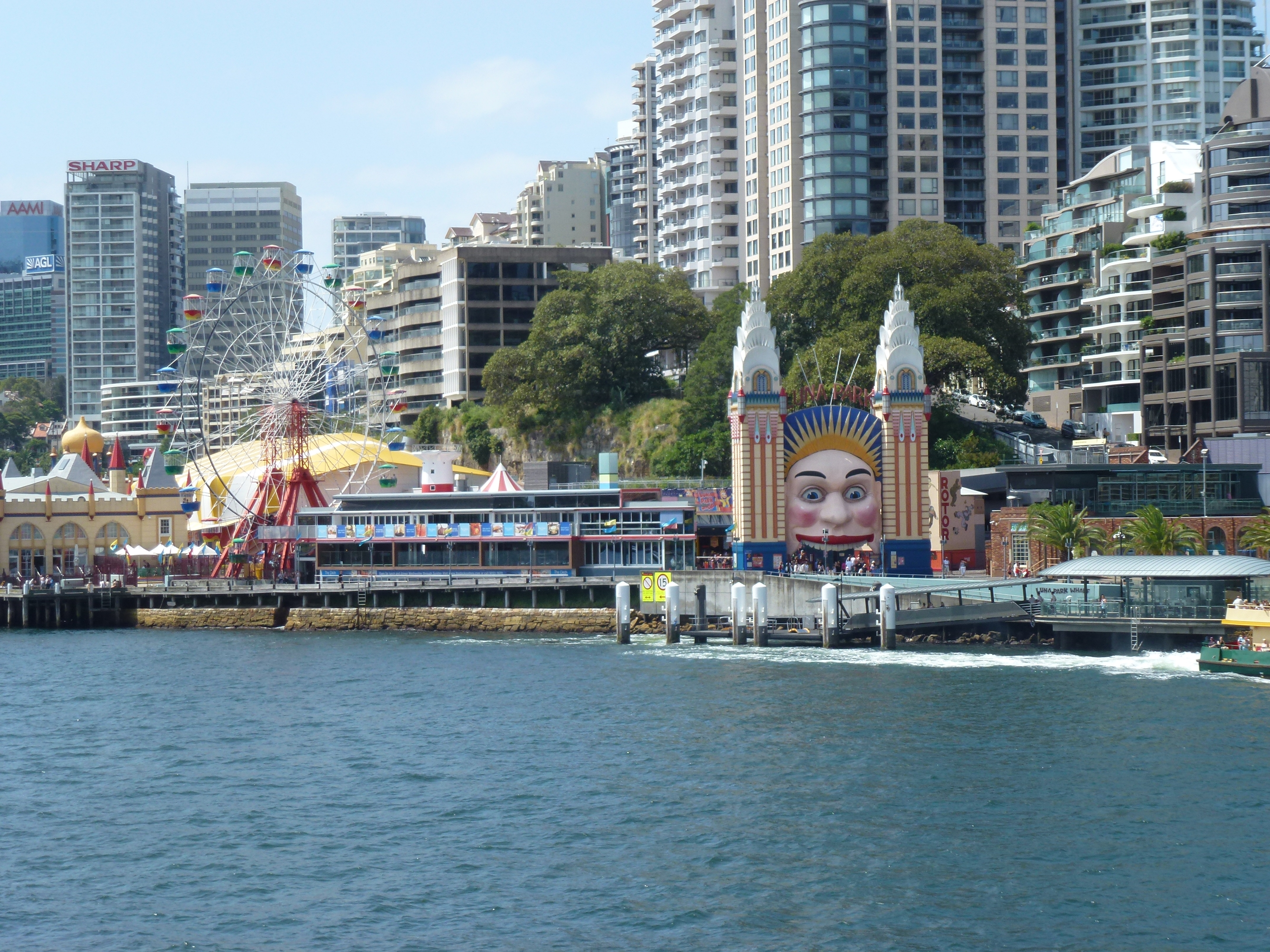
The park as seen from Sydney Harbour in 2012.

On 1 January 2007, a staff member working on the Golden Way Amusements-owned Speed (hired for the Christmas holidays) was struck in the head by the armature while the ride was in motion. The employee was taken to hospital and placed in intensive care.

In October 2007, Multiplex announced that it was intending to sell the lease to one of the undeveloped sections of Luna Park. The section of land, advertised for approximately $7 million, had initially been leased from the NSW Government for $1, on the condition that any profit made from property built on the site was invested in the amusement park. There were concerns that the money will be used to allow Multiplex to recoup the financial outlay made when redeveloping the park, instead of going towards the ongoing operation and maintenance of Luna Park's facilities.

In February 2010, the Park was placed on the NSW State Heritage Register.

In late 2011, the NSW government allocated $78,000 in the state budget for upgrades of the park's lighting to LEDs, along with repairs to the park's buildings.

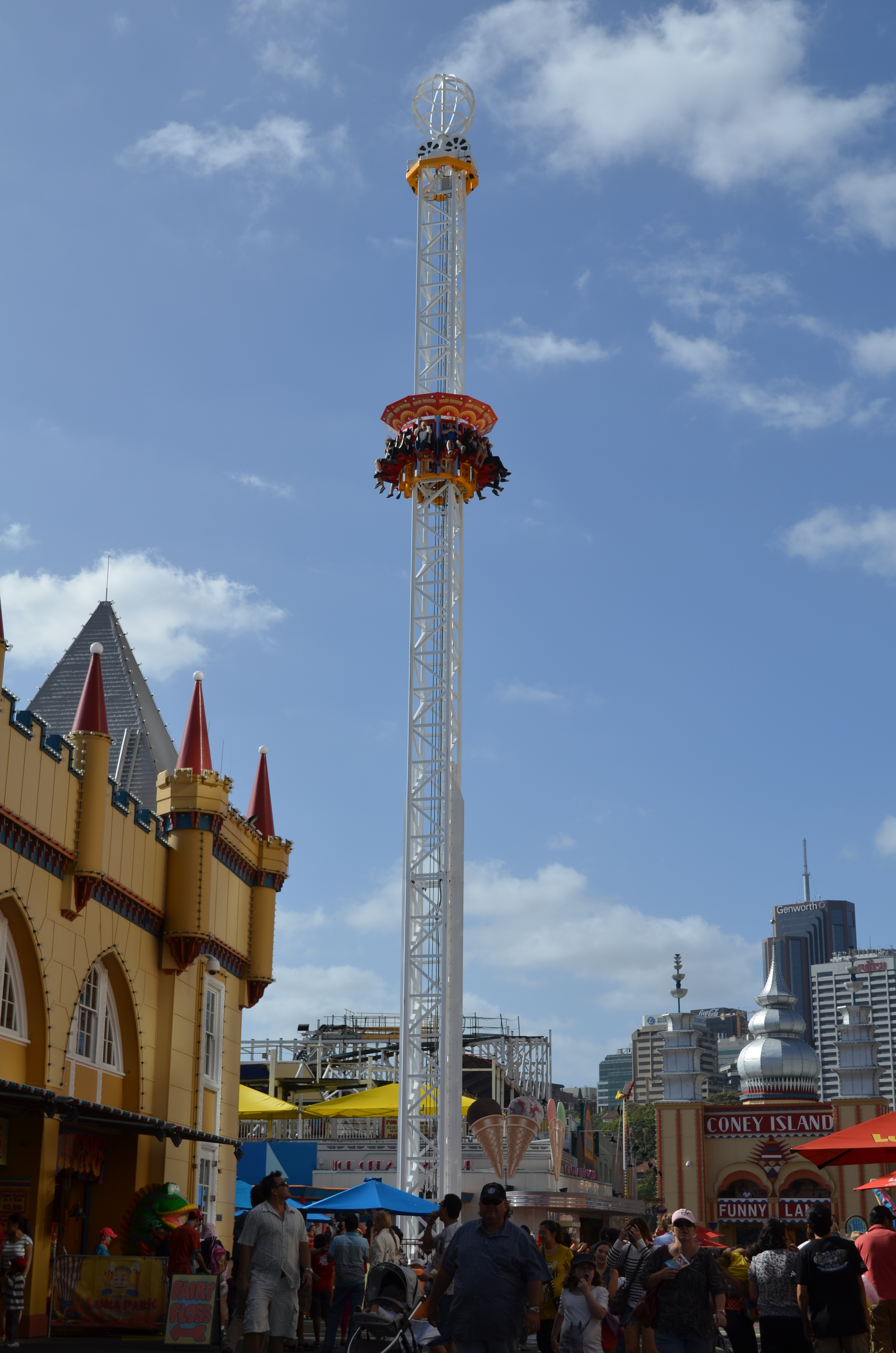
Hair Raiser in December 2013

On Boxing Day 2013, Luna Park opened Hair Raiser, a Super Shot drop tower manufactured by Larson International. The ride was constructed without proper planning approval, sparking controversy. Furthermore, there were complaints from local residents about the noise, light and visual impacts of the ride on the surrounding area. In 2015, the Department of Planning and Environment approved the operation of the ride, requiring the park take measures to reduce its visual impact. In 2016, Hair Raiser was repainted from white to blue.

In 2017, the park unsuccessfully lodged a construction certificate to install a new ride, The Flying Carousel (later known as Volaré). After taking then-planning minister Anthony Roberts to court over the rejection, judgment stated that the park now would be required to submit a development application any time a new ride of any kind was to be added. Luna Park management opposed this, as it would require the park to take into consideration objections of local residents. Public reaction and media coverage of the decision was negative, with management claiming it would be unviable to operate the park long-term under the planning restrictions. In October 2018, it was announced that the park would no longer need to submit development applications for ride installations, with new planning processes introduced. Volaré opened to the public on 24 March 2019.

=== 2020 to present: COVID-19 era ===
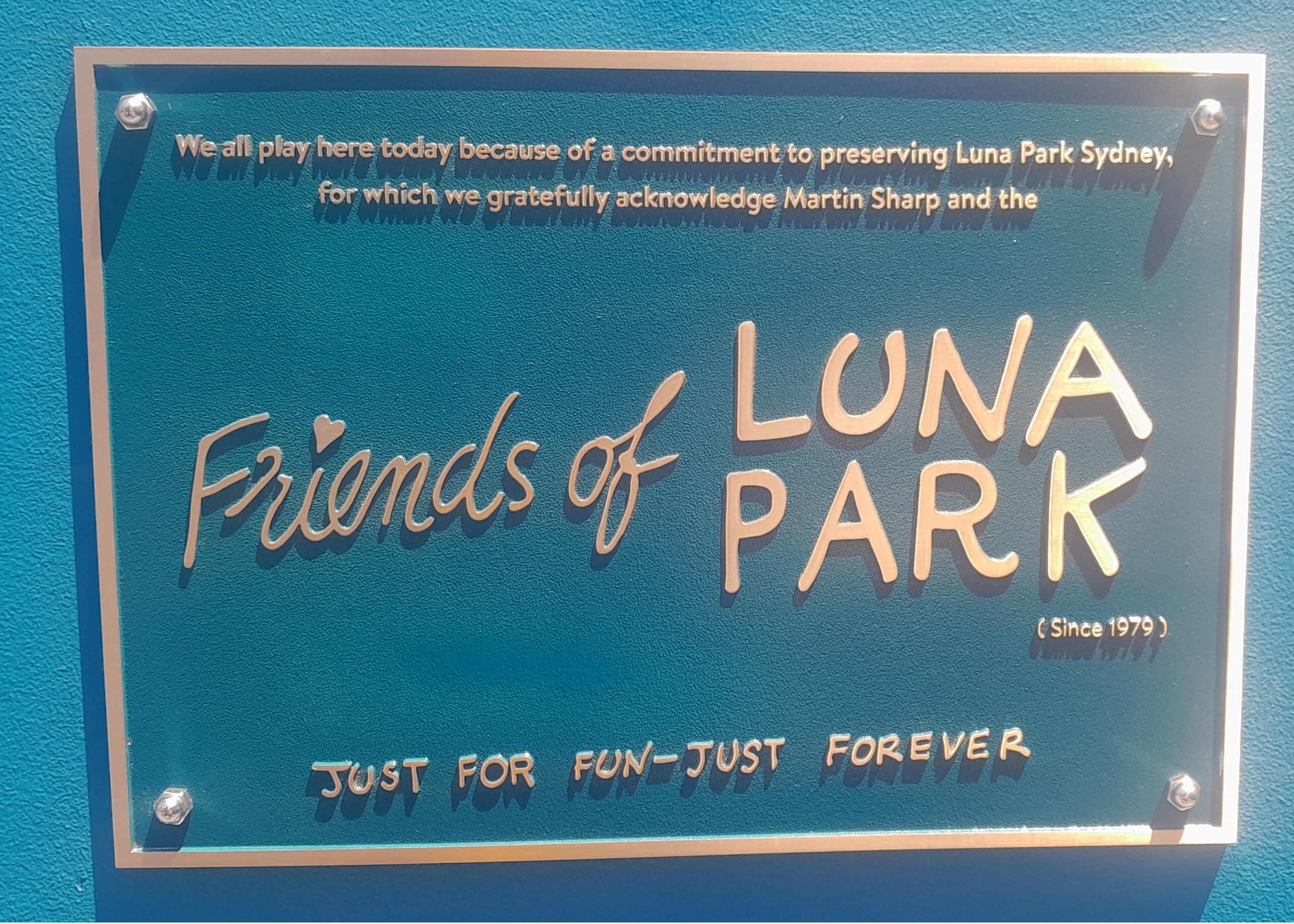
Plaque commemorating the efforts of Friends of Luna Park activists, installed in 2023.

On 19 March 2020, Luna Park confirmed that the park would be closed as a result of the COVID-19 pandemic. The park reopened on 3 July with the implementation of additional safety measures, including regular cleaning between rides, limits on the number of visitors per ride and health checks upon arrival.

The park closed again in January 2021, and nine new rides were built, including three roller coasters; one a Gerstlauer family shuttle coaster called Boomerang, and another a Preston and Barbieri mini coaster named Little Nipper. The third coaster is Big Dipper, a prototype Intamin Hot Racer, and Australia's first single-rail coaster. Eight of these rides were scheduled to open on 26 June, but this was delayed until 22 October due to the COVID pandemic and resulting lockdowns. Big Dipper opened on 26 December 2021.

In March 2023, the park held a reunion of the Friends of Luna Park activist group at Coney Island. A plaque was unveiled to commemorate their efforts, and particularly Sharp's, in saving the park from development. In June 2024 Luna Park's lease that runs until 2044, was sold by Brookfield to Oscars Group.

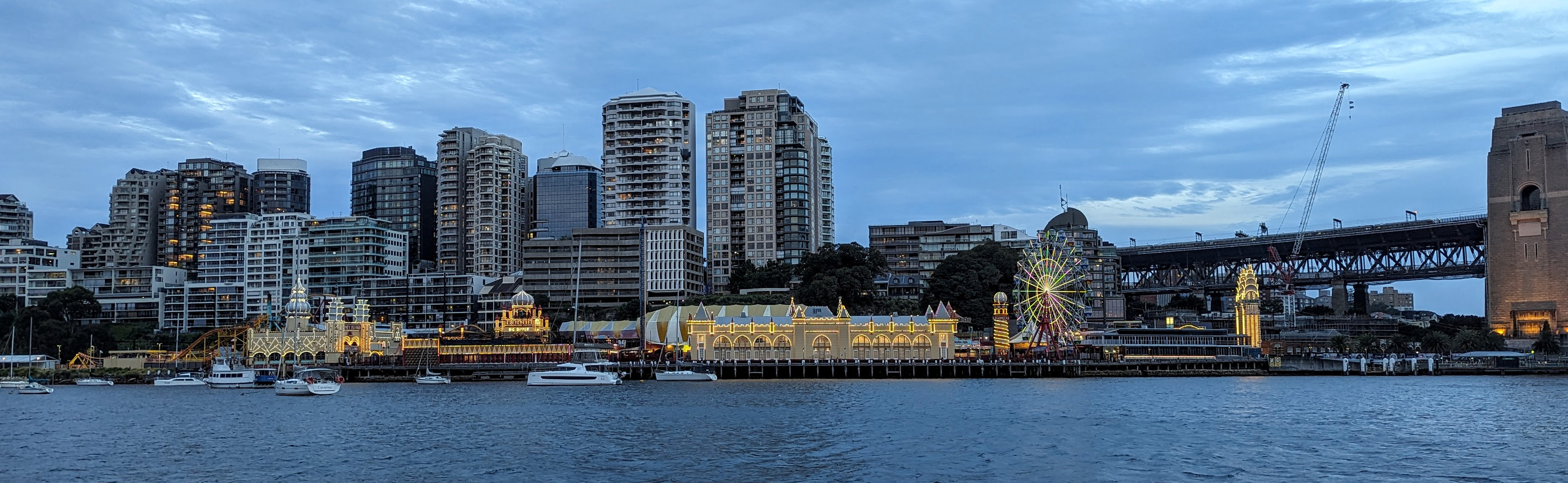
Luna Park at dusk, in February 2024, as viewed from the ferry to Milsons Point from McMahons Point

== Park layout ==
=== Park Entrance / "The Face" ===
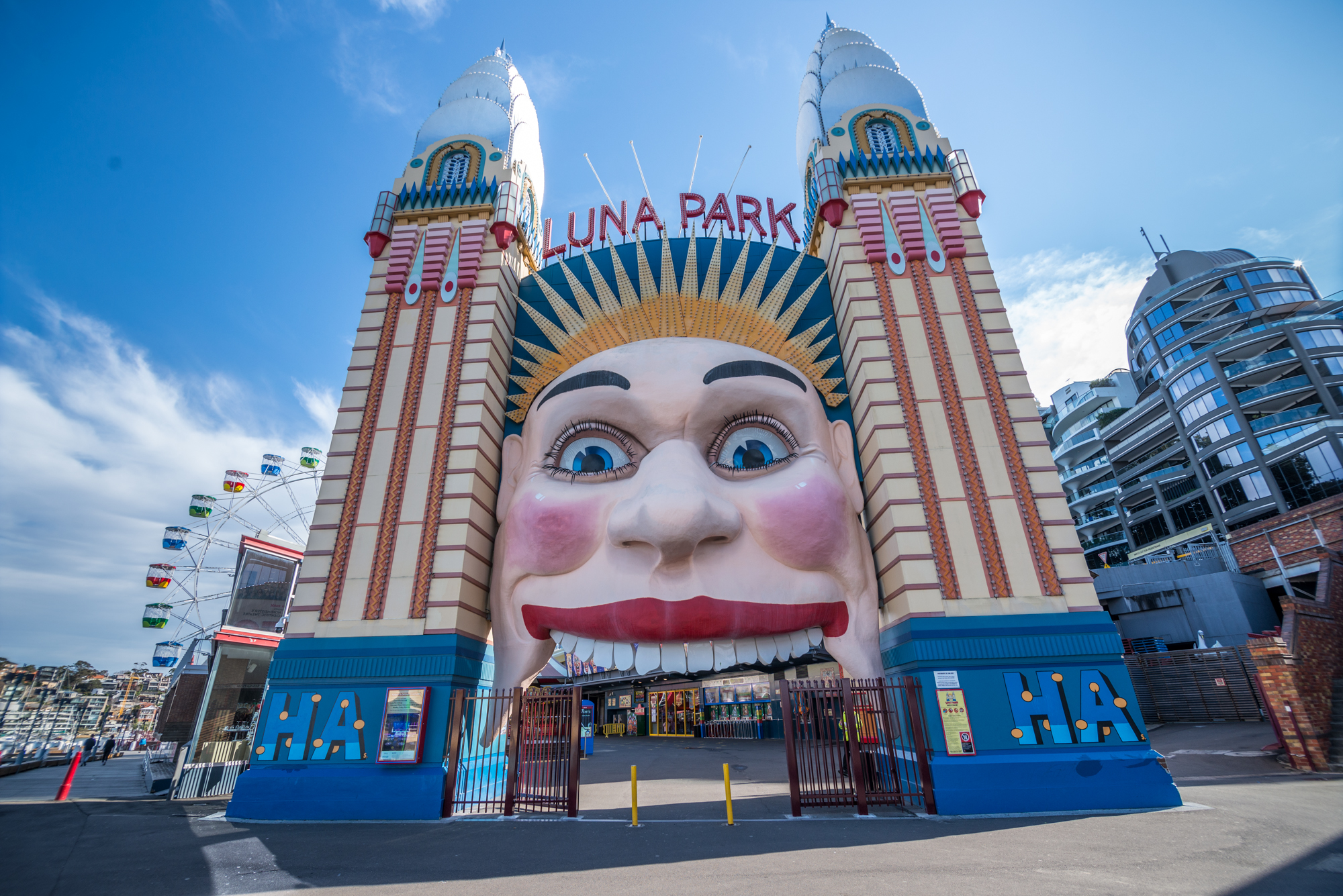
The Luna Park face in 2018

The iconic 9-metre-high (30-foot-high) face, as well as its 26-metre-high (85-foot-high) supporting towers, which are decorated in the popular 1930s Art Deco style with scalloped spires imitating the top of New York's Chrysler building, have presided over the main entrance for almost all of the park's existence. The idea was based on the entrance of Luna Park Melbourne, and Steeplechase Park's "face" mascot. The first face was created by Melbourne scenic artist, Rupert Browne for the park's opening in 1935. The face was modelled on the Man in the Moon and thus named Mr.Moon. At the time, the entire structure was lit by the largest neon lighting display in Australia. Mr.Moon's eyes were illuminated and would move back and forth.

The early faces, notwithstanding their sometimes scary appearance, were only built of chicken wire, plaster, and paint, which would deteriorate due to weather exposure. Regular maintenance work was required, which led to changes in facial expression. In 1938, the face received its first facelift, which was redesigned by Rupert Browne. In 1947, the face received another facelift after faulty neon lights caused a fire, damaging the left scalloped spire. The neon lights were then replaced with incandescent bulbs. By the late 1950s, the face began to sag and distort so badly that it became somewhat grotesque. In 1960, Arthur Barton designed the face's first "happy" appearance, inspired by the likeness of Old King Cole.

The face was then repainted in 1973, pop artist Martin Sharp covering the face with a clown-like mask. In 1979, deterioration of the structure necessitated the removal of the scalloped spires. By 1982, the face had deteriorated sufficiently for a new fibreglass face, modeled after the 1973 face, to be created. Following the park's closure in 1988, the entire structure was removed, and the 1982 face was donated to the Powerhouse Museum in May 1994.^{[1]:125}

In 1993, a new fibreglass face, inspired by Arthur Barton's 1960 design and made by Natureworks, was made and installed, and in 1995, the supporting towers were rebuilt in the style of the original 1935 design. As of February 2026, this version of the main entrance still stands.

=== Midway ===
Stretching from the Park entrance to Coney Island, the Midway has always been the main thoroughfare of Luna Park. The Midway is the focus of many activities and amusements, and provides access to the Crystal Palace, Big Top, and Coney Island, along with the majority of Luna Park's permanent rides.

=== Crystal Palace ===
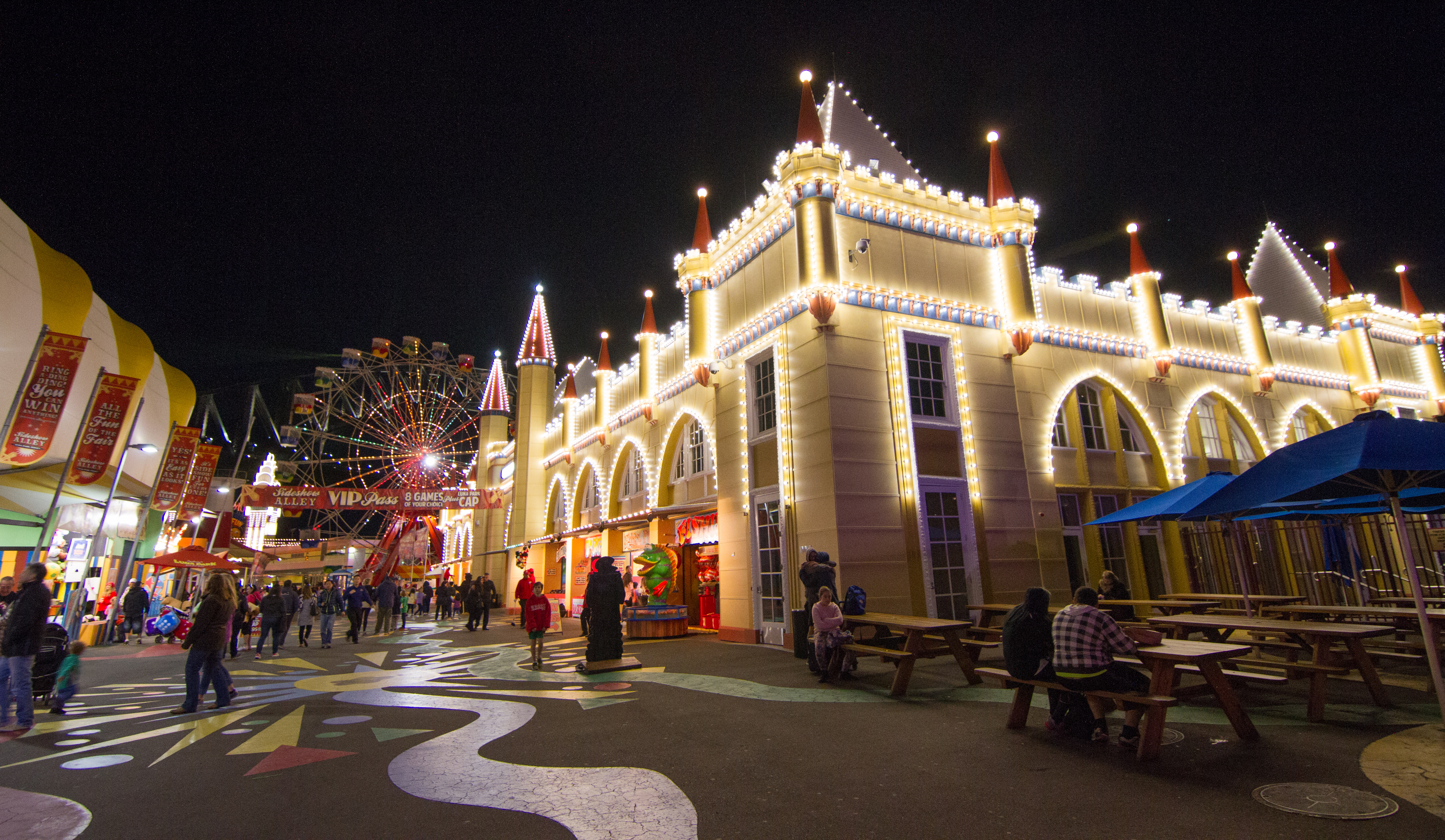
Exterior of the Crystal Palace at night

Beginning life in 1935 as a dodgem hall and office space, the Crystal Palace has seen many uses over the park's history, including as a dance hall, a BMX track, a games arcade, and a restaurant and bar. The essential form of the Crystal Palace is that of a large rectangular thirteen-bay steel-framed structure, two storeys in height with a hip roof behind extended walls. The end bays are framed with heavy Oregon members and the roof ends above them are gabled hips with louvered ventilation in the gables. The exteriors were originally symmetrical, the two long elevations having emphatic central elements and end pavilions. Parapets conceal the main roof; these are crenulated except for the tower motifs where chamfered blocks of timber, imitating machicolation, have been planted on. The cladding, once predominantly asbestos cement, has been replaced in the early 1990s works with fibre-cement. The centre of the east or Midway entrance elevation has a steep hipped roof between tall pinnacles, while the four "towers" of the end pavilions have steep pyramid roofs.

Since the 2004 reopening, Crystal Palace has been host to four of the seven rooms used by Luna Park's functions business. The main room stretches across the entire lower floor of Crystal Palace, and is often used for wedding receptions and other large social functions. The Midway-facing exterior of the building is host to numerous sideshow games and food stalls.

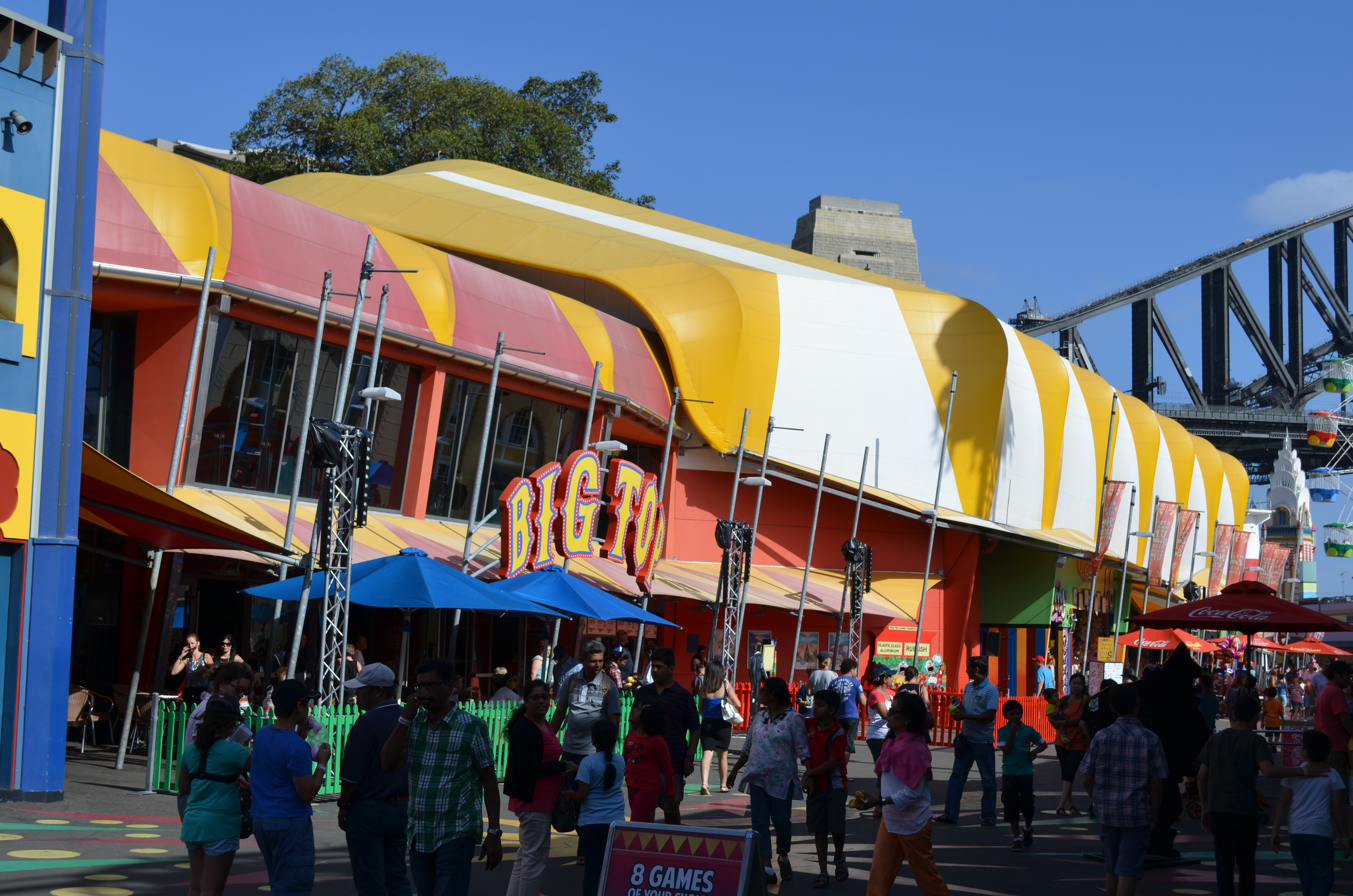
The Big Top

=== Big Top ===
Constructed during the 2003 redevelopment on the site of the Big Dipper, the Big Top is a fully licensed, multi-purpose venue capable of seating 2,000 people (this capacity can increase to 3,000 for standing-only concerts). The modular design of the stage and seating allows the entire venue to be easily reconfigured for different event types, and the concrete building is heavily soundproofed to cut down on noise pollution. Examples of events run in the Big Top include concerts (including shows from Kylie Minogue's Anti Tour and the annual Come Together Music Festival), award shows and presentations (like the inaugural MTV Australia Video Music Awards or the live finals for the 2005–2008 seasons of Australia's Next Top Model), sporting tournaments (like the Australia Mixed Martial Arts Cage Fighting Championship and the 2013 Sydney Darts Masters), trade shows, and other large events.

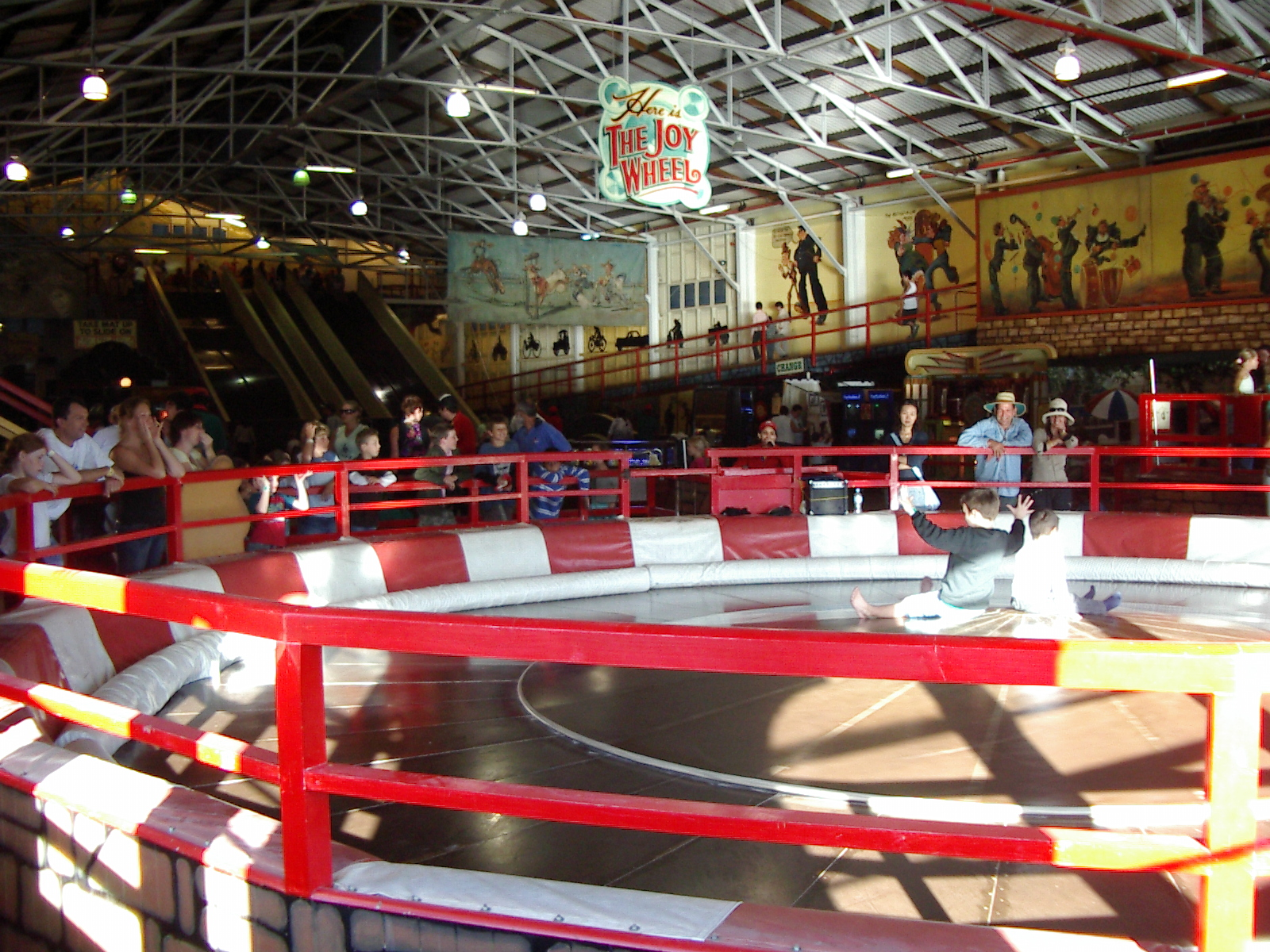
Joy wheel inside Coney Island

=== Coney Island ===
First constructed in 1935, Coney Island (also known as Funnyland) is the only operating example of a 1930s funhouse left in the world. Although some changes have been made over the years, the layout is almost identical to when Luna Park opened in 1935. It is a rectangular building with the longest side running east–west. It has a corrugated iron hip roof with its external walls forming parapet walls around each side. The basic structure of Coney Island is virtually identical to that of the Crystal Palace. It is similar in width but slightly shorter, having twelve bays. Internally the steelwork of the main structure is concealed by mural panels or decorated motifs which were physically conserved during 1994. The roof purlins and sheeting are exposed. Industrial light fittings are suspended from the roof. .

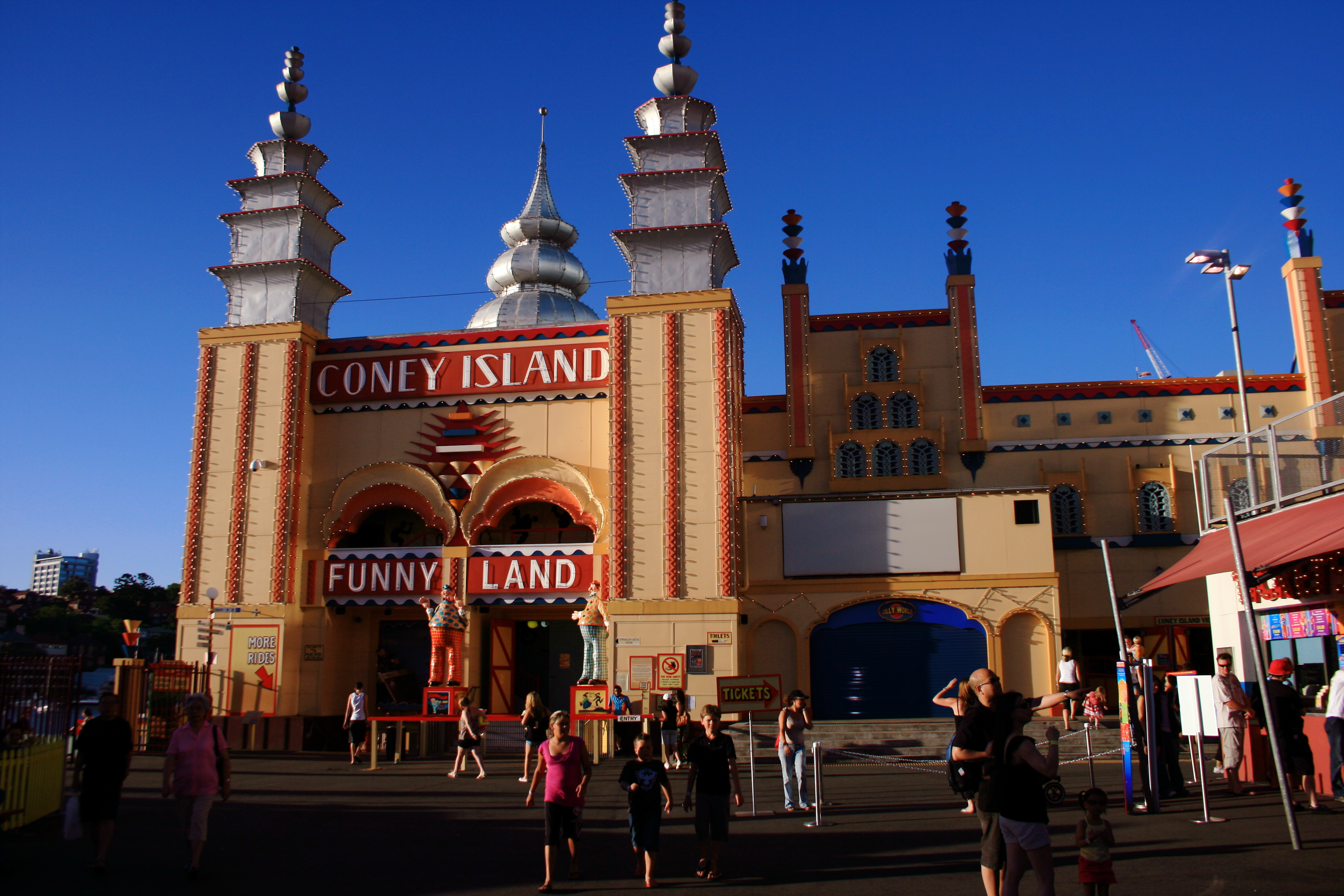
Exterior of Coney Island

The open space contains large and small attractions, including four sets of giant slides, a joy wheel, revolving barrels, moving walkways and obstacle courses. The design was based on funhouses in Europe and the United States. Today's Coney Island is also host to the restored artworks of Arthur Barton, Luna Park's original resident artist, along with photographs and memorabilia spanning Luna Park's history. The amusements were saved from demolition in 1981 by the 'Friends of Luna Park' action group, who purchased them for $9,200, on the condition that they remain in the heritage-listed building.

=== Luna Land ===
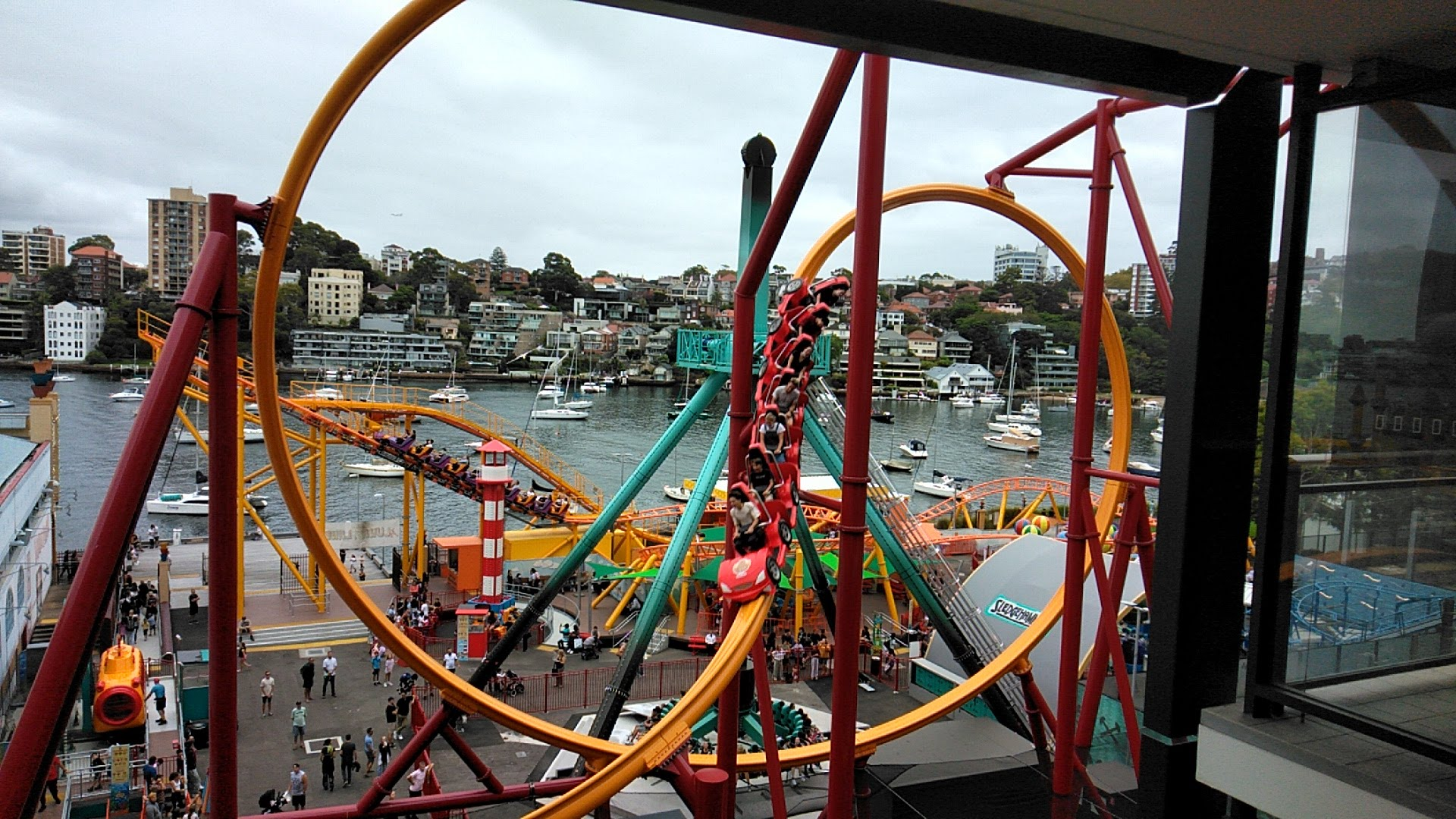
Big Dipper and Luna Land

Luna Land was originally named 'Maloney's Corner' after Tony Maloney, a long-time Luna Park employee who started at 13 years of age. Maloney's Corner was built on land purchased from the New South Wales government and the State Rail Authority during the 1994 development, so that supports for the Big Dipper could be built, and a park, including a Ghost Train fire memorial. During the 2003 redevelopment, this area was paved over so the Ranger, Spider and various children's rides could be relocated here from the Midway, to provide room for other developments. In late October 2020, the Spider and the Moon Ranger were removed. In November 2020, it was announced that the whole area would be cleared to make a new land called "Luna Land" with nine brand new rides, including three roller coasters and a thrill flat ride, with the rest being children's rides. The Park closed on 26 January 2021 and reopened on 22 October of that year with eight of the nine new rides (Boomerang, Bug, Cloud 9, Freaky Frogs, Little Nipper, Loopy Lighthouse, Sledgehammer, and Silly Sub) open to the public; the ninth and final new ride (Big Dipper) would become available a couple of months later on 26 December of that year.

== Rides ==
=== Current rides ===
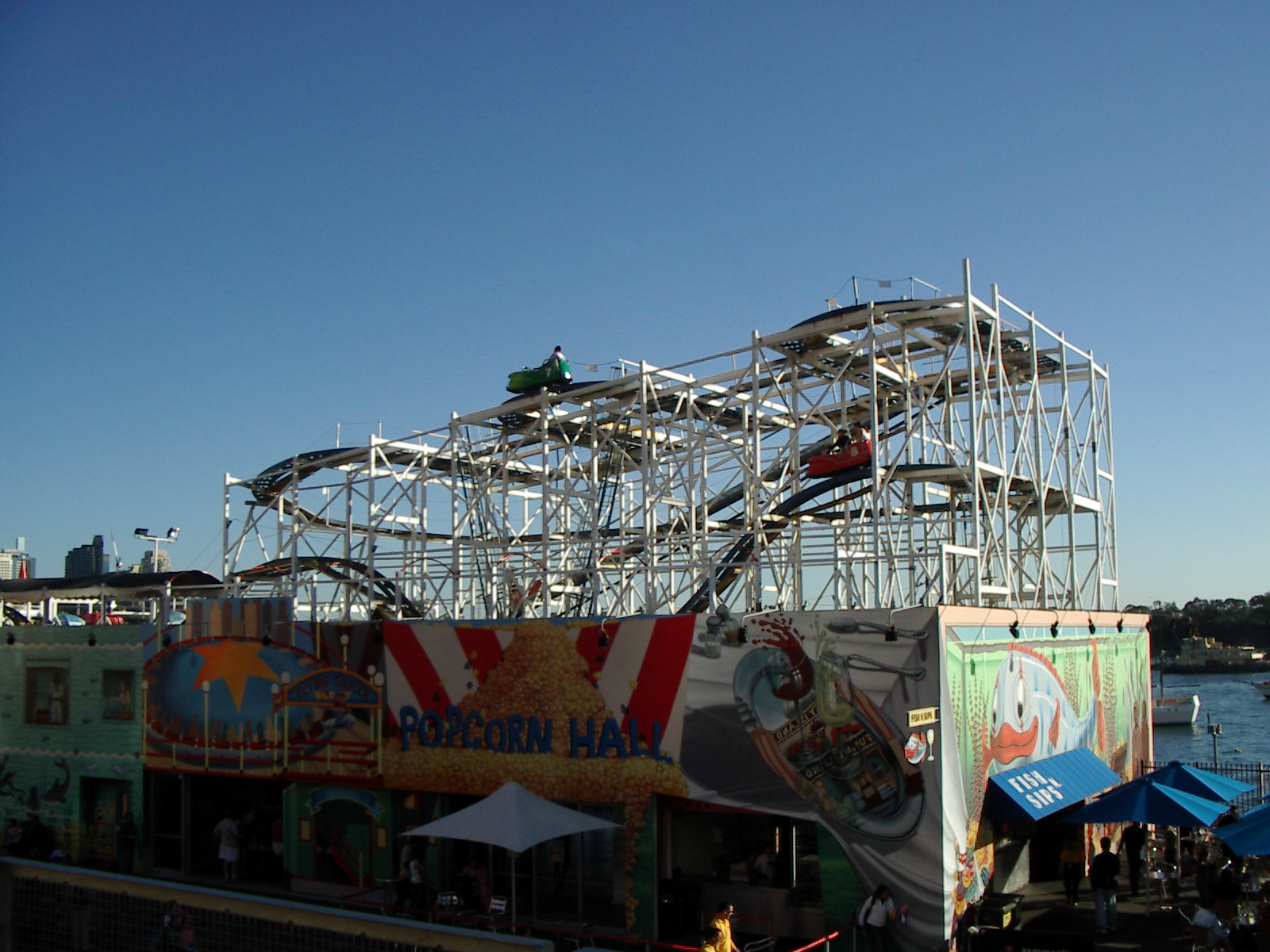
The Wild Mouse roller coaster

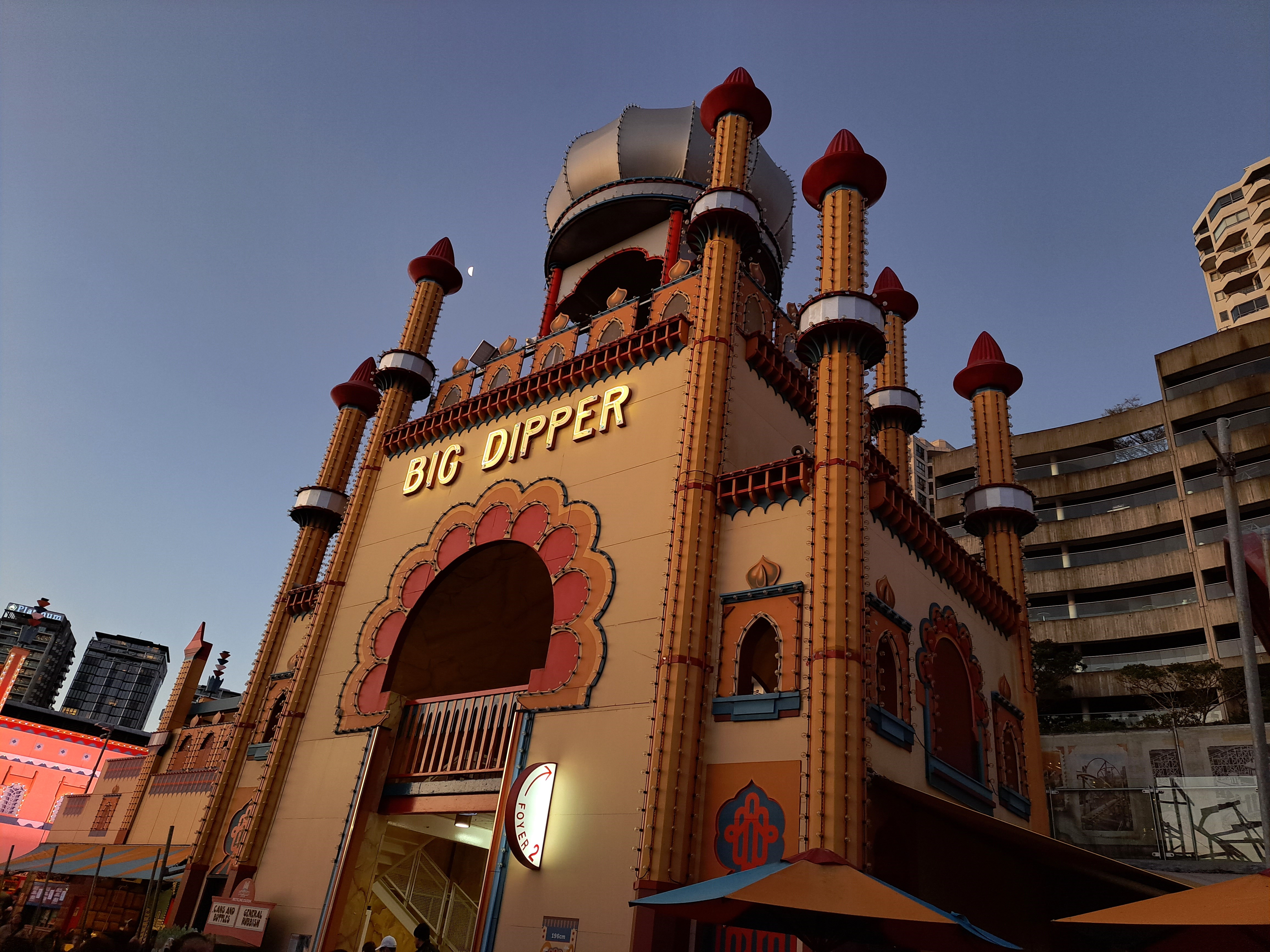
Big Dipper's entrance. The structure was built in 1994, reminiscent of the original Big Dipper's station.

This is a list of all permanent rides in operation at Luna Park, arranged alphabetically, as of October 2026:

- Big Dipper (2021) – An Intamin Hot Racer that opened on 26 December 2021. The ride is the world's first launched single-rail coaster, and the first single-rail coaster in Australia. It features two launches, with the first accelerating riders to 50 km/h and the second to 72 km/h, making it the world's first double-launch single-rail roller coaster. The ride also features two inversions: a non-inverting loop and a sidewinder.
- Boomerang – A Gerstlauer family shuttle coaster. The layout is a mirrored and slightly modified clone of Rewind Racers.
- Bug – A Zamperla mini Ferris Wheel.
- Carousel – A carousel by John H. Rundle Ltd.
- Cloud Nine – A Zamperla Samba balloon.
- Coney Island – A funhouse containing numerous classic attractions. Coney Island is the last surviving opening-day attraction at Luna Park.
  - Devil's Drop – A taller and steeper set of slides, which was installed in 1938.
  - Joy Wheel – A wooden joy wheel.
  - Mirror Maze – A mirror maze which was installed in 2008, located under the slides.
  - Slides – Three sets of large wooden slides.
  - Turkey Trot – An undulating moving walkway.
  - Wonky Walk – An obstacle course.
- Dodgem City – A nineteen car dodgem hall. Dodgem City was originally located underneath Wild Mouse from 1995, before being moved to its current location underneath Big Dipper in 2004.
- Ferris Wheel – A 35 metre tall, 24 gondola Ferris wheel. Introduced to the park during the 1982 Harbourside development.
- Freaky Frogs – A Zamperla Jump Around.
- Hair Raiser – A 50-metre (160 ft) Larson International Super Shot drop tower added to the park in 2013.
- Little Nipper – A Preston & Barbieri mini coaster.
- Loopy Lighthouse – A Zamperla Jumping Tower
- Rotor – Luna Park's Rotor was first installed in 1951. It was continually a popular ride until its demolition at the end of 1986. A slightly smaller Rotor was constructed during the 1995 redevelopment.
- Silly Sub – A Zamperla Crazy Bus.
- Sledgehammer – A Zamperla Discovery 360, first opened in October 2021.The ride operates in two cycles, with one reaching a maximum rotation of 360 degrees and the other rotating up to 240 degrees.
- Tango Train (2016) – Opened in 2016 on the site of the original Tango Train. A 20-Car Musik Express manufactured by SBF Visa.The ride features two cycles: the slower Mild Tango and the faster Wild Tango. Both cycles rotate forwards and backwards, with the forward rotation being faster.
- Volaré – A Preston & Barbieri Wave Swinger, opening in 2019.
- Wild Mouse – A wooden Wild Mouse roller coaster, Luna Park's Wild Mouse first opened in 1963, and although it has been disassembled and removed on several occasions, it has remained at Luna Park since 1995. It is one of only three wooden Wild Mouse roller coasters left in the world. In August 2022, the ride closed to receive an extensive rebuild and restoration, reopening in March 2025.

=== Previous rides of note ===
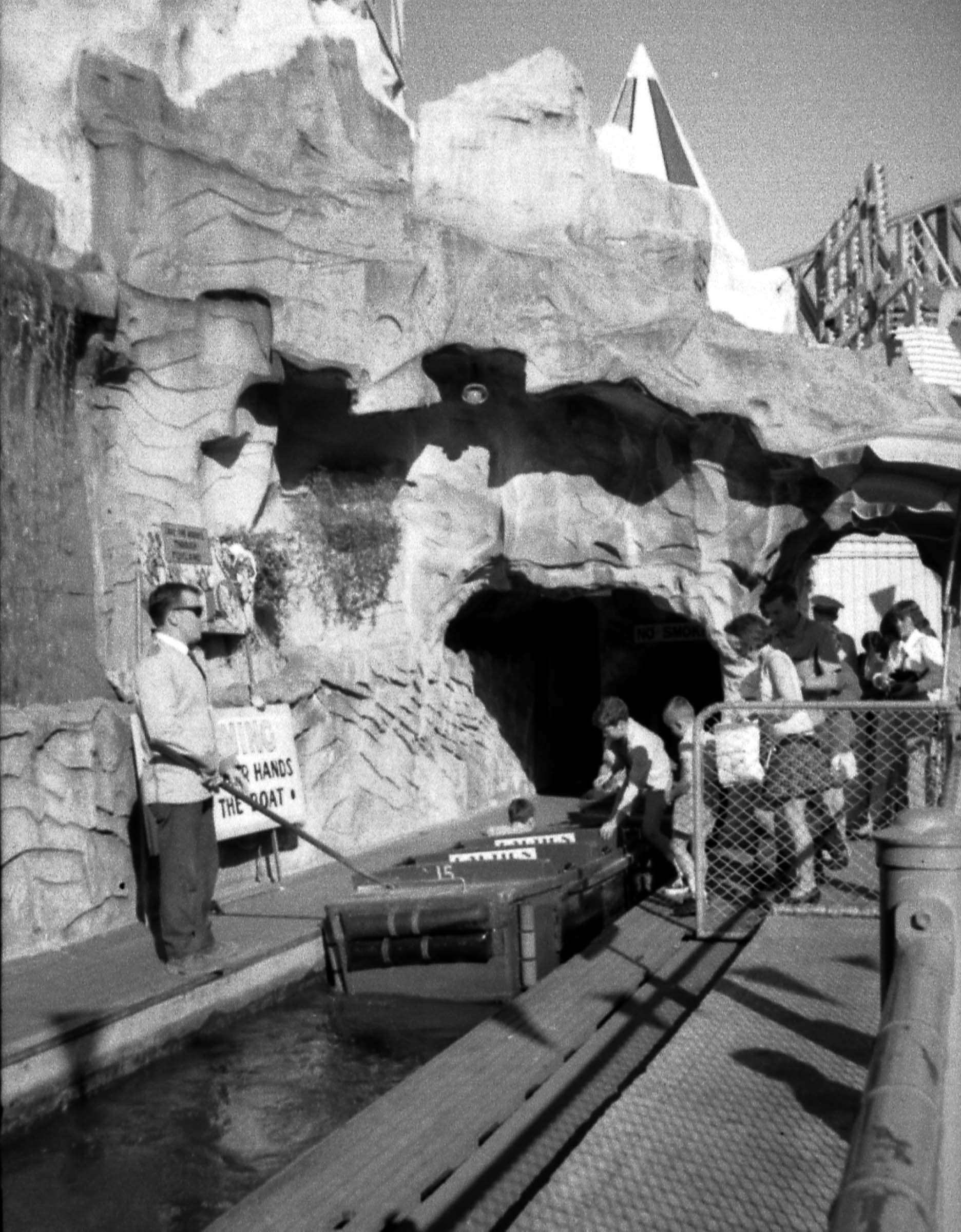
Riders board the River Caves in 1969

- Big Dipper (1935) – A wooden roller coaster constructed in 1930 for Luna Park Glenelg, a clone of Luna Park Melbourne's ride of the same name. Operated at the Milsons Point site from 1935 to 1979, when it was demolished and burned in 1981 following the park's closure as a result of the Ghost Train fire.
- Ghost Train – A ghost train operating at Luna Park from 1935 until it burned down in mysterious circumstances on 9 June 1979. Seven people were killed in the fire.
- River Caves – An Old Mill style dark ride, which was demolished in 1981.
- Big Dipper (1995) – A large custom looping coaster designed by Arrow Dynamics and opened in January 1995. Noise pollution complaints by a resident action group focused primarily on the Big Dipper, putting heavy restrictions on its operation. The resulting loss of revenue was partially responsible for the park's 1996 closure. In 2001 the ride was relocated to Dreamworld, where it's currently known as The Gold Coaster.
- Geronimo – A Schwarzkopf Jet Star 2 that ran from 1982 to 1988.
- Tango Train (1995) – A Music Express was closed on 25 April 2016 to be replaced with another Music Express of the same name. The Tango Train was dismantled and sold for parts.
- Flying Saucer – A 1988 HUSS UFO which arrived at Luna Park in 1995. Was closed in 2013 and replaced by Volaré in 2019.
- Moon Ranger – A HUSS Ranger coming to the park in 1995. Was closed and removed in 2020.
- Tumblebug – A 1988 HUSS Troika, the Tumblebug was installed in 1995. The ride, named after the Tumble Bug operated by Luna Park from 1935 to 1973, was closed and removed in 2020.
- Spider – A HUSS Breakdance installed during the 1995 redevelopment, the Spider received its name from the park's 1938 ride. This was the last of the four HUSS rides that came to the park in 1995 remaining when it was closed and removed in late November 2020.
- Octopus – An Octopus ride that opened in 1995 and was removed in 2001.

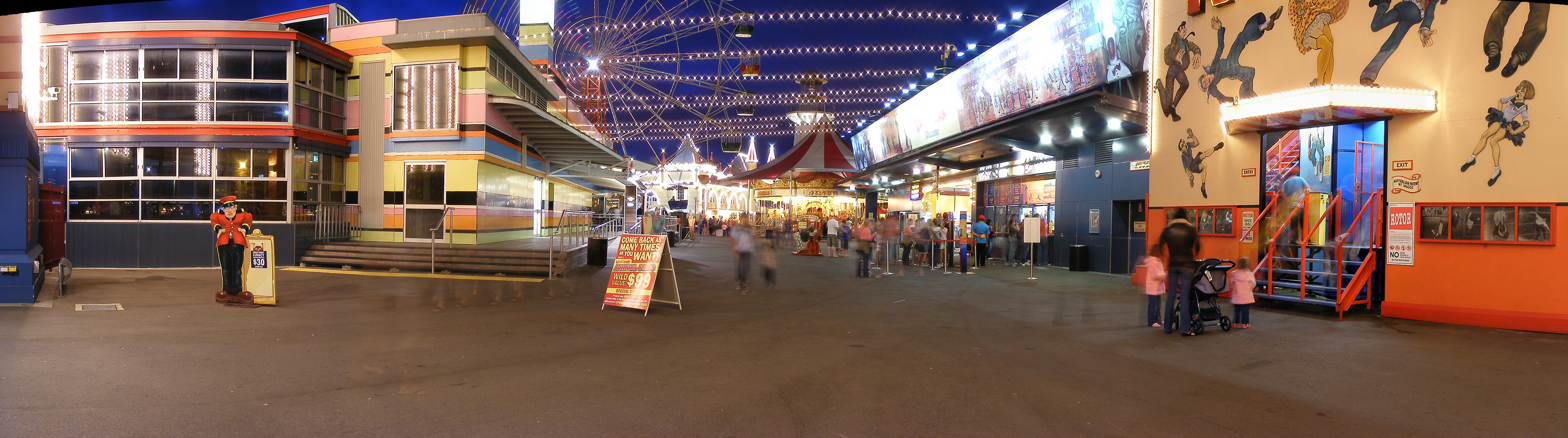
Beyond the entrance to Luna Park Sydney

== Height Requirements ==
Luna Park Sydney uses a colour-coded wristband system to indicate guests' height categories for ride access. The system consists of three categories: Yellow (132 cm and above), Green (106–132 cm) and Red (85–106 cm).

Guests who purchase an unlimited rides pass online or in person receive a wristband upon arrival at the park. Guests are height-checked to determine the appropriate wristband category.

Special event wristbands and Coney Island passes are exceptions to the standard colour-coded system, with guests' heights checked at individual rides. Regardless of wristband colour, ride operators may conduct additional height checks using measuring boards stationed at each attraction to ensure guests meet the ride's height requirements.

=== Yellow (132 cm and above) ===
Yellow riders can access all rides and attractions freely unless subject to any additional ride-specific restrictions. The following rides have a minimum height requirement of 132 cm:

- Big Dipper
- Sledgehammer
- Hair Raiser
- Devils Drop Giant Slide (Coney Island)

=== Green (106–132 cm) ===
Green riders can access the following rides if accompanied by a ticket holding adult aged 18 or older:

- Wild Mouse
- Boomerang
- Little Nipper
- Volaré
- Tango Train ("Mild" cycle only)
- Dodgem City
- Mirror Maze (Coney Island)
- Ferris Wheel

Green riders can also access the following rides alone:

- Carousel
- Cloud 9
- Freaky Frogs
- Silly Sub
- Bug
- Rotor
- Loopy Lighthouse
- Barrels of Fun (Coney Island)
- Joy Wheel (Coney Island)
- Turkey Trot (Coney Island)
- Wonky Walk (Coney Island)
- Small Slides, Bumps and Straight (Coney Island)

=== Red (85–106 cm) ===
Red riders can access the following rides only when accompanied by a ticket holding adult aged 18 or over:

- Ferris Wheel
- Carousel
- Cloud 9
- Freaky Frogs
- Silly Sub
- Bug
- Dodgem City
- Mirror Maze (Coney Island)
- Wonky Walk (Coney Island)
- Small Slides, Bumps and Straight (Coney Island)

=== Children aged two years and under ===
Children aged two years and under who are shorter than 85 cm receive free admission when accompanied by a fully paying adult aged 18 or over with a yellow wristband. They can access the following attractions:

- Ferris Wheel
- Carousel (chariot cars only)
- Coney Island (entry permitted; children cannot ride any attractions)

== Opening Hours ==
=== History ===
Historically, Luna Park Sydney operated seasonally, generally opening from October to May, with a closure during the winter months for maintenance. During the operating season, the Park primarily opened on weekends, with operating days typically running from Friday to Monday. Sessions included daytime matinees aimed at families and evening sessions targeted at adults. Additional opening days and full-week operation occurred during special events, the summer season and, at times, school holidays.

From 1972 onwards, the Park moved to year-round operation, although weekends remained the main operating days outside the summer season and school holidays.

During the 1990s, operating hours were significantly reduced following complaints from nearby residents about noise. The Big Dipper roller coaster was restricted to operating from 5:30 pm to 10 pm on Fridays and from 10 am to 11 pm on Saturdays.

=== Current operation ===
As of October 2026, Luna Park Sydney operates on varying days and hours throughout the week, depending on the season, maintenance requirements, school holidays and private events. Regular operating hours generally extend until 8 pm on Fridays and Saturdays, reflecting the Park's historical noise restrictions.

- During regular operating weeks, the Park offers full ride operation on the following days and times:
- Thursday: 10 am–2 pm
- Friday: 10 am–8 pm
- Saturday: 10 am–8 pm
- Sunday: 10 am–6 pm

The Park also closes to the general public on some Thursdays for school-exclusive days and private events.

During NSW school holidays, the Park generally operates until 6 pm from Monday to Thursday and on Sundays, while Friday and Saturday hours generally remain until 8 pm, with exceptions and extensions for Halloscream and New Year's Eve. The Park also operates during the summer period from December to January.

Visitors are advised to check the Park's official website for the schedule applicable to their visit.

=== Luna Lite Days ===
Luna Lite Days operate on selected weekdays, generally from Monday to Wednesday between 10 am and 2 pm. These sessions provide a reduced offering for visitors, with a limited selection of rides and facilities available.

The ride selection may include the Carousel or Ferris Wheel alongside a thrill ride such as Volaré or Tango Train. One food outlet and the gift shop may also be open, and two ride passes can be purchased during these sessions. The available rides and facilities vary by date, and Luna Lite Days may not operate during maintenance periods or other scheduled closures.

== In media ==
=== Film ===
- In 1959, the entire park was used for Leslie Norman's film adaptation of Summer of the Seventeenth Doll, based on the play by Ray Lawler.
- In 2000, scenes for Our Lips Are Sealed, starring Mary-Kate and Ashley Olsen, were filmed at the park after its 1995 closure.
- In 2001, scenes for the Bollywood film Dil Chahta Hai were shot at the park.
- In 2006, scenes for Candy were filmed in the park after its 2004 reopening.
- In 2018, the closing scenes of the Australian film Chocolate Oyster were filmed at the park.

=== Television ===
- Luna Park was used as a filming location by the ABC pop music series Six O'Clock Rock, which ran from 1959 to 1962.
- In 1969, the 38th episode of the 2nd season of Skippy the Bush Kangaroo was filmed at the park. The episode, simply entitled "Luna Park", was based on the premise that Skippy had won a trip to the park in a newspaper competition.
- In 1976, television soap opera Number 96 had characters Dorrie and Herbert Evans, Flo Patterson and Junior Winthrop (Pat McDonald, Ron Shand, Bunney Brooke and Curt Jansen) visit the park, including scenes of them in Coney Island, eating fairy floss, and riding on the Big Dipper and the Topsy-Turvy House. This footage, from Episode 920, has been preserved digitally and was featured in Number 96: And They Said It Wouldn't Last, a bonus feature on the 2006 DVD release of the feature film version of the show, Number 96: 2 Disc Collectors Edition.
- In 1977, the park was featured in the telemovie Gone to Ground.
- In 1983, the park was featured in the ABC TV movie The Girl from Moonooloo.
- In 1989, the park was featured in the New Zealand children's drama/adventure programme Betty's Bunch.
- In 2000, scenes for the two-part 100th episode of JAG, entitled "Boomerang", were filmed at the park.
- In 2001, the "memory sequences" in the Farscape episode "Infinite Possibilities Part I: Daedalus Demands" were shot at the park.
- In 2010, Luna Park was featured in the first season of the Australian TV series Dance Academy.
- In 2019, the auditions for season 9 of Australia's Got Talent were filmed in the Big Top, with the judges being seen on the rides at the beginnings of some episodes.
- In 2019, scenes for a Season 2 episode of the Australian crime drama Mr Inbetween were filmed at the park.

=== Documentaries ===
- In 1996, a documentary about the park entitled Spirits of the Carnival – The Quest for Fun was released.
- In 1979, Martin Sharp brought Tiny Tim to Luna Park to set a new record for the world's longest professional non-stop singing marathon. Tiny performed for two hours and seventeen minutes. Footage of the complete show was released as The Non-Stop Luna Park Marathon by Planet Blue Pictures in 2014. As of 2023, it can be viewed for free on Vimeo.
- Footage of the above marathon was originally intended for Street of Dreams, a feature film directed by Sharp that investigated the Ghost Train fire and the history of the park in general, as well as telling Tiny's life story and showcasing his eccentric personality. The film was never completed in Sharp's lifetime, but a leaked rough cut exists on the internet.
- In March 2021, a 3 part documentary aired on ABC TV and ABC iview called EXPOSED: The Ghost Train Fire which investigated the cause of the fire, interviewing many witnesses and drawing posthumously on Sharp's extensive research into the topic.

=== Music and music videos ===
- In 1983, Luna Park was mentioned in the song "Upstairs In My House" by the Australian band Men at Work on their 1983 album Cargo.
- In 2016, the park was featured in Seventeen's "Healing" music video which was released on 16 October 2016. It was filmed during their Shining Diamonds: Asia Pacific Tour.
- In 2018, Lady Leshurr filmed her music video for "On My Way" at the park.
- In 2020, Sydney post-punk band Johnny Hunter filmed their music video for "Innocence Interrupted" at the park.

=== Video games ===
- In 2022, the video game Newfound Courage's expansion Return to Otherwhere featured a theme park inspired heavily by Sydney's Luna Park, including several of the rides which players are required to use.

== See also ==
- Big Dipper (Luna Park Sydney)
