= Luna Park Glenelg =

Australian amusement park

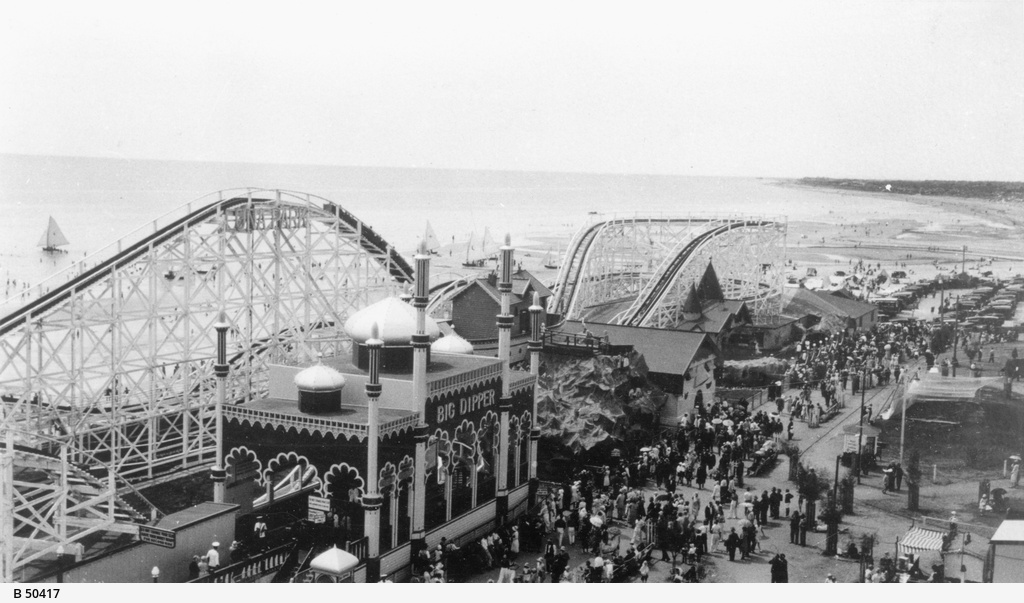
- Interactive map of Luna Park Glenelg
- Location: Glenelg, South Australia, Australia
- Coordinates: 34.9792°S 138.511°E
- Opened: 8 October 1930
- Closed: 1935
- Slogan: Just For Fun

Attractions
- Roller coasters: Big Dipper

Luna Park Glenelg was an amusement park that operated at Glenelg, South Australia from 1930 until 1935. Plans for an amusement park at the seaside town were first raised in 1928, but not acted upon. In 1929, a lease to build a scenic railway at Colley Reserve was granted by the Glenelg Town Council. This lease was expanded in 1930 to include other rides and attractions (similar to Luna Park Melbourne), and Luna Park Glenelg opened on 8 October 1930.

During the park's operation, there was tension between the park's owners and the council, with the owners complaining that they were not making enough to be profitable, and the council refusing to reduce rent or allow increased operating hours. Residents of the town also felt the amusement park was attracting undesirables. The owners began seeking alternate locations, placed the park into voluntary liquidation in late 1934, then purchased the company's assets at auction on 8 April 1935. The rides and amusements were relocated to Sydney, with Luna Park Sydney opened in October 1935.

== History ==
In March 1928, F.S. Gordon presented a proposal to establish an amusement park to the Glenelg Town Council. To be built near Wigley Reserve, the amusement park was to be based on similar parks in Marseille and White City, London, and would include a scenic railway, a water chute, and other attractions. Gordon's proposal did not progress any further, although reclaimed land was set aside at Colley Reserve for such a venture. A lease to build a scenic railway (The Big Dipper) was granted to David Atkins in October 1929. The lease was expanded in February 1930 to allow for the construction of other attractions, including a Ferris wheel, Noah's Ark, River Caves, and Goofy House. Atkins and Herman Phillips founded Luna Park Glenelg Ltd, and built a park based on Luna Park Melbourne.

Luna Park Glenelg was opened on 8 October 1930. The park grounds were open to the surrounding area, with admission instead charged to the individual rides and attractions.

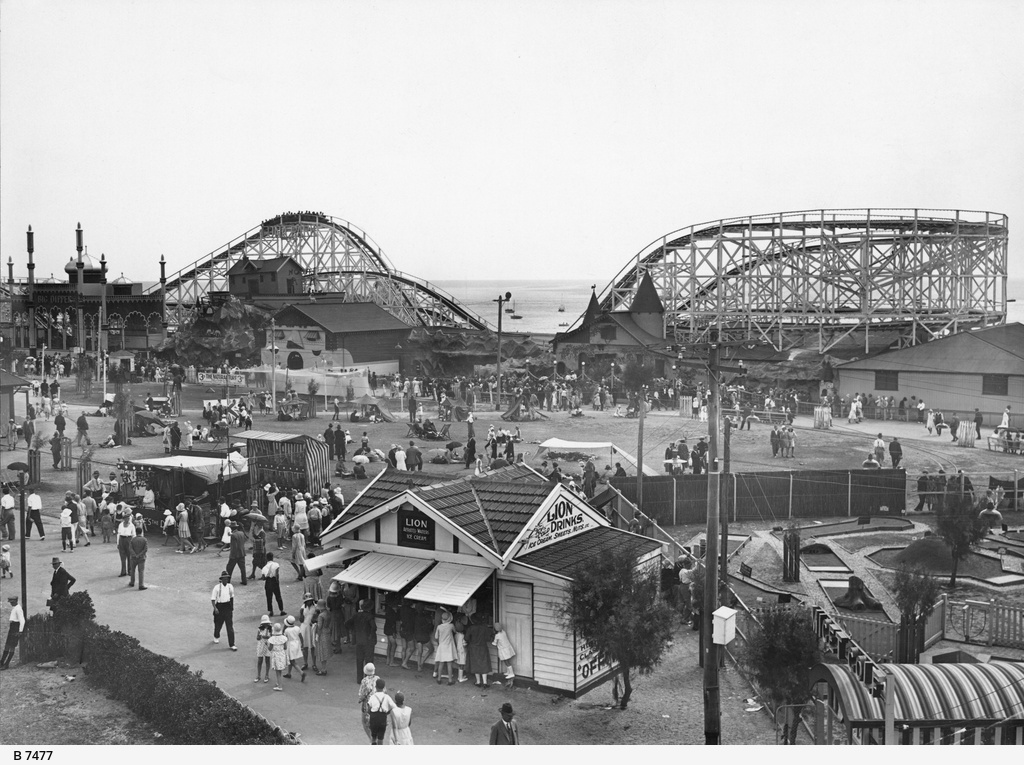
Colley Reserve and the newly opened Luna Park on the foreshore at Glenelg. The big dipper, mini golf, ice cream kiosk and the tracks for a miniature railway can be seen in the reserve.

On New Year's Eve 1932, a woman who was improperly seated and not holding on fell from the Big Dipper, and died in hospital the next day. Although allegations of intoxication or mechanical failure were made, the inquest concluded that the woman had committed suicide.

During the park's operation, there were disputes between park management and the council. Atkins asked the council on several occasions for a reduction in rent in response to a sharp fall in crowds, which were refused. Requests to open some of the rides on Sundays were also unanimously rejected. Local residents also claimed that the park was a magnet for undesirable types. Fearing a further deterioration in relationships with the council, Atkins began scouting for alternate locations. In 1934, a site was found at Milsons Point, Sydney: the former construction site for the Sydney Harbour Bridge, on the shore of Lavender Bay. The operating company was put into voluntary liquidation in late 1934, under the claim that the park was not profitable.

On 8 April 1935, the parks assets were put up for auction, all of which were purchased by Atkins and Phillips. The rides were dismantled and shipped to Sydney. The rides and equipment were assembled at the Lavender Bay site, with Luna Park Milsons Point opened on 4 October 1935. The amusement park, now known as Luna Park Sydney, remains in this location as of 2021.
