= Big Dipper (Luna Park Sydney, 1935) =

Defunct rollercoaster

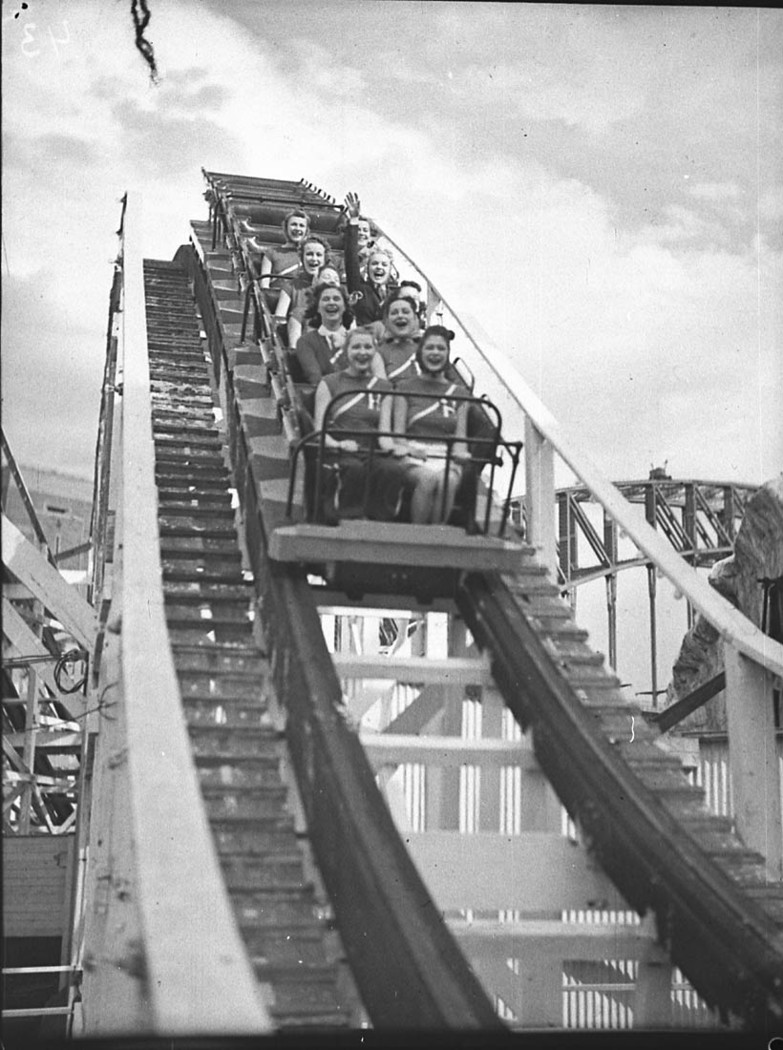
- Performers from the Hollywood Hotel revue riding Big Dipper in 1938

Luna Park Sydney
- Coordinates: 33°50′53.60″S 151°12′35.90″E
- Status: Removed
- Opening date: 4 October 1935
- Closing date: 16 April 1979 (Note: Demolished in 1981)

Luna Park Glenelg
- Coordinates: 34.9792°S 138.511°E
- Status: Removed
- Opening date: 1930
- Closing date: 1934

General statistics
- Type: Wood
- Designer: Miller & Baker Inc
- Track layout: Wood
- Lift/launch system: Chain
- Height: 52 ft (16 m)
- Length: 2,623 ft (799 m)
- Speed: 58 mph (93 km/h)
- Inversions: None
- Duration: 3 min (approx)
- Max vertical angle: 45°
- Big Dipper at RCDB

Big Dipper was a wooden roller coaster operating at Luna Park Sydney from 1935 until 1979. The ride was first constructed in 1930, a clone of Luna Park Melbourne's Big Dipper, designed by Miller & Baker Inc. The roller coaster was a mainstay of Luna Park Glenelg during its four years of operation. The ride was dismantled and shipped to Sydney when the Glenelg park went into voluntary liquidation in 1934, and became the biggest attraction of the newly opened Luna Park Sydney.

The ride was 800 metres (2,600 ft) long, lasted three minutes, could reach speeds of 84 kilometres per hour (52 mph), and when all three roller coaster trains were operating, could carry 72 people.

Big Dipper remained popular throughout its operating life. The coaster closed for repairs after two trains collided on 16 April 1979, before the entirety of Luna Park was closed following the Ghost Train fire. Big Dipper was demolished and burned, along with most of the 'old' Luna Park, when Australian Amusements Associates took over the site on 3 June 1981. Two of the nine roller coaster cars were purchased at the auction before the demolition; one is on display within Luna Park today, while the other is part of the Powerhouse Museum collection.

== Incidents ==
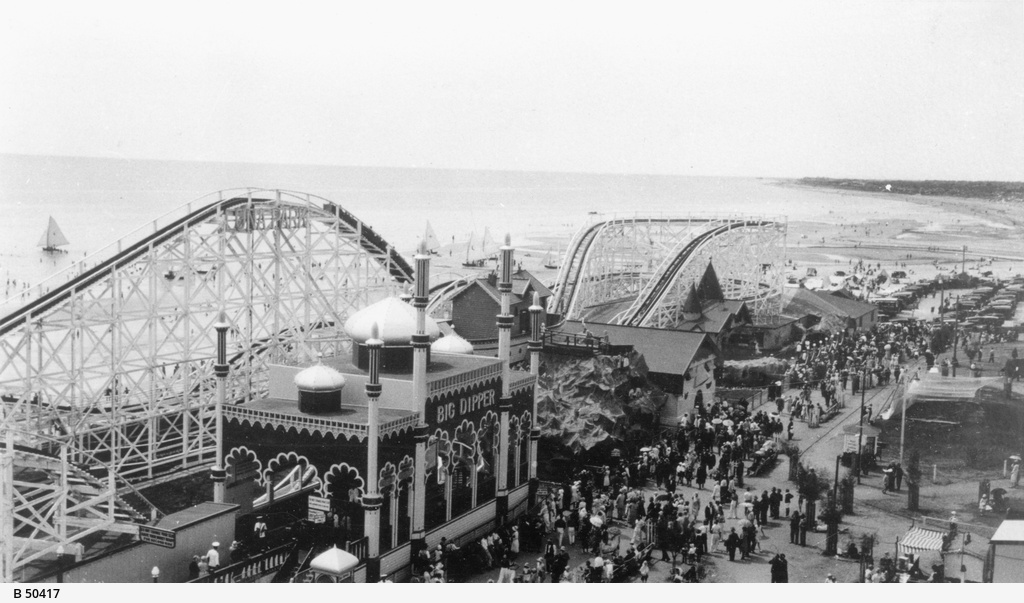
Big Dipper in its original location at Luna Park Glenelg

On New Year's Eve 1932, a woman who was improperly seated and not holding on fell from Big Dipper, and died in hospital the next day. Although allegations of intoxication or mechanical failure were made, the inquest concluded that the woman had committed suicide.

On 26 April 1946, a 33-year-old man from New Caledonia was killed on the ride. He disobeyed safety instructions by sitting on the edge of a train car, and was thrown from the ride on one of the corners and into a support pole.

On 16 April 1979, a steel runner had come loose, halting one of the three trains.The following train rammed the stationary one, causing 13 injuries. Big Dipper did not reopen after this incident, as the ride was still closed for repairs on the day of the Ghost Train fire.

== Successors ==
A steel roller coaster designed by Arrow Dynamics named Big Dipper opened at Luna Park in January 1995. Legal action and noise restrictions against the new roller coaster led to significant restrictions in its operational availability, which contributed to the 1996 closure of Luna Park. The ride was sold to Dreamworld in 2001, where it currently operates as The Gold Coaster.

On 26 December 2021 a new rollercoaster of the same name opened, manufactured by Intamin. A prototype "Hot Racer" model, it is the world's first launched single-rail coaster.
