= Devil's wheel =

Amusement ride

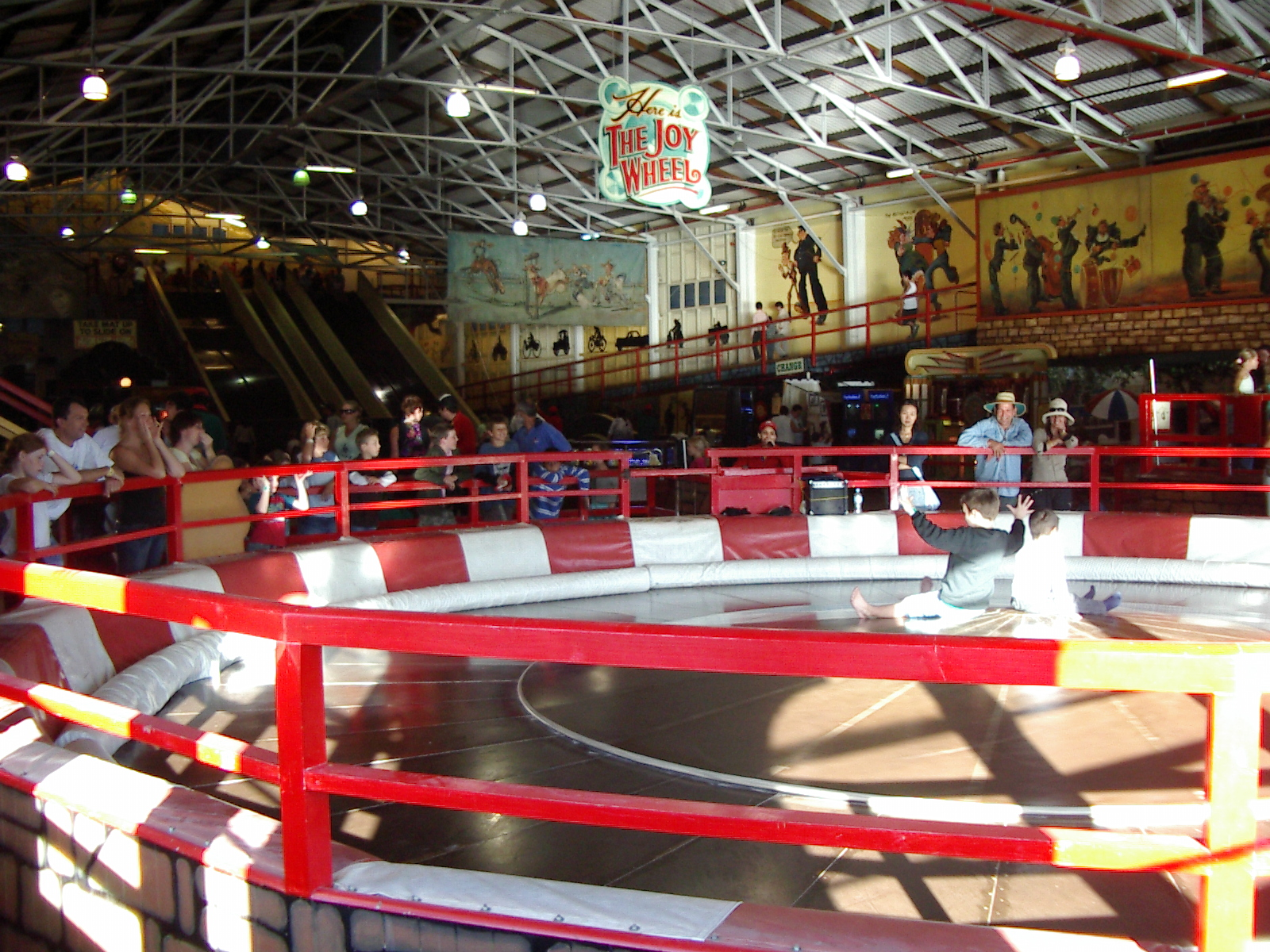
The Joy Wheel at Luna Park Sydney

A Devil's wheel, Teufelsrad, Human Roulette Wheel or Joy Wheel is an amusement ride commonly found at public festivals and fairs. Cited as being invented by George C. Tilyou, an early example opened at Steeplechase Park in 1907. Devil's wheels have notably been used at Oktoberfest celebrations since at least 1910.

== Design and operation ==
A Devil's wheel is a rotating circular platform upon which riders sit or lie. It begins by spinning slowly and increases its speed to make riders slide off the platform. Spectators stand around the platform, and the announcers often offer some satirical commentary.

Riders on the Devil's wheel at Oktoberfest in Munich, 2021

Riders who slide off the platform usually hit a cushioned wall. Injuries are possible if riders collide with spectators or other objects. An operator controls the speed of the platform, sometimes slowing it down to give participants the opportunity to re-position themselves toward the center.

Elements may be added to the Devil's Wheel to make it even more difficult for the riders to hold on. A ball attached to a chain may swing at them, the ride may shake or the announcer may ask riders to perform actions to cause them to lose their balance. A feature seen on some installations is a mild jolt of electricity transmitted through the metal screws holding the platform down. Riders have to contend with small electrical shocks while trying to hold on to the flat spinning surface.

== Function ==
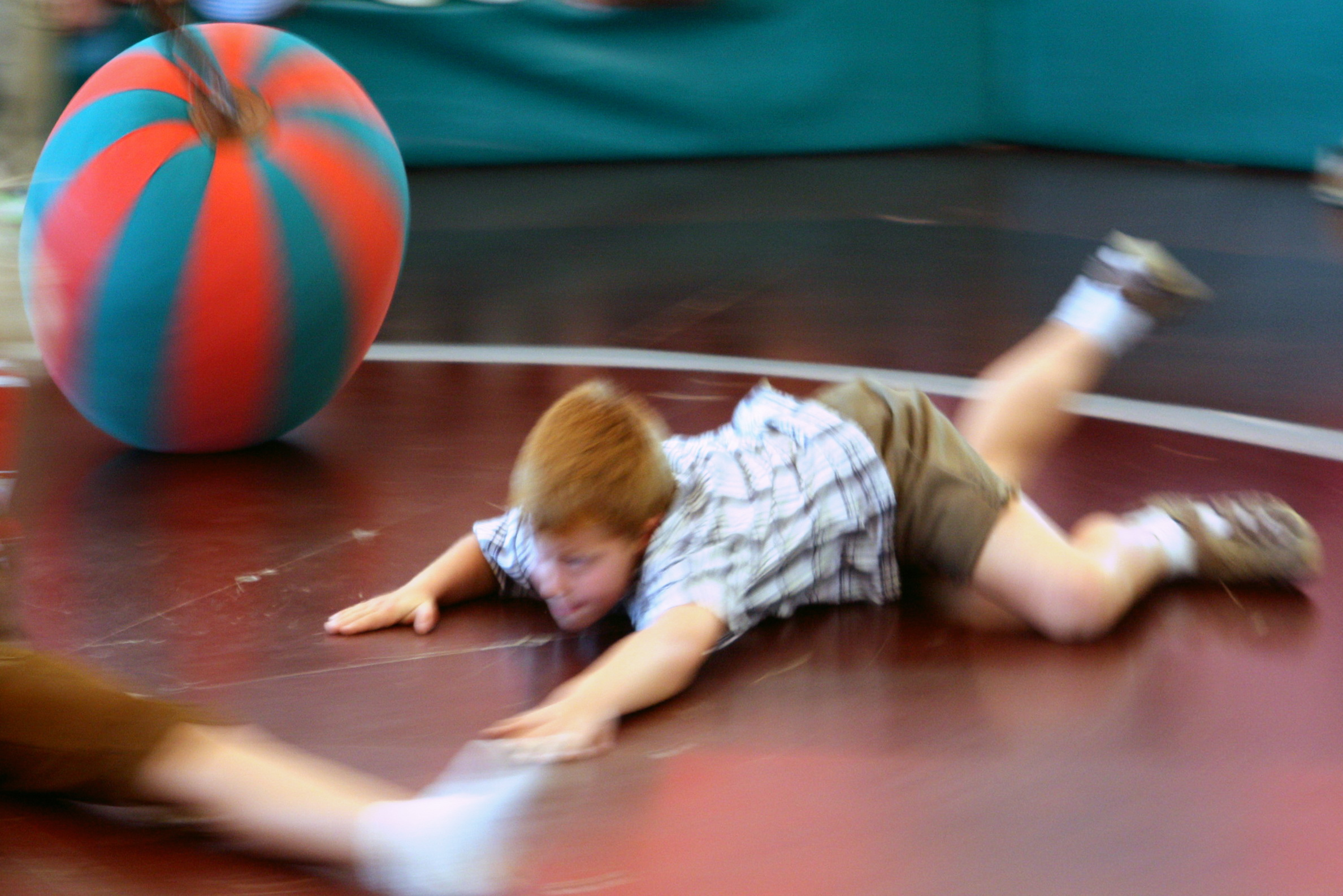
A boy sliding to the edge of the wheel; a ball is seen.

The platform is a disc. It is not an inertial system because of its rotation. The riders' sense of balance is compromised by the rotating disk. This complicates movement towards or away from the center of the wheel. If one is moving radially outward, in addition to the expected centrifugal force (directed outward), the Coriolis force applies directed tangentially (i.e. laterally).

== Versions and use ==
A permanent installation of a wooden Joy Wheel has operated at Luna Park Sydney since 1935.

A smaller version of the Devil's Wheel was displayed at EXPERIMINTA Science Center FrankfurtRheinMain in December 2011.

Devil's Wheels are still a part of the Munich Oktoberfest and in the Taunus Wunderland.

== In popular culture ==
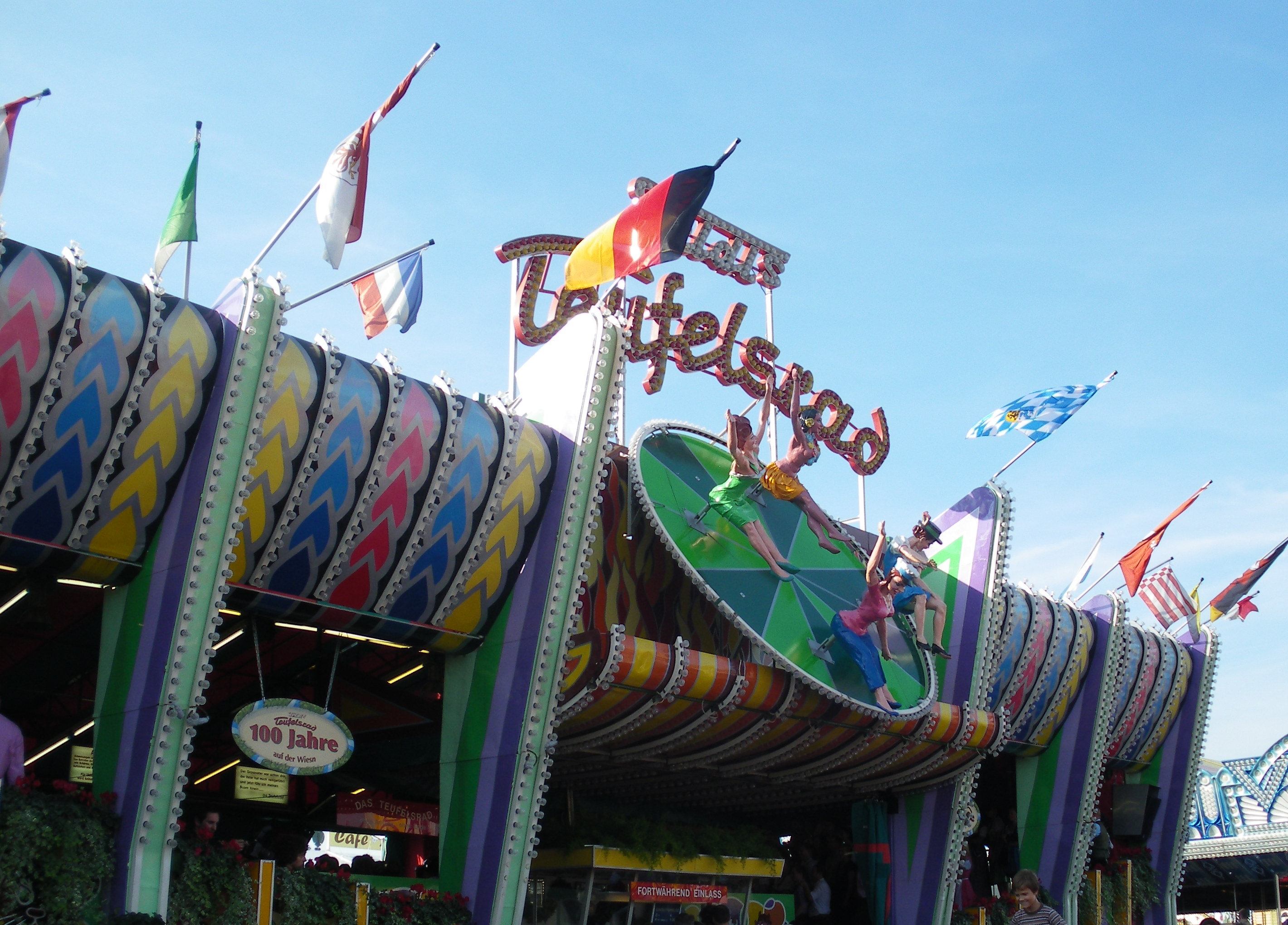
Facade of the Devil's Wheel (Teufelsrad) during the Oktoberfest in Munich

In Evelyn Waugh's first published novel, Decline and Fall, the character Otto Silenus describes a Devil's Wheel (referred to as the "big wheel at Luna Park") as a metaphor for life.

In the 1927 film It, Betty (Clara Bow) and Cyrus (Antonio Moreno), et al. are shown riding a Devil's Wheel. However, it is referred to as "Social Mixer".
