= S. John Ross (artist) =

Australian artist

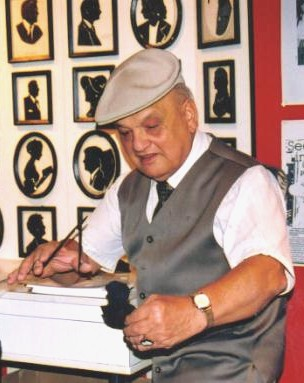
- S. John Ross at work at the Sydney Royal Easter Show
- Born: Sebastian John Ross; 24 April 1919; Detroit, Michigan, United States
- Died: 24 August 2008 (aged 89); Sydney, Australia
- Other names: The Silhouette Man; The Master of the Silhouette; The Silhouette Man of Luna Park; Scissors John
- Citizenship: Australian
- Occupations: Caricature artist; showman
- Years active: early 1950s-2008
- Known for: (A) Miniature silhouette portraits (B) Appearance's at the annual Sydney Royal Easter Show and the Brisbane Ekka and Luna Park, Sydney
- Spouse: Phyllis Counsell
- Children: 2 sons

Sebastian John Ross (24 April 1919 – 24 August 2008) was an American-born Australian caricature artist and showman, famous for his miniature silhouette portraits cut in black card and mounted on a white background. He made numerous media appearances and became a well-known identity at annual shows such as the Sydney Royal Easter Show and the Brisbane Ekka, where he worked each year for about 60 years. He was regarded within his lifetime as "a legend".

He first visited Australia in 1942 as a U.S. Serviceman, and in 1945 married an Australian WAAF, Phyllis Counsell. After returning to America in the late 1940s, in 1950 he moved permanently to Australia and lived in NSW at Springwood. In 1950 with some assistance from Jimmy Sharman Snr. He was introduced to the life of the Australian Outdoor Showmen and worked the shows up until 2008. In that time he worked capital shows in Sydney, Melbourne Adelaide and Brisbane. John also toured regional Queensland & NSW shows. John Ross worked at Luna Park Sydney from 1950 until 1979. From then until his death in 2008 aged 89, when not on tour, he worked at the observation deck at Sydney's Centrepoint Tower. During this time he created thousands of portraits, including that of many celebrities. He appeared on television and radio on many occasions and hundreds of articles were written about him in newspapers and magazines.

John was held in high regard by all in the Australian Show Society, being given many Show legend awards. When receiving one of these awards John always said jokingly that he would "rather be a live legend than a dead one". He also claimed that only the Australian Taxation Office knew what the "S" in his name stood for. He was sometimes referred to as Scissors John.

Ross Eastgate, a military historian and journalist, said of Ross that "He was not tall in stature, but he was giant in Australian entertainment."

== Early life ==
S. John Ross was born Sebastian John Ross, in Detroit, US, 24 April 1919. Inspired by an artist that he saw at Michigan State Fair, he trained with the silhouette artist Budd-Jack, travelling around to different fairs for three years. He later worked in Hollywood.

During World War II, he served in the Philippines, before a period in Australia where he served at Base Section 7 in Sydney, and as Staff Sergeant managed the US driving pool, driving entertainment celebrities such as Bob Hope and Jack Benny. In his search for good drivers, he employed a number of Australian women in the WAAAF, thus meeting Florence Phyllis Counsell (known as Phyllis). They married in February 1945.

After the war, Ross returned to the United States with his wife, then decided to settle permanently in Australia. They returned on the SS Lurline on 18 March 1946. They lived at Falcon Avenue, Hazelbrook, in the Blue Mountains, New South Wales. Ross and Phyllis had two sons, John Leyton Ross and Philip Ross.

== Career ==
=== Luna Park, Sydney Easter Show and Ekka ===
In 1948, Ross began to tour the circuit of agricultural shows as a silhouette artist, encouraged by the travelling showman and boxing entrepreneur Jimmy Sharman. He continued working at shows for the next 60 years, travelling as far as the Proserpine show in Queensland. From the 1950s until its closure in 1979, Ross worked at Luna Park, Sydney, unless he was touring shows. Later he worked at Centrepoint Tower.

He established his name on the show circuit, with generations of families taking their children to have their portraits cut out by him. In 2006 he was named an "Ekka Legend" by the Brisbane Exhibition and in 2007 was named a "Show Legend" at the Sydney Royal Easter Show. He was often heard to say that he would "rather be a living legend than a dead one". In 2004 he was commemorated at the reopened Luna Park with a mural painted by Ashley Taylor, an artist in residence.

== Death ==
In August 2008, S. John Ross did not attend the Brisbane Ekka as usual John had previously taken ill at Cairns During his annual northern Queensland show tour and returned to Sydney where he was rushed to Westmead Hospital. After some four weeks in hospital, Ross died on Sunday 24 August 2008 with his wife Phyllis (1918-2011) and younger son Philip present. He was 89.

== Work setting ==
Ross generally worked at shows in a little open booth, surrounded by a display of portraits that he had created of famous people. According to Ross, the art of making silhouettes was very important before the era of photography, and went back to Ancient Greece.

He worked quickly with a pair of small scissors, cutting portraits from thin matt black card. He usually concentrated on the profile, but would also enhance the portrait by snipping out a few details. Each portrait was mounted on white card. The likenesses were remarkable, so that it was easy to recognise the famous faces that were on display. He claimed that not everyone's face was suitable for profile portraits and that he was selective as to whom he would portray.

== Famous portraits ==
Among the celebrities whose portraits he made were Queen Elizabeth II, Sir Robert Menzies, Vivien Leigh and Nicole Kidman. In the United States, he had made portraits of Franklin D. Roosevelt, Stan Laurel, Al Jolson, Spencer Tracy and Mickey Rooney, Ernest Borgnine, Johnnie Ray and John Mills.
