= University of Sydney School of Chemistry =

Australian public university school

Coordinates: 33.887923°S 151.189538°E

School of Chemistry, University of Sydney
- Type: Public
- Established: 1882
- Parent institution: University of Sydney
- Head of School: Peter Rutledge
- Faculty: 65
- Undergraduates: 2000+
- Postgraduates: 120
- Location: Camperdown, New South Wales, Australia
- Website: School of Chemistry

The School of Chemistry, University of Sydney is a school of the Faculty of Science at the University of Sydney.

Two Nobel Laureates are associated with the School: John Cornforth completed his undergraduate degree in the School, graduating in 1938 with First Class Honours and the University Medal; and Robert Robinson was appointed as the first Professor of Pure and Applied Organic Chemistry at the university in 1912.

== History ==
The School of Chemistry was established as a part of the Faculty of Science in 1882. However, chemistry was taught at the University of Sydney since 1852. A purpose-built building was constructed on what was later named Science Road starting in 1888 and was completed in 1890. The building was designed largely by Archibald Liversidge, Professor of Chemistry and the first Dean of the Faculty of Science. The original Chemistry Building is now used by the Sydney Pharmacy School.

In 1945, a large fibro-cement building (known as "Tramsheds") was constructed for use by chemistry students until the current Chemistry Building opened in 1958. The current Chemistry Building is notable in architectural history as one of the first structures in Australia with a curtain wall design.

== Centres and initiatives ==
=== Laboratory of Advanced Catalysis for Sustainability ===
The School of Chemistry is home to the Laboratory of Advanced Catalysis for Sustainability which is focused broadly on catalysis, sustainable processes and fuels, green chemistry, and organometallic chemistry. Other areas the group is interested in include batteries, nanoparticles, ionic liquids, biofuels, and nanostructured materials.

The research group is led by Prof. Thomas Maschmeyer and consists of ca. 20 researchers.

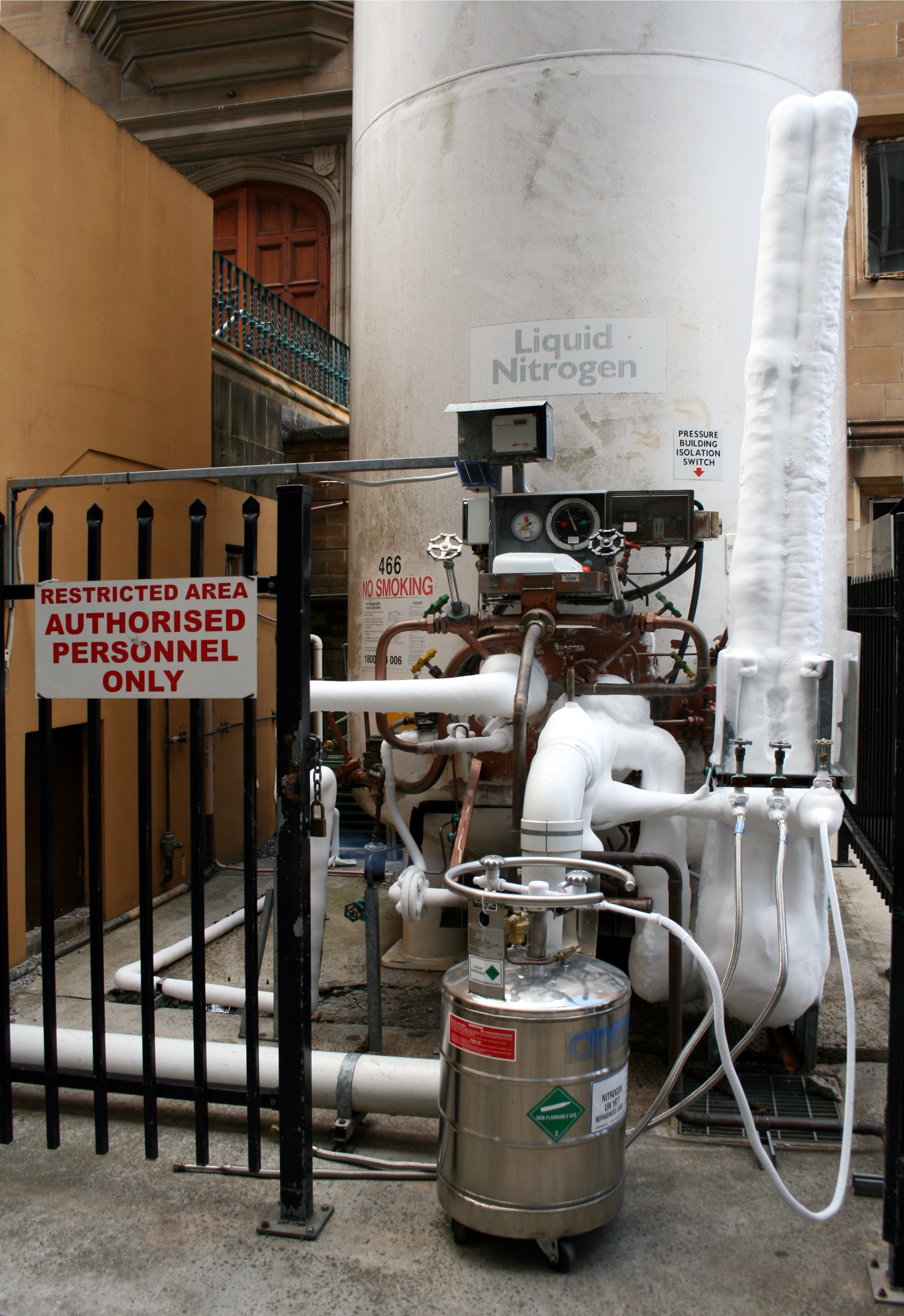
Liquid nitrogen tank adjacent to the Chemistry Building

=== Centre of Excellence in Exciton Science ===
The School of Chemistry has a node of the Centre of Excellence in Exciton Science which is a research collaboration between the University of Melbourne, University of New South Wales, RMIT University, University of Sydney, and Monash University.

The Centre of Excellence in Exciton Science is focused on novel materials for the development of low-cost, high efficiency, light-harvesting devices. The research programme utilises high-throughput screening, single molecule photochemistry, and ultrafast spectroscopy.

=== Drug Discovery Initiative ===
The Drug Discovery Initiative (DDI) was launched in 2018 to develop new drugs by working with clinicians and industry in infectious diseases, cancer, inflammation, neurodegenerative disorders, and metabolic diseases. However, the DDI is not limited to these areas and its research has contributed to antibiotics, cardiovascular diseases, and other health issues. Much of the research of the DDI uses facilities made available by Sydney Analytical such as X-ray scattering techniques and various types of spectroscopy, usually for characterisation of new drugs or proteins. Recent research within the DDI include Alzheimer's disease, malaria, and tuberculosis.

The current Academic Director of the DDI is Prof. Michael Kassiou.

=== Key Centre for Polymers and Colloids ===
The Key Centre for Polymers and Colloids (KCPC) is a research centre of the School of Chemistry established by the Australian Research Council Research Centres Program. While the KCPC is known for polymers and colloids, it comprises several groups that can specialise in different areas like self-assembly, virus mimics, emulsions, and surfactants. The KCPC has attracted various industry support such as Orica, Nuplex Industries, and others. Currently, faculty members involved in KCPC research are: A/Prof. Brian Hawkett, A/Prof. Chiara Neto, Dr. Mohammad Choucair, Prof. Greg Warr, Dr. Markus Muellner, and E/Prof. Les Copeland.

The current KCPC Director is A/Prof. Brian Hawkett.

== Academics ==
=== Admission ===
Admission to the School of Chemistry's research programs is competitive. Generally, admission to the School of Chemistry Honours program requires a SCIWAM of at least 65 or equivalent. Each faculty member is limited to 2.5 full-time equivalent (FTE) Honours students to ensure adequate supervision where co-supervised projects count as 0.5 FTE for each faculty. As a result, admission for some projects is significantly more competitive than others.

The School of Chemistry offer postgraduate research degrees in the Doctor of Philosophy, Master of Philosophy, and Graduate Diploma in Science where admission is by application to the University of Sydney. Applications for funding and scholarships is a separate application but also to the University of Sydney, this is a competitive process and a successful candidate is typically offered a stipend and a scholarship to cover living expenses and tuition fees, respectively.

=== Rankings ===
The University of Sydney has typically performed well on the QS Chemistry Subject Ranking, where it was 30th in 2013, 42nd in 2014, 51-100th in 2015, 49th in 2016, 50th in 2017, 43rd in 2018, and 51-100th in 2019. The University of Sydney has been 151-200th in the Academic Ranking of World Universities in chemistry since its inception in 2017. In 2018, U.S. News & World Report ranked the School of Chemistry, University of Sydney 138th in the world and 6th in Australia.

== Notable people ==
- Adrien Albert
- Albert Ernest Alexander
- Jane Foss Barff
- Henry H. Bauer
- James K. Beattie
- Arthur Birch
- Alexander Boden
- Brice Bosnich
- Mary Elizabeth Brown
- A. David Buckingham
- Samuel Warren Carey
- Warwick Cathro
- John Cornforth
- James Charles Cox
- David P. Craig
- Liz Dennis
- Francis Patrick Dwyer
- Jane Dyson
- Michelle Engelsman
- David Foster
- Hans Freeman
- Joan Maie Freeman
- Philip A. Gale
- Ruth Gall
- Robert Gilbert
- Frederick Bickell Guthrie
- Margaret Harding
- George Harker
- Rita Harradence
- Noel Hush
- Joseph Jacobs
- T. H. Laby
- Raymond Le Fèvre
- Don Levy
- Leonard Francis Lindoy
- Archibald Liversidge
- Lew Mander
- Thomas Maschmeyer
- Betty R. Moore
- P. A. P. Moran
- Alice Motion
- Lionel Murphy
- Elizabeth New
- Ronald Sydney Nyholm
- Ruby Payne-Scott
- Leo Radom
- John Read
- Edward Rennie
- Ezio Rizzardo
- Robert Robinson
- Alison Rodger
- Peter Rutledge
- Henry Chamberlain Russell
- Alan Sargeson
- Roberta Shepherd
- Charles Shoppee
- Henry George Smith
- John Smith
- John McGarvie Smith
- Sever Sternhell
- Matthew H. Todd
- Jill Trewhella
- Ian Wark
- David Warren
- David Weatherburn
- Jenny Zhang
