= Sternhell =

Sternhell is a surname. Notable people with the surname include:

- Zeev Sternhell (1935–2020), Israeli historian and one of the world's leading experts on fascism
- Sever Sternhell (1930–2022), Polish-born Australian academic and organic chemist
