= University of Sydney School of Molecular Bioscience =

School of Molecular Bioscience
- Type: Public
- Established: 2001
- Affiliations: University of Sydney
- Location: Camperdown / Darlington, New South Wales, Australia; 33.890429°S 151.191319°E
- Website: sydney.edu.au/science/molecular_bioscience

The School of Molecular Bioscience was a constituent body of the Faculty of Science at the University of Sydney, Australia and was established in 2001. This school was merged in 2016 to become the School of Life and Environmental Sciences.

== History ==
The School was renamed the School of Molecular Bioscience from the School of Molecular and Microbial Biosciences on 11 February 2010. The School of Molecular and Microbial Biosciences was formed in 2001 within the Faculty of Science from the amalgamation of the Department of Biochemistry from the Faculty of Science and the Department of Microbiology from the Faculty of Agriculture.

== See also ==
- S*, a collaboration between seven universities and the Karolinska Institutet for training in bioinformatics and genomics
