= Ian Ward (physicist) =

British physicist

Ian Macmillan Ward FRS
- Born: 9 April 1928; Stockton-on-Tees
- Died: 5 November 2018 (aged 90); Bramhope, Leeds
- Education: University of Oxford (MA, DPhil)
- Awards: Griffith Medal (1982); FRS (1983); Glazebrook Medal (2004)
- Scientific career
- Fields: Polymer science
- Workplaces: Polymer Interdisciplinary Research Centre; University of Leeds; University of Bradford; University of Bristol

Ian Macmillan Ward FRS FInstP (9 April 1928 – 5 November 2018) was a British physicist specialising in polymer science. He was Cavendish Professor of Physics in the School of Physics and Astronomy at the University of Leeds where he was also chairman of the School of Physics and Astronomy and first director of the Polymer Interdisciplinary Research Centre.

== Early life and education ==
Ward was educated at the Royal Grammar School, Newcastle upon Tyne and Magdalen College, Oxford.

== Career ==
Ward joined the Fibres division of the Imperial Chemical Industries as technical officer in 1954. Following a secondment to the Division of Applied Mathematics of Brown University (1961–1962), he became the head of the Basic Physics Section at the company. In 1965, he joined the University of Leeds as a lecturer in physics of materials, becoming a professor of physics in 1970 and Cavendish Professor in 1989, before retiring in 1994. He chaired the Department of Physics at Leeds from 1975 until 1978 and from 1987 until 1989. He served as the president of the British Society of Rheology from 1984 until 1986. In 1989, he became the first director of the Polymer Interdisciplinary Research Centre, holding the position until 1994. Ward was also a visiting professor at the University of Bradford.

He published 700 peer-reviewed journal articles, 6 textbooks and 20 major patents. He served as Editor of the journal Polymer published by Elsevier. He was managing director of several University of Leeds spin-off companies. These include Vantage Polymers for single polymer self-reinforced composites, die-drawn ropes and tubes, and Leeds Lithium Power for thermoreversible, ionically conducting polymer gel electrolytes used to manufacture lithium batteries.

== Awards and honours ==
Ward received awards from the Institute of Physics: Charles Vernon Boys Medal (1993), Glazebrook Medal (2004) – and the Institute of Materials: Griffith Medal (1982), Swinburne Medal (1988) and the Netlon Award (2004). In 1993, he received an honorary doctorate from the University of Bradford.

He was elected a Fellow of the Royal Society (FRS) in 1983. His certificate of election reads:

Physicist. Distinguished for his comprehensive investigations of properties of solid polymers and their relation to structure. The main thread through his work has been the elucidation of mechanical behaviour in highly anisotropic systems. He established the comprehensive methodology for characterising such systems, involving a wide range of mechanical, spectroscopic and other structure techniques. Through these he established correlations between properties and structure which have greatly contributed to the understanding of the behaviour of these systems and to the achievement of desired properties by planned orientation procedures. In the latter respect his work has led to the attainment of ultraoriented fibrous material of greatly enhanced stiffness and strength. Professor Ward also made salient contributions to viscoelastic relaxations, non-linear viscoelasticity, yield behaviour and to the study of molecular conformations by spectroscopic methods.

The Ian Macmillan Ward Prize for the Best Student Publication, awarded every two years to PhD students by the Institute of Physics Polymer Physics Group, is named in his honour.

In 2013, the Department of Materials of ETH Zurich awarded him the Staudinger–Durrer Prize in recognition of his pioneering contributions to the field of mechanical properties of solid polymers and polymer-based composites.

== Major works ==
- Ward, I. M. (2012). Mechanical properties of solid polymers. Chichester, West Sussex: John Wiley & Sons. ISBN 978-1-119-96711-8.
- Ward, I. M. (2004). An introduction to the mechanical properties of solid polymers. Chichester, West Sussex, England: Wiley. ISBN 978-0-471-49626-7.
- Ward, I. M. (2000). Solid Phase Processing of Polymers. Munich: Hanser. ISBN 3-446-19622-6.
- Ward, I. M. (1997). Structure and properties of oriented polymers. Dordrecht: Springer. ISBN 978-94-011-5844-2.
- Ward, I. M. (1987). Developments in Oriented Polymers--2. Dordrecht: Springer Netherlands. ISBN 978-94-009-3427-6.
- Ward, I. M. (1962). "Optical and Mechanical Anisotropy in Crystalline Polymers". Proceedings of the Physical Society. 80 (5). IOP Publishing: 1176–1188. Bibcode:1962PPS....80.1176W. doi:10.1088/0370-1328/80/5/319. ISSN 0370-1328.
