= Ruth Gall =

Chemistry academic and head of School of Chemistry at the University of Sydney

Ruth Gall (born Ruth Edna Lack; 8 November 1923 – 10 July 2017) was an Australian chemist and Head of School at the School of Chemistry, University of Sydney. She was the first female Head of School at the university.

== Early life ==
Gall attended and won sporting and academic prizes at Meriden School, a girls school where chemistry and physics were not taught at the time.

Soon after she completed her schooling, World War II broke out. Gall enlisted in the Women's Auxiliary Air Force (WAAF) and was sent to work on radar operations in Northern Queensland.

In 1944, at the age of 21 she returned to Sydney and was allowed under the Commonwealth Reconstruction Training Scheme to start university study in Science.

== Career ==
Gall took on some industrial positions, including working for British Industrial Solvents in London, where she shifted into a research role, before returning to Australia. After a short period in the Australian subsidiary of BIS, she secured a research role investigating coal at the CSIRO.

Gall was attracted through discussion with Sever Sternhell to further study, and a teaching fellowship in the Department of Organic Chemistry, part of the School of Chemistry at the University of Sydney. She completed her PhD under the supervision of Charles Shoppee in 1961.

Gall's academic career was entirely at the School of Chemistry at the University of Sydney. Her research concentrated on the fundamental study of steroids, including mechanisms, synthesis, and NMR spectroscopy. She began as a lecturer in 1962. There was opposition to her appointment based on her gender, but this was soon overcome as she established good relationships with both students and colleagues.

She was promoted to Senior Lecturer in 1966 and associate professor in 1969.

She became Head of School with unanimous support immediately after a change of rules allowed Associate Professors to take up the role.

== Honours, decorations, awards and distinctions ==
Gall has been honoured with a named lectureship, the Ruth Gall Memorial Lecture, on International Women's Day, and a portrait painting of her by Kate Gradwell is on the wall of Chemistry Lecture Theatre 3, named in her honour as the Ruth Gall Lecture Theatre.
