= David Mellor (disambiguation) =

David Mellor (born 1949) is a British former politician, broadcaster and football pundit.

David Mellor may also refer to:

- David Mellor (designer) (1930–2009), British designer
- David Mellor (footballer) (born 1993), British footballer for Oldham Athletic
- David Alan Mellor (1948–2023), British curator and professor of and writer on art
- David Paver Mellor (1903–1980), Australian inorganic chemist
- David Hugh Mellor (1938–2020), English philosopher
