= Leslie Copeland =

Leslie Copeland may refer to:

- Les C. Copeland (1887–1942), American composer
- Les Copeland (chemist) (born 1946), Australian agricultural chemist
- Leslie Copeland (athlete) (born 1988), Fijian javelin thrower
