= Lionel Murphy =

Australian politician (1922–1986)

The Honourable Lionel Murphy QC
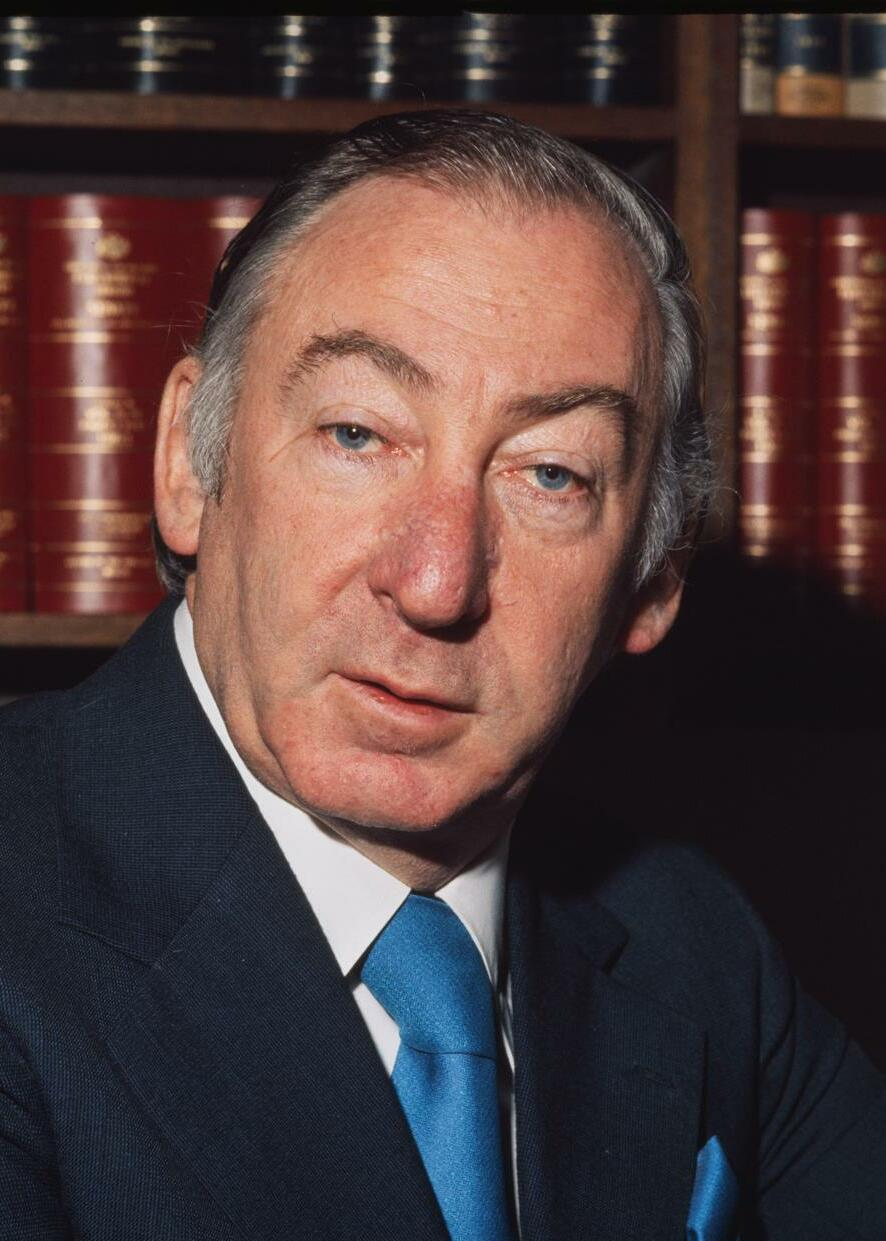
- Murphy in 1972

Justice of the High Court of Australia
- In office 10 February 1975 – 21 October 1986
- Nominated by: Gough Whitlam
- Appointed by: Sir John Kerr
- Preceded by: Sir Douglas Menzies
- Succeeded by: John Toohey

Attorney-General of Australia
- In office 19 December 1972 – 9 February 1975
- Prime Minister: Gough Whitlam
- Preceded by: Gough Whitlam (Note: Whitlam appointed himself Attorney-General for two weeks as part of First Whitlam ministry with Lance Barnard. His predecessor was Ivor Greenwood.)
- Succeeded by: Kep Enderby

Leader of the Government in the Senate
- In office 2 December 1972 – 9 February 1975; Acting: 2 December — 19 December 1972
- Preceded by: Ken Anderson
- Succeeded by: Ken Wriedt

Leader of the Opposition in the Senate
- In office 8 February 1967 – 5 December 1972
- Preceded by: Don Willesee
- Succeeded by: Reg Withers

Senator for New South Wales
- In office 1 July 1962 – 9 February 1975
- Preceded by: John McCallum
- Succeeded by: Cleaver Bunton

Personal details
- Born: Lionel Keith Murphy; 30 August 1922 Kensington, New South Wales, Australia
- Died: 21 October 1986 (aged 64) Canberra, Australian Capital Territory, Australia
- Party: Labor
- Spouse(s): Nina Morrow (née Vishegor-odsky; known as Svidersky); Ingrid Gee (née Grzonkowski)
- Education: University of Sydney

Lionel Keith Murphy (30 August 1922 – 21 October 1986) was an Australian politician, barrister, and judge. He was a Senator for New South Wales from 1962 to 1975, serving as Attorney-General in the Whitlam government, and then sat on the High Court from 1975 until his death in 1986.

Murphy was born in Sydney, and attended Sydney Boys High School before matriculating at the University of Sydney. He initially graduated with a degree in chemistry, but then went on to Sydney Law School and eventually became a barrister. He specialised in labour and industrial law, and took silk in 1960. Murphy was elected to the Senate at the 1961 federal election, as a member of the Labor Party. He became Leader of the Opposition in the Senate in 1967.

Following Labor's victory at the 1972 federal election, Gough Whitlam appointed Murphy as Attorney-General and Minister for Customs & Excise. He oversaw a number of reforms, establishing the Family Court of Australia, the Law Reform Commission, and the Australian Institute of Criminology, and developing the Family Law Act 1975, which fully established no-fault divorce. He also authorised the 1973 Murphy raids on ASIO. In 1975, following the death of Douglas Menzies, Murphy was appointed to the High Court. He is the most recent politician to be appointed to the court.

On the court, Murphy was known for his radicalism and judicial activism. However, his final years were marred by persistent allegations of corruption. He was convicted of perverting the course of justice in 1985, but had the conviction overturned on appeal and was acquitted at a second trial. In 1986, a commission was established to determine whether he was fit to remain on the court, but it was abandoned when Murphy announced that he was suffering from terminal cancer.

== Early life and education ==
Murphy was the youngest of five sons, and sixth of seven children of William, a native of County Tipperary, and Lily Murphy. He was born and grew up in Sydney. Though the Murphy household was Irish Catholic, albeit estranged from the Church, Murphy became a humanist and rationalist.

He was educated at government schools in Sydney's Eastern Suburbs, including Kensington Public School in Kensington, where he was dux after repeating his final year in 1935, and Sydney Boys High School from 1936 to 1940 in nearby Moore Park, graduating with A levels in English, Mathematics, and Chemistry and B levels in Physics and French. After completing his secondary education, in 1941, Murphy matriculated to the University of Sydney, though he had not been successful in gaining a university scholarship awarded to the top 100 in the state. His initial scholastic performance was ordinary and he briefly considered transferring to study a Bachelor of Arts majoring in psychology at the Faculty of Arts.

Murphy excelled in his final year, graduating from the School of Chemistry, Faculty of Science with a Bachelor of Science with Honours in Organic Chemistry. In 1943, he commenced working in the chemical industry, thereby coming under the authority of the wartime Manpower Directorate.

In 1945, Murphy commenced studying law at the Sydney Law School of the University of Sydney and, in 1949, graduated with a Bachelor of Laws with Honours. While at the University of Sydney, during both his science and law degrees, Murphy was politically and socially active and was involved in the Students' Chemistry Society, the Junior Science Association, and the Science Association.

In 1944, in his third year of his science degree, Murphy was elected to the Students' Representative Council but was dismissed two hours after his election victory, on a "constitutional technicality". This event is said to have cemented his interest in politics and law, and he commenced participating in the university's debating society and its monthly debates the following year.

== Legal career ==
Unusually, two years prior to his graduating with and possessing a law degree, Murphy passed the Barristers' Admission Board examination and was admitted to the New South Wales Bar Association in 1947. After graduating from the University of Sydney Faculty of Law, Murphy took up residence in University Chambers, Phillip Street and then moved to the fourth floor of Wentworth Chambers. He rapidly established himself as a labour/industrial lawyer, representing left-wing unionists.

In 1960, he was appointed as a Queen's Counsel.

== Parliamentary career ==
Murphy was a member of the Australian Labor Party from an early age. In the Senate pre-selection convention in the Sydney Trades Hall in April 1960, he had the backing of Ray Gietzelt but lacked factional endorsement. However, he drew first position in addressing the delegates and won support with an impassioned but well-structured and infectiously optimistic seven-minute speech on the Labor Party's historical commitment to civil liberties and human rights. He was elected to the Australian Senate in 1961, and, in 1967, he was elected Opposition Leader in the Senate.

=== Attorney-Generalship ===
In 1969, Labor Leader Gough Whitlam appointed him Shadow Attorney-General and, when Labor won the 1972 election, he became Attorney-General and Minister for Customs & Excise. One of Murphy's more dramatic actions as Attorney-General was his sudden visit to the Melbourne headquarters of the Australian Security Intelligence Organisation (ASIO) on 16 March 1973. This came about because ASIO officers were unable to satisfy his requests for information concerning intelligence on supposed terrorist groups operated by the Ustaše in Australia. Murphy's concern about the matter was heightened by the impending visit to Australia of the Yugoslav Prime Minister Džemal Bijedić. ASIO officers claimed not to be able to locate the file with which to properly brief Murphy. Murphy's belief was that, though a security service was an important part of the Australian social fabric, like any other arm of executive government it must be accountable to the relevant Minister. According to journalist George Negus, then Murphy's press secretary: "Lionel had asked for the files of the six most dangerous or subversive people in Australia". When the files arrived, Murphy found they were of several Communist Party (CPA) unionists and people such as CPA leader and peace movement activist Mavis Robertson. When he told Whitlam, they both laughed.

Murphy was highly involved in the behind-the-scenes machinations and parliamentary debates around the appointment of DLP Senator Vince Gair as Ambassador to Ireland in 1974 (see Gair Affair), which preceded Whitlam's calling of a double dissolution election for May 1974.

Murphy's most important legislative achievement was the Family Law Act 1975, which completely overhauled Australia's law on divorce and other family law matters. It established the principle of "no-fault divorce", in the face of opposition from the Roman Catholic Church and many other individuals and organisations. This act also established the Family Court of Australia.

=== Civil Celebrants ===
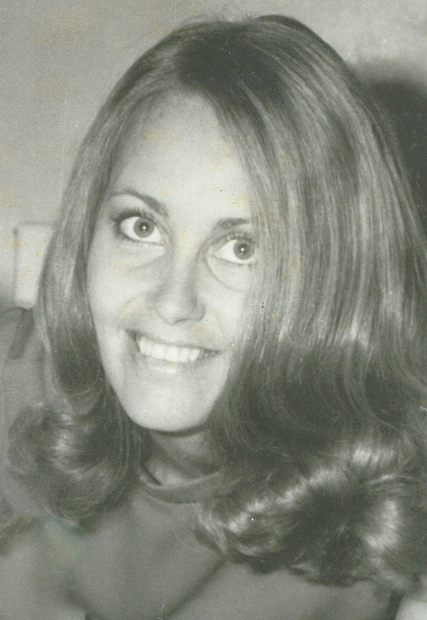
Lois D'Arcy was the first independent civil marriage celebrant ever appointed — by Attorney-General Lionel Murphy. Her appointment is dated 19 July 1973.

Murphy used an existing provision of the Marriage Act 1961 (Section 39C) to establish the Civil Marriage Celebrant programme. Using this provision he appointed about a hundred Civil Celebrants and urged them to provide marriage ceremonies of dignity, meaning and substance for non-church people. It was an initiative opposed by the Australian Labor Party, the public servants of his department and his personal staff.

The civil celebrant program is almost entirely the result of one man’s vision. Murphy himself told me the story of how he was opposed by his own staff, the public service, his fellow Members of Parliament s and officials of the Labour Party. He defied all, and, on July 19, 1973, in the dead of night typed the first appointment himself, found the envelope and stamp, walked to a post box and posted it himself. Lois D’Arcy, carries the honour of being appointed the first genuinely independent civil celebrant in Australia, and actually in all the world.

Although it was a radical move at the time, the programme proved to be very successful. In 2015, 74.9 per cent of marrying couples in Australia chose a civil marriage celebrant to officiate. The programme broadened to include secular funerals of substance, namings and other ceremonies which celebrated the landmarks of human existence. Murphy took an enthusiastic interest in this programme - sending telegrams of congratulation to the first several hundred couples married by civil celebrants and would often unexpectedly turn up uninvited to weddings performed by celebrants to delight in his achievement.

=== Human Rights Bill ===
As Attorney-General, Murphy drew up a Human Rights Bill (which lapsed with the double dissolution of 1974) giving as among the reasons: "in criminal law, our protections against detention for interrogation and unreasonable search and seizure, for access to counsel and to ensure the segregation of different categories of prisoners are inadequate. Australian laws on the powers of the police, the rights of an accused person and the state of the penal system generally are unsatisfactory. Our privacy laws are vague and ineffective. There are few effective constraints on the gathering of information, or its disclosure, or surveillance, against unwanted publicity by government, the media or commercial organisations". Murphy also introduced important legislation substantially abolishing appeals to the Judicial Committee of the Privy Council, removing censorship, providing freedom of access to government information, reforming corporations and trade practices law, protecting the environment, abolishing the death penalty and outlawing racial and other discrimination.

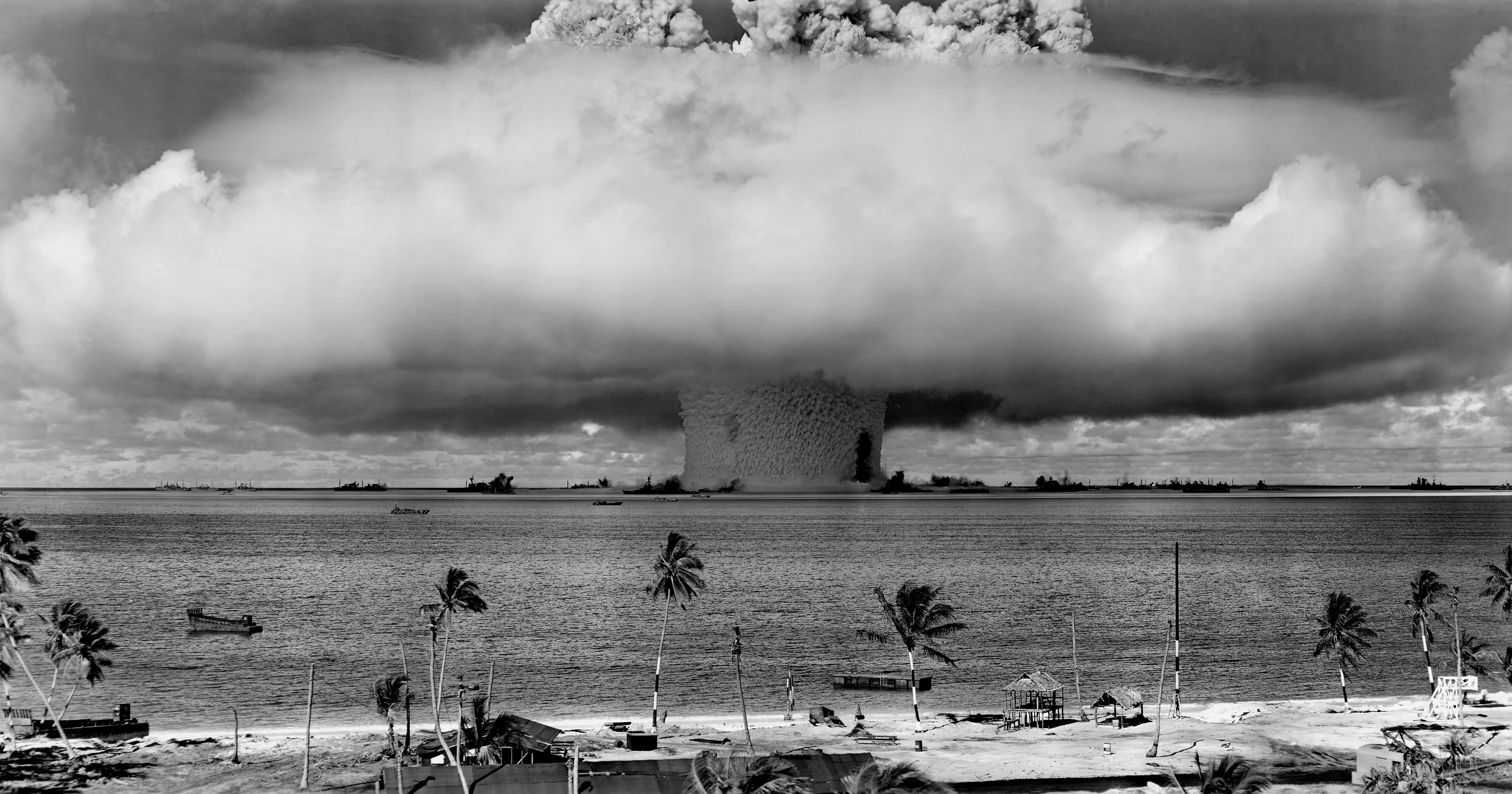
Atmospheric nuclear explosion in the Pacific. Murphy took the French Government to the International Court of Justice over nuclear tests at Mururoa.

Furthermore, Murphy established a systematic legal aid service for all courts, set up the Australian Law Reform Commission with Michael Kirby as its inaugural chairman and set up the Australian Institute of Criminology.

Murphy took the French Government to the International Court of Justice (ICJ) to protest against its nuclear tests in the Pacific. The French government conducted 41 atmospheric nuclear tests at Mururoa after 1966 and formally ceased atmospheric nuclear testing in 1974 as a result of public pressure facilitated by Murphy's ICJ case.

== Judicial career ==
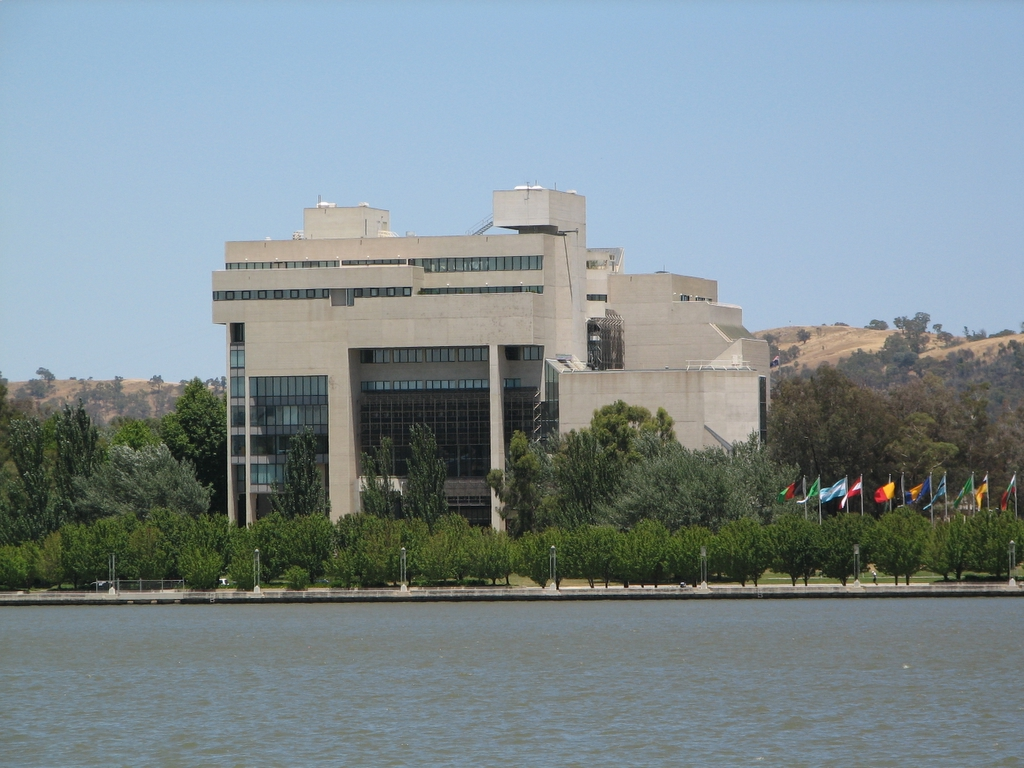
High Court of Australia. Murphy served as a High Court justice from 1975 to 1986.

In February 1975, Whitlam appointed Murphy to a vacancy on the High Court of Australia. He was the first serving Labor politician appointed to the Court since Herbert Evatt in 1931 and the appointment was bitterly criticised. He resigned from the Senate on 9 February 1975 to take up the appointment. Murphy was the last High Court justice to have served as a Member of Parliament, and the last politician appointed to the High Court. Additionally, Murphy was one of only eight justices of the High Court to have served in the Parliament of Australia prior to his appointment to the Court, along with Edmund Barton, Richard O'Connor, Isaac Isaacs, Henry Higgins, Edward McTiernan, John Latham and Garfield Barwick.

Although it did not become a constitutional requirement until 1977, it had been long-standing convention that a Senate casual vacancy be filled by a person from the same political party. However, on 27 February 1975, the Premier of New South Wales, Tom Lewis, controversially appointed Cleaver Bunton, a person with no political affiliations, to replace Murphy in the Senate, beginning the chain of events which led to the 1975 Australian constitutional crisis. These events provided the impetus for the 1977 constitutional change that ensures such an appointment cannot be repeated, although a State Government can still achieve a similar result by declining to fill a Senate vacancy. Soon after his appointment to the bench, Murphy visited Justice Menzies' old chambers in Taylor Square, which would now be his. Staring at the volumes of British law reports on the shelves behind his desk, he said, "I want all of these to go". He replaced them with decisions from the Supreme Court of the United States.

== Court cases and death ==
In the summer of 1983/84, during the term of the first Hawke government, both The National Times and The Age published transcripts of telephone conversations illegally recorded from 1979 to 1981 by the New South Wales Police. Although not then authenticated, they were allegedly between Murphy and Sydney lawyer Morgan Ryan, who in 1982 faced charges of forgery and conspiracy.

In July 1985, Murphy was initially convicted on one of two charges of attempting to pervert the course of justice, over new allegations made by Clarrie Briese, the Chief Magistrate of New South Wales, that Murphy had attempted to influence a court case against Morgan Ryan, whom Murphy referred to as "my little mate". A subsequent appeal to the NSW Court of Appeals quashed Murphy's conviction on the grounds that the trial judge had misdirected the jury.

A second trial was then held and, on 28 April 1986, Murphy was found not guilty of attempting to pervert the course of justice. After his acquittal, Murphy said, "Thank heavens for the jury system!". Despite being a well-educated judge, Murphy's defence rested on an unsworn, or "dock statement" (typically used by those who are unable to communicate fluently, or represent themselves), which avoided the possibility of being cross-examined in court. (Note: Use of such statements has now been restricted in most Australian states and England and Wales)

Due to the seriousness of the allegations, Attorney-General Lionel Bowen, acting on what he said was his belief that the Justices of the High Court were minded to take some independent action to assess Justice Murphy's fitness to return to the Court, introduced legislation for a Parliamentary Commission of Inquiry, consisting of three retired judges, to examine "whether any conduct of the Honourable Lionel Keith Murphy has been such as to amount, in its opinion, to proved misbehaviour within the meaning of section 72 of the Constitution". (Section 72 specifies that a High Court judge may be removed only by the Governor-General and both houses of Parliament "on the ground of proved misbehaviour or incapacity".) The terms of this inquiry specifically excluded the issues for which Murphy had already been tried and acquitted.

The legislation establishing the Commission of Inquiry received assent in May 1986. In July, Murphy announced that he was dying of terminal cancer, and the establishing legislation was repealed. The Speaker of the House of Representatives and the President of the Senate were given control of the commission's documents. Murphy returned to the Court for one week of sittings. He died on 21 October 1986.

== Personal life ==
Murphy had a distinctive profile and a large nose that was broken in a 1950 car accident in England and left largely untreated.

In July 1954, he married Russian-born Nina Morrow (née Vishegorodsky; known as Svidersky), a comptometrist, at St John's Anglican Church, Darlinghurst, Sydney. Their daughter, Lorel Katherine, was born in 1955. In 1967, Murphy's marriage to Nina ended in divorce.

In 1969, Murphy married Ingrid Gee (née Grzonkowski), a model and television quiz-show compère who had been born in German-occupied Poland. They had two sons, Cameron and Blake. Cameron was President of the New South Wales Council for Civil Liberties from 1999 to 2013. Ingrid died in October 2007.

In 2021, the ABC investigative series Exposed: The Ghost Train Fire aired an allegation, for which they provided no evidence, that Murphy and NSW Premier Neville Wran had conspired with organised crime figure Abe Saffron to help Saffron's relatives obtain the Luna Park lease after the 1979 Sydney Ghost Train fire, which caused the deaths of six children and an adult.

== Judicial quotes ==
- Australian Aboriginal history:

The history of the Aboriginal people of Australia since European settlement is that they have been the subject of unprovoked aggression, conquest, pillage, rape, brutalisation, attempted genocide and systematic and unsystematic destruction of their culture…a law aimed at the preservation, or the uncovering, of evidence about their history is a special law with respect to the people of this race.

- Freedom of religion:

Religious freedom is a fundamental theme of our society. That freedom has been asserted by men and women throughout history by resisting the attempts of government, through its legislative, executive or judicial branches, to define or impose beliefs or practices of religion. Whenever the legislature prescribes what religion is, or permits or requires the executive or judiciary to determine what religion is, this poses a threat to religious freedom. Religious discrimination by officials or by courts is unacceptable in a free society… In the eyes of the law, religions are equal. There is no religious club with a monopoly of State privileges for its members. The policy of the law is "one in, all in".

The faith of members of various religions has inspired concern for others which has often been reflected in humanitarian and charitable works. However, the claim to be the one true faith has resulted in great intolerance and persecution. Because of this, the history of many religions includes a ghastly record of persecution and torture of non-believers. Hundreds of millions of people have been slaughtered in the name of god, love and peace. In the effort to uphold "the one true faith" courts have often been instruments for the repression of blasphemers, heretics and witches…Most organised religions have been riddled with commercialism, this being an integral part of the drive by their leaders for social authority and power in conformity with the "iron law of oligarchy".

- Freedom of speech:

The absence of a constitutional guarantee does not mean that Australia should accept judicial inroads upon freedom of speech which are not found necessary or desirable in other countries. At stake is not merely the freedom of one person; it is the freedom of everyone to comment rightly or wrongly on the decisions of the courts in a way that does not constitute a clear and present danger to the administration of justice.

- Trial by jury:

The Constitution s.80 states: "The trial on indictment of any offence against any law of the Commonwealth shall be by jury…" This Court has construed this section to mean that if there be no indictment there must be a jury but there is nothing to compel procedure by indictment…In a famous dissent Dixon and Evatt JJ described this construction as a mockery of the Constitution and considered that anyone charged with any serious offence against the laws of the Commonwealth was entitled to trial by jury (Lowenstein (1938) 59 CLR 556, 582).

The jury is a strong antidote to the elitist tendencies of the legal system. It is "the means by which the people participate in the administration of justice" (Jackson v the Queen (1976) 134 CLR 42 at 54). The greatest respect should be given by appeal courts to jury verdicts and any attempt to downgrade the jury to a mere nominal or symbolic role should be restricted.

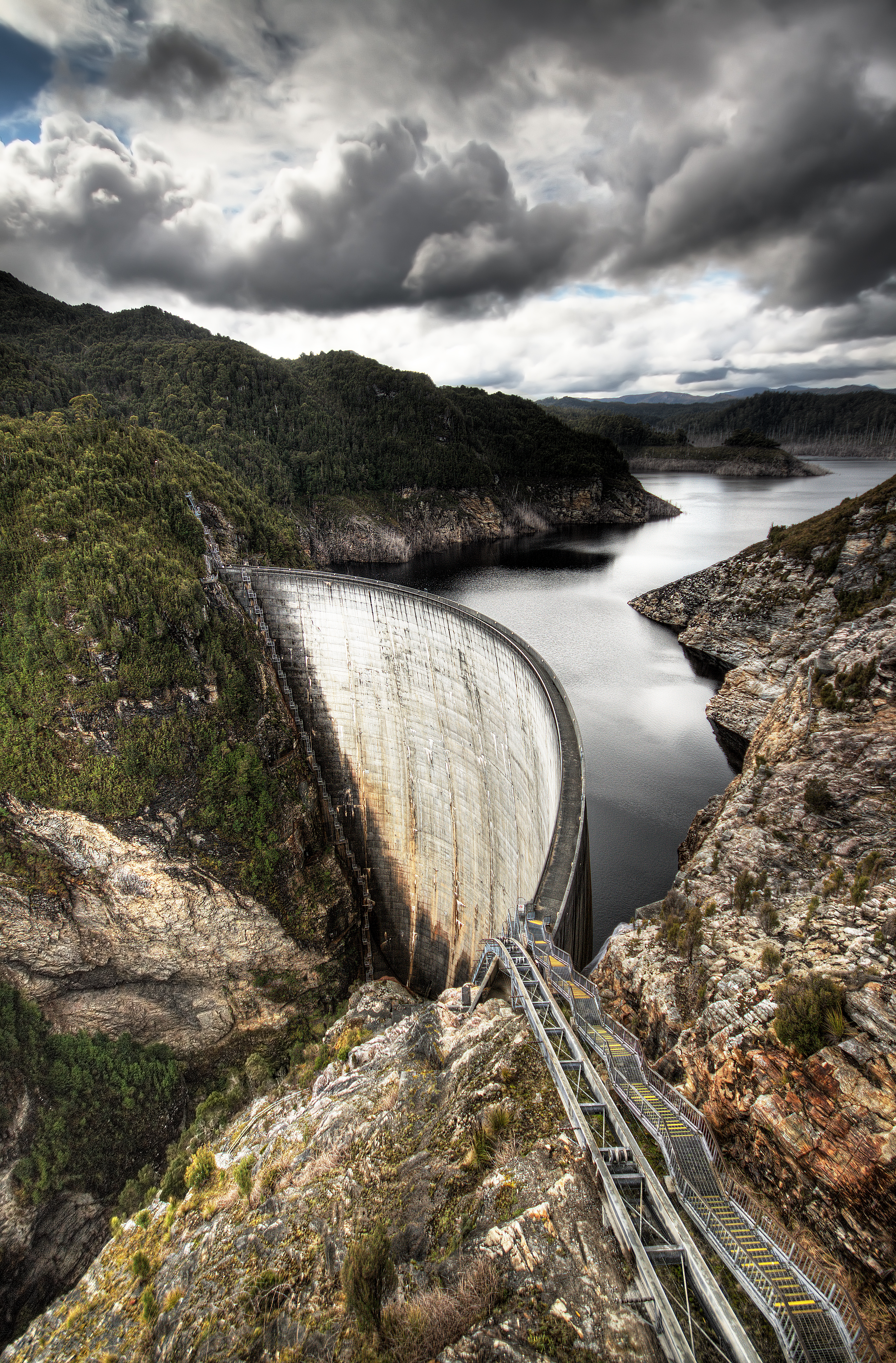
Gordon Dam in South West Tasmania World Heritage Area.

Preservation of the world's natural heritage:

Suppose that in the next few decades, because of the continuing rapid depletion of the world's forests and its effect on the rest of the biosphere, the survival of all living creatures becomes endangered. This is not a fanciful supposition… Suppose the United Nations were to request all nations to do whatever they could to preserve the existing forests. Let us assume that no obligation was created (because firewood was essential for the immediate survival of people of some nations). I would have no doubt that the Australian Parliament could, under the external affairs power, comply with that request by legislating to prevent the destruction of any forest.

The world's cultural and natural heritage is, of its own nature, part of Australia's external affairs. It is the heritage of Australians, as part of humanity, as well as the heritage of those where the items happen to be.

- Constitutional prohibition of slavery:

It would not be constitutionally permissible for the Parliament of Australia or any of the States to create or authorise slavery or serfdom. The reason lies in the nature of our Constitution. It is a Constitution for a free society.

- Constitutional prohibition on civil conscription for medical or dental services:

The Australian Constitution "contains an implication of a free society which limits Parliament's authority to impose civil conscription".

- Common heritage of humanity:

The preservation of the world's heritage must not be looked at in isolation but as part of the co-operation between nations which is calculated to achieve intellectual and moral solidarity of mankind and so reinforce the bonds between people which promote peace and displace those of narrow nationalism and alienation which promote war… The encouragement of people to think internationally, to regard the culture of their own country as part of world culture, to conceive a physical, spiritual and intellectual world heritage, is important in the endeavour to avoid the destruction of humanity.

- Theory of class struggle:

Public statements that the courts are involved in the class struggle may tend to impair confidence in the courts (and amount to criminal contempt on the Dunbabin standard) but do not constitute any clear and present danger to the administration of justice. If all those who advocate that the courts are involved in the class struggle were to be imprisoned for criminal contempt there would not be enough gaols.

- Right to vote:

Section 41 is one of the few guarantees of the rights of persons in the Australian Constitution. It should be given the purposive interpretation which accords with its plain words, with its context of other provisions of unlimited duration, and its contrast with transitional provisions. Constitutions are to be read broadly and not pedantically. Guarantees of personal rights should not be read narrowly. A right to vote is so precious that it should not [be] read out of the constitution by implication. Rather every reasonable presumption and interpretation should be adopted which favours the right of people to participate in the elections of those who represent them."

- Privilege against self-incrimination:

The privilege against compulsory self-incrimination is part of the common law of human rights. It is based on the desire to protect personal freedom and human dignity. These social values justify the impediment the privilege presents to judicial or other investigation… It is society's acceptance of the inviolability of the human personality… The history and reasons for the privilege do not justify its extension to artificial persons such as corporations or political entities.

Because the privilege is such an important human right, an intent to exclude or qualify the privilege will not be imputed to a legislature unless the intent is conveyed in unmistakable language.

- Legal professional privilege:

The privilege is commonly described as legal professional privilege, which is unfortunate, because it suggests that the privilege is that of the members of the legal profession, which it is not. It is the client's privilege, so that it may be waived by the client, but not by the lawyer… Its rationale is no longer the oath and honour of the lawyer as a gentleman… It is now supported as a "necessary corollary of fundamental, constitutional or human rights".

- Acquisition of property on just terms:

…the extinction or limitation of property rights does not amount to acquisition. The transfer of property from one person to another, not the Commonwealth, does not amount to an acquisition within par. xxxi. Unless the Commonwealth gains some property from the State or person, there is no acquisition within the paragraph."

- Control of multinational corporations:

There may be circumstances where Australia's relationship with persons or groups who are not nation States, is part of external affairs. The existence of powerful transnational corporations, international trade unions and other groups who can affect Australia, means that Australia's external affairs, as a matter of practicality, are not confined to relations with other nation states."

== Legacy ==
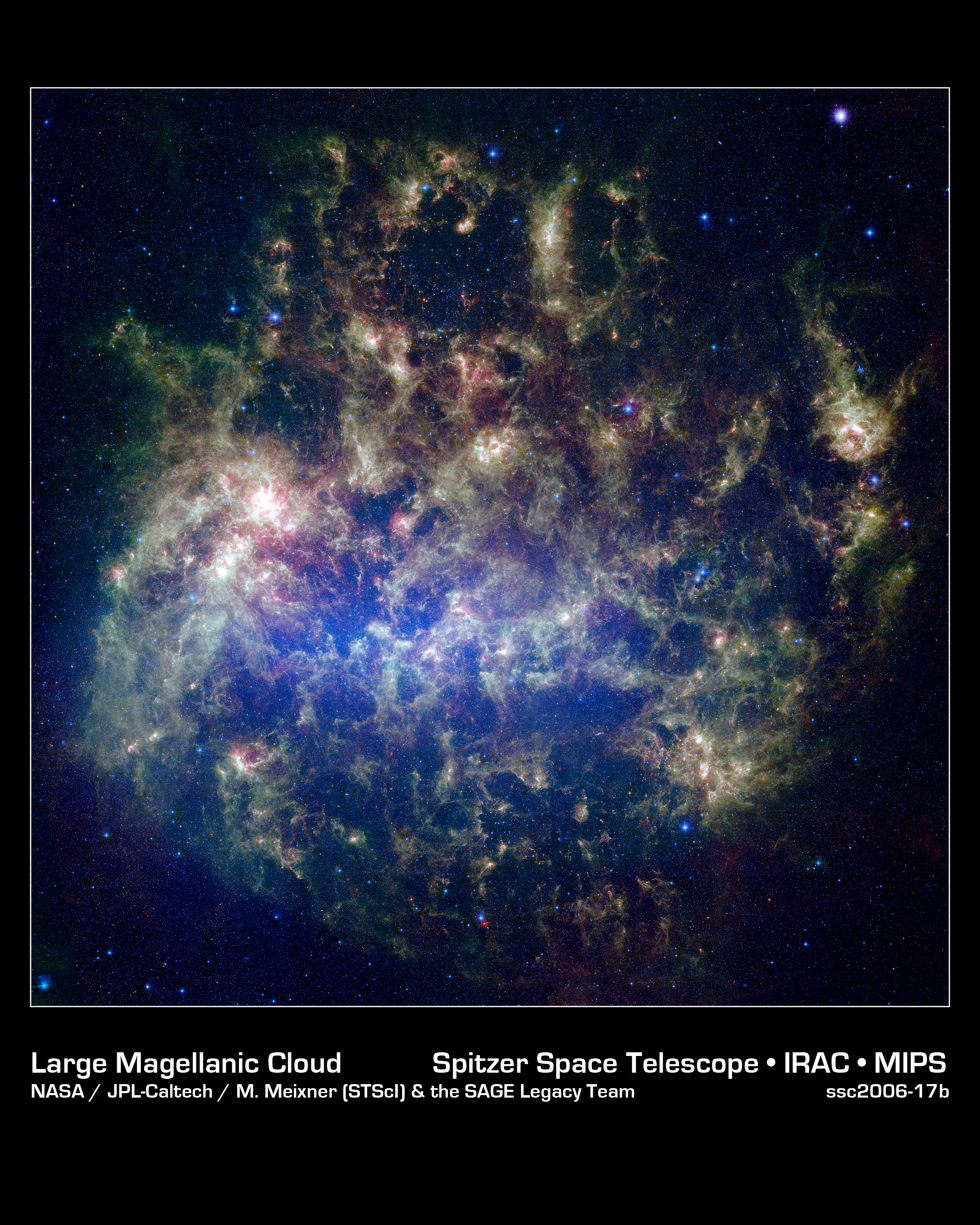
Large Magellanic Cloud, containing SNR N86.

In addition to his work as a legislator, Murphy also took a lifelong interest in science, having first studied science, then law, at the University of Sydney. Justice Michael Kirby identified Murphy's later scientific reading as "a positive influence on his approach to jurisprudence".

=== "Lionel Murphy SNR" ===
N86 is a nitrogen-abundant supernova remnant (SNR) N86 in the Large Magellanic Cloud. It was dubbed the "Lionel-Murphy SNR" by astronomers at the Australian National University's Mount Stromlo Observatory in acknowledgement of Murphy's interest in science and because of SNR N86's perceived resemblance to a Canberra Times cartoonist's depiction of his large nose (prior to surgery), and a picture was hung in his office.

A supernova remnant (SNR) results from the gigantic explosion of a star, the resulting supernova expelling much or all of the stellar material with velocities as much as 1% the speed of light and forming a shock wave that can heat the gas up to temperatures as high as 10 million K, forming a plasma.

Murphy normally rejected public honours (such as a knighthood) but accepted this because of the symbolic resemblance to his own impact on human rights in Australian law and its lasting significance as a "signpost" to space travellers. Murphy asked for a large mounted photo of SNR N86 from the scientific paper and placed it in his High Court chambers in the place where the other High Court justices usually hung a portrait of the Queen.

=== Lionel Murphy Foundation ===
The Lionel Murphy Foundation was co-founded by Gough Whitlam, Neville Wran, and Ray Gietzelt in 1986. It funds postgraduate scholarships for students who "intend to pursue a postgraduate degree in science, law or legal studies, or other appropriate discipline" with a commitment to social justice.

=== Judicial philosophy and legacy ===
Mary Gaudron, who herself would become a justice of the High Court, stated at Lionel Murphy's Memorial Service at Sydney Town Hall:

There are so many words – reformist, radical, humanitarian, civil libertarian, egalitarian, democrat — they are all abstractions. My words are no better; but, for me, and perhaps for those of us who believe in justice based on practical equality, Lionel Murphy was – Lionel Murphy is – the electric light of the Law. He would take an ordinary old abstraction – like equal justice — he would expose it, he would illuminate the abstraction, he would make its form stark, and so he could then say as he did in McInnis' case, these words: "Where the kind of trial a person receives depends on the amount of money he or she has, there is no equal justice."

Law professor Jack Goldring concluded that Murphy's approach as a High Court judge was "marked by a number of features: a strong nationalism conceding and welcoming the existence of States as political (albeit subsidiary) entities; a stalwart belief in democracy and parliamentary rule; a firm support for civil liberties; and overall a 'constitutionalism' in the classical, liberal sense of seeing a constitution as not simply a legal document, but rather as a set of values shared by the community".

== Books and a film on Lionel Murphy ==
- Lionel Murphy – a Political Biography
- Five Voices for Lionel
- In the Name of Lionel
- The Judgments of Lionel Murphy
- Justice Lionel Murphy
- Lionel Murphy: A Radical Judge
- FILM: Mr Neal is entitled to be an Agitator

== Bibliography ==
- Venturini, George, ed. (1994). Five voices for Lionel. Sydney: Federation Press. ISBN 1862871493.
- Blackshield, T. (2001). "Murphy affair". In Blackshield, Coper and Williams (ed.). The Oxford Companion to the High Court of Australia. Oxford University Press. ISBN 0-19-554022-0.
- Hocking, Jenny (1997). Lionel Murphy: a political biography. Cambridge University Press. ISBN 0-521-58108-7.
- Scutt, J. A., ed. (1987). Lionel Murphy, A Radical Judge. Melbourne: McCulloch Publishing. ISBN 0-949646-17-2.
- Williams, J. (2001). "Murphy, Lionel Keith". In Blackshield, Coper and Williams (ed.). The Oxford Companion to the High Court of Australia. Oxford University Press. ISBN 0-19-554022-0.

Political offices
Preceded by Gough Whitlam	Attorney-General of Australia; 1972–1975	Succeeded by Kep Enderby
Preceded by Gough Whitlam	Minister for Customs & Excise; 1972–1975	Succeeded by Kep Enderby
Party political offices
Preceded by Don Willesee	Leader of the Australian Labor Party in the Senate; 1967–1975	Succeeded by Ken Wriedt
