= Peter Kingston (artist) =

Australian artist (1943–2022)

- Born: 1943
- Died: 2022 (aged 78–79)
- Education: University of New South Wales (BA)
- Known for: Landscape painting
- Awards: Medal of the Order of Australia (OAM) (returned in 2021)

Peter Kingston (1943–2022) was an Australian artist and heritage activist, most known for his artworks depicting Sydney Harbour.

== Biography ==
Kingston grew up at Parsley Bay during the 1940s and 1950s. He attended the University of New South Wales and graduated with a Bachelor of Arts in 1965. He also tutored architecture at the University of Sydney.

Kingston fought to conserve the Walsh Bay wharves and was among the demonstrators that marched on Parliament in 1966 to demand the return of Jørn Utzon to build the Sydney Opera House.

In 1973, Kingston was commissioned alongside pop artists including Martin Sharp to restore and revitalise Luna Park Sydney. Following Luna Park's closure as a result of the Ghost Train fire, Kingston and Sharp founded the Friends of Luna Park, a group advocating for the conservation of the amusement park. When Luna Park was redeveloped in the early 1990s, Kingston was involved in the restoration of the Coney Island funhouse.

In 2013, Kingston was the recipient of the Medal of Australia for his activism and art. He returned the award in 2021 after Margaret Court's receiving of the Companion of the Order of Australia. Kingston stated the move was made in protest of Court's anti-LGBTQ advocacy.

Kingston resided in Lavender Bay for 50 years until his death. Much of his work depicted Sydney Harbour, primarily the view from his home.

Kingston died in September 2022 at the age of 79.
