= Agriculture (journal) =

Peer-reviewed open access scientific journal

- Discipline: Agriculture, agronomy, animal science, crop science, and soil science
- Language: English
- Edited by: Les Copeland

Publication details
- History: 2011–present
- Publisher: MDPI (Switzerland)
- Frequency: Semimonthly
- Open access: Yes
- License: Creative Commons Attribution License
- Impact factor: 3.6 (2024)

Standard abbreviations
- ISO 4: Agriculture

Indexing
- ISSN: 2077-0472

Links
- Journal homepage

Agriculture is a peer-reviewed open access scientific journal covering research across agricultural sciences. It is published by MDPI and was established in 2011. The Editor-in-Chief is Les Copeland (University of Sydney).

The journal publishes original research articles, reviews, communications, and short notes across topics such as crop and livestock production, agricultural systems and management, soils and water, agricultural technology, and rural development.

== Abstracting and indexing ==
The journal is indexed and abstracted in multiple services, including:

- Science Citation Index Expanded (SCIE)
- Scopus
- DOAJ
- ProQuest
- EBSCO

According to the Journal Citation Reports, the journal has a 2024 impact factor of 3.6.
