= Sydney Ghost Train fire =

1979 amusement park fire in Milson's Point, New South Wales, Australia

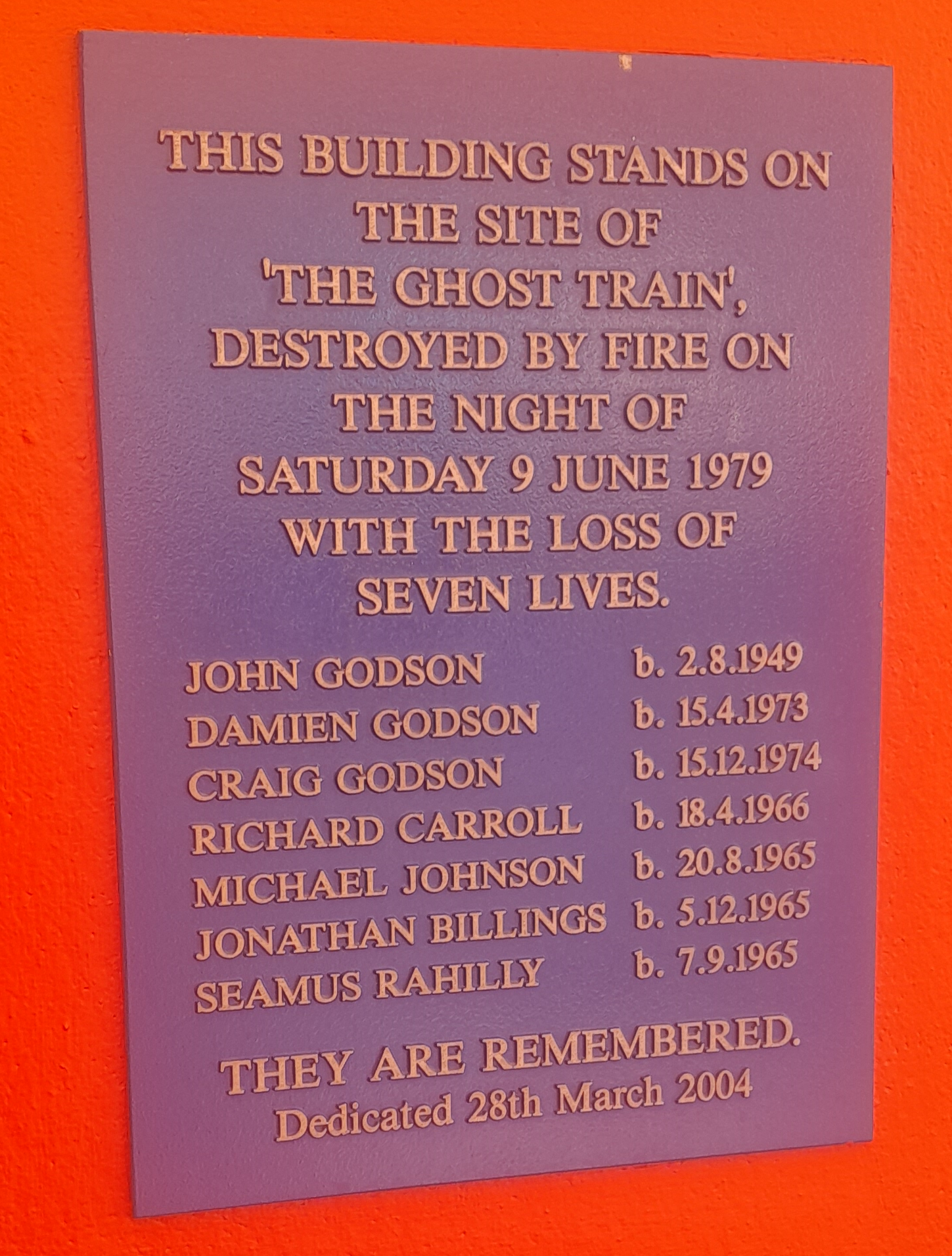
- Memorial plaque at Luna Park Sydney in remembrance of those who died in the fire
- Date: 9 June 1979
- Venue: Luna Park Sydney
- Location: Milsons Point, New South Wales, Australia; 33°50′54″S 151°12′35″E
- Type: Fire
- Cause: Cause disputed: Electrical fault (June 1979 NSW Police investigation); Inconclusive, probable ignition of flammable litter by patron's discarded cigarette or match (September 1979 NSW Coroner's Court); Arson (Australian Broadcasting Corporation investigation, 2021)
- Deaths: 7

The Sydney Ghost Train fire at Luna Park Sydney in Australia killed seven people (six children and one adult) and destroyed the ride on 9 June 1979. The fire was originally blamed on an electrical fault despite firefighter observations to the contrary. A 1979 coronial inquiry and mid-1980s investigation were inconclusive about the fire's cause.

Over the years there have been claims the true cause was arson ordered by Abe Saffron, and that NSW Police had covered it up. This conspiracy theory was perpetuated by park artist Martin Sharp, who spent over three decades amassing a large personal archive of documents relating to the fire, creating art inspired by the fire (including the unfinished film Street of Dreams) and advocating for new investigations into its cause, insisting it had been deliberately lit.

Since Saffron's death in 2006, two of his relatives have substantiated this theory. A 2021 Australian Broadcasting Corporation investigation featured testimony from numerous eyewitnesses consistent with arson. The ABC concluded that Saffron was responsible and that NSW Police had indeed conspired to cover up his involvement. Renewed interest since then has led to public demand for the case to be reopened. In late 2024, there were court hearings indicating the potential for a second coroner's inquest. As of 2026, it has been claimed by "anonymous police sources" that this is unlikely.

== Background ==
=== Ride ===
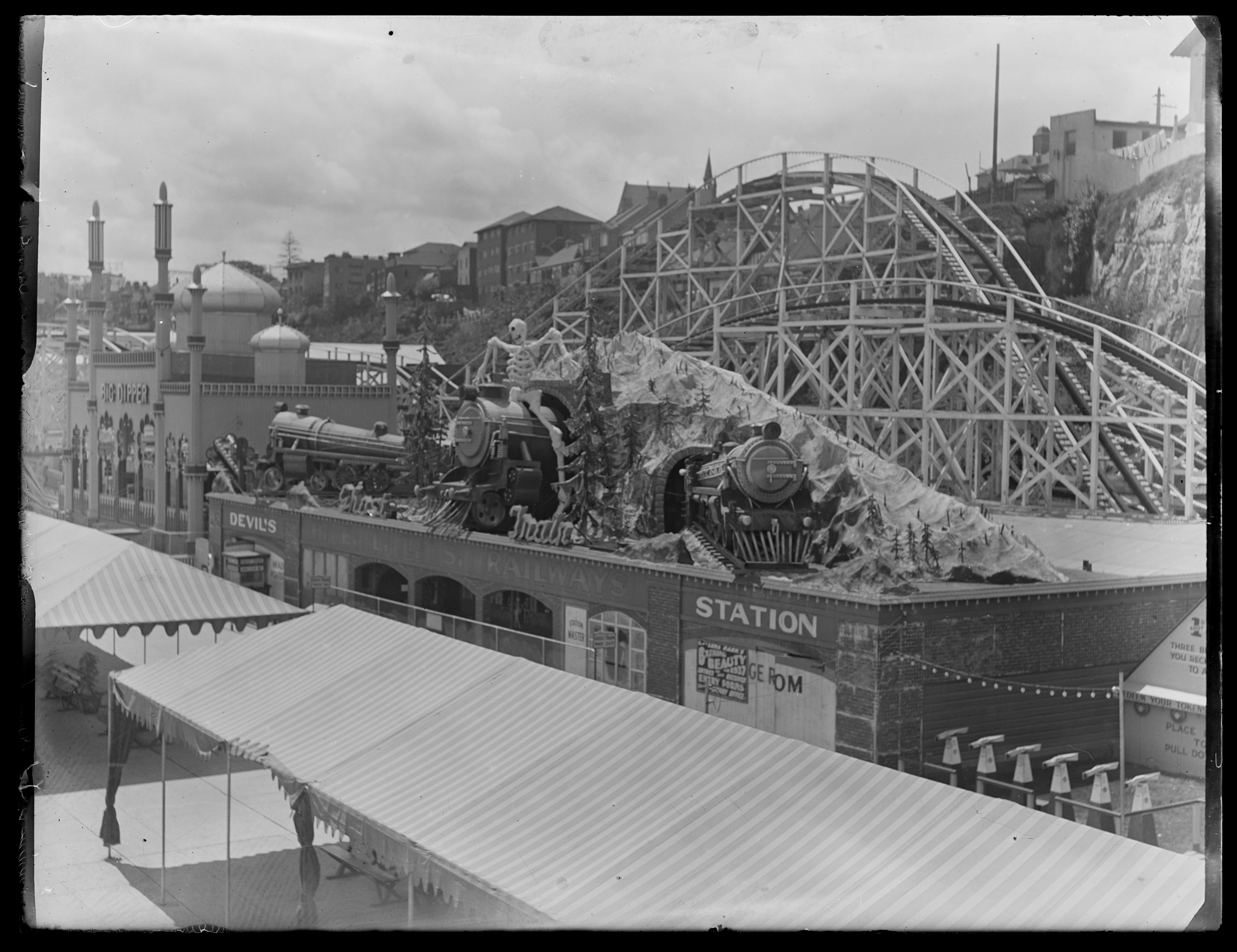
The Ghost Train, circa 1955

The Ghost Train was one of Luna Park's 1935 opening day attractions. Located between Big Dipper's station and the River Caves, the building housing it was originally built as a storeroom for equipment awaiting installation after arriving from Luna Park Glenelg. Architectural plans of the Ghost Train are held at the State Library of New South Wales.

The looped recording that attracted guests to the ride promised "the creepiest spine-tingling ride of your life", adding:

You'll shiver and quake... on the Ghost Train!

Cars would enter through a door reading "Hell's Doorway." Many twists and turns in pitch black then followed, yanking passengers along a 180-metre electric track. Most of the ride was pitch black. The ride was lined with dancing skeletons, an ape monster, a dragon's head, Dracula in a graveyard and a skeleton in a box. The ride also featured a fake fireplace which, according to witnesses, is where the actual fire originated.

=== Disputed lease ===
In the early 1970s, Luna Park was leased by the NSW government to property developers Leon Fink and Nathan Spatt. That lease expired in 1975, leaving Fink and Spatt paying $30,000 in rent annually. By 1979, plans were underway for a new 30-year lease to be drawn up for Fink and Spatt, although the specifics had been in dispute. Fink and Spatt were on good terms with NSW Premier Neville Wran until relations soured following a lunch at Wran's Woollahra mansion for reasons which are unclear - potentially involving comments Spatt made about the fit-out of Wran's house, criticism of Wran's use of a private jet or Fink and Spatt not donating enough money to the Australian Labor Party. Whatever the reason, Wran is said to have told Fink: "While my bum points to the ground, you and your partner won't get that place." Later developments would raise the possibility that underworld figure Abe Saffron wanted the lease, and it was later established that businesses connected to him were at least peripherally involved with the park. Wran's involvement has been disputed.

=== Martin Sharp park involvement ===
Artist Martin Sharp had been involved with Luna Park since being invited to redesign the face in 1973. Sharp was a passionate advocate for the park and was also fixated on the eccentric musician Tiny Tim, who played a ukulele and commanded a working knowledge of thousands of popular songs. In January 1979, Sharp brought Tiny to Australia to set the world record for the longest non-stop professional singing marathon in a concert at Luna Park. In April 1979, several children were injured when the park's Big Dipper roller coaster crashed. Sharp wrote a letter to Wran expressing concerns about safety at the park, but chose not to send it after a friend warned him the language was too strong.

== Fire ==
On the night of 9 June 1979, Jennifer and John Godson, and their two children Damien and Craig, were visiting Sydney on holiday from Warren in regional New South Wales. Before boarding a ferry to Luna Park at Circular Quay, a man dressed in a "loincloth and wearing a mask with horns" approached Damien Godson and said "Do you mind if I have my photo taken with your little boy?" then placed a hand on his shoulder. Jennifer Godson then took a photo, which ended up being the last of Damien while alive. The man has never been identified. While at Luna Park, the Godson children rode the Ghost Train once but insisted on going again. At around 10 pm, Jennifer decided to buy an ice cream but returned to find that Damien, Craig and John had all boarded the Ghost Train without her. Five students from Waverley College were also on the ride at that time—‌Jonathan Billings, Richard Carroll, Michael Johnson, Seamus Rahilly and Jason Holman—‌on a rare independent outing, having spent the earlier part of the day playing rugby and attending church.

Fire broke out inside the ride at approximately 10pm. Around thirty-five people were believed to have been on the ride when thick smoke began to escape from the tunnel doors. The fire began within an imitation fireplace that typically had paper "flames", which confused several of the riders. Once others realised the fire was real, they warned the ride operators who began to pull people from the ride as their cars exited the tunnel, including Holman.

The fire brigade were informed at 10:14 pm and left soon after. Their job on the night was made difficult for a number of reasons. Crews struggled to enter the park via the one road in and out while thousands of guests were evacuating. They then found that there was "no water pressure whatsoever" from the on-site hydrants and the hoses "leaked like sieves", which meant fire trucks had to be repositioned in order to drain water out of the harbour then set up a relay pump from one truck to the other. It was also necessary to set up lighting powered by generators, which took more time. The blaze was particularly ferocious as the Ghost Train was built of "highly combustible materials" and did not have an in-built sprinkler system. The fire spread to the "Toyland" area of the nearby River Caves before finally being put out at 11:17 pm, after more than an hour. It took even longer to cool the wreckage down enough to allow the fire crew to search inside.

At 11:30pm, the bodies of John, Damien and Craig Godson were discovered, apparently having left the cars to seek safety then having perished as the father attempted to shelter the children. Billings, Carroll, Johnson and Rahilly were also discovered in "another section." The surviving Jennifer Godson was left in immense shock at the sudden loss of her husband and children, and Holman found himself as the only survivor of the group of friends he went out with. Most of the ride was destroyed, leaving behind burnt-out cars and "a painting of a leering skeleton." While taking photos to document the scene, the crew also observed that the switchboard area was completely intact, meaning whatever caused the fire "wasn't consistent with an electrical fault."

Witnesses to the fire included park founder Ted Hopkins, Sharp, who arrived at Luna Park around 11 pm after receiving a call from Arkie Whiteley and watched the plumes of smoke from a distance, and future investigative reporter Kate McClymont. Fink arrived at the park later in the night, and claims to have been told by a police officer:

Let me just tell you this. Watch what you say, because if you don't watch what you say, you're going to be in trouble.

== Subsequent events ==
=== 1979–1984: Initial investigation, Abe Saffron rumours and Street of Dreams ===
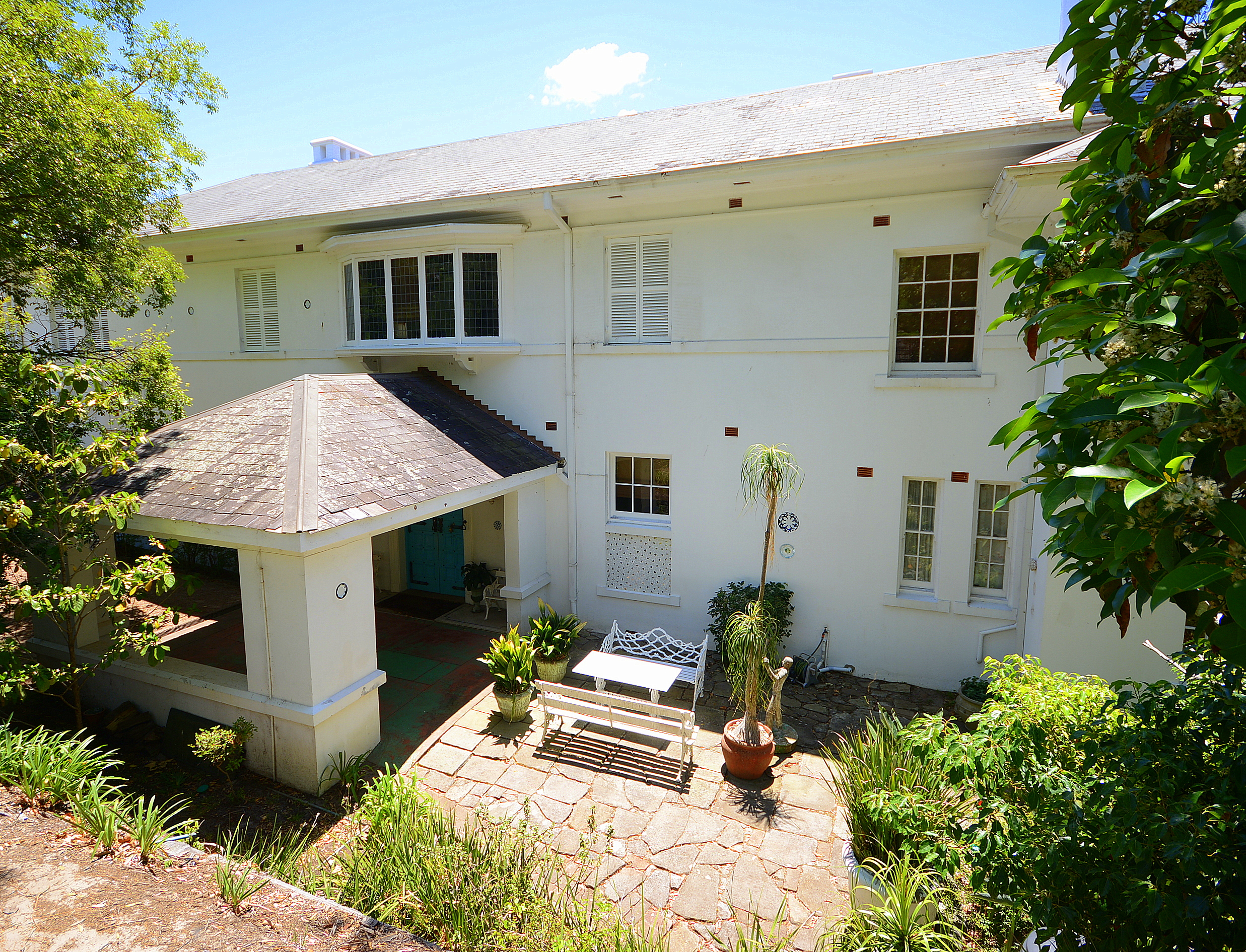
Martin Sharp's 'Wirian' residence, in which he amassed an entire room filled with research into the fire

The morning after the fire, Sharp delivered his unsent letter to Wran about safety concerns at the park. The fire was a major turning point in Sharp's life that would consume his artistic practice and activism for the next three decades.

Luna Park was shut down immediately after the fire for a federal investigation. The fire was initially blamed on an "electrical fault" by NSW Police, who immediately ruled out arson. It was also speculated that the seven dead may have survived had they stayed in the cars.

A memorial service for Carroll, Johnson, Billings and Rahilly organised by Waverley College was held at St. Mary's Cathedral on 15 June, attended by three to four thousand people plus thousands of others who lined the streets to pay their respects to the motorcade. Another service for the Godsons took place in Warren.

A Coroner's Court of New South Wales inquest began on 13 August 1979. Holman gave evidence and claimed that while he was waiting to go on the ride, a couple left while complaining of a "vile smell in there." Senior lecturer in electrical engineering A.D. Stokes also stated there was no evidence to support that an electrical fault was responsible. Around a quarter of the 80 witnesses who were called were dismissed without giving evidence. Decades later, it was publicly revealed several of those had described seeing "bikies" in the park on the night and smelling kerosene on the ride. Several of them also later claimed that they were coerced by police into changing their stories.

The results of the inquest were released in September. The Coroner concluded that the cause of the fire "cannot conclusively be stated", while accepting expert testimony that the ride's permanent wiring and attractions were unlikely to have been the source of ignition—‌though it could not be completely excluded. Having heard from witnesses that ride patrons often ignored no smoking signs and "had the habit of discarding food wrapping and other litter", Anderson stated that while "the most probable cause of the fire was ignition of flammable litter by a cigarette or match [...] discarded by a person riding on the train [...] how the fire was ignited, the evidence adduced does not allow me to say".

Anderson's inquiry examined issues beyond the source of ignition. He found that Luna Park's management had failed to develop an adequate fire suppression program despite recommendations by North Sydney Council and the fire department eighteen months earlier. Anderson's report stated that while the park's owners and management had failed in their duty of care towards patrons, the failure was not "that high degree of negligence necessary to support a charge of criminal negligence". The Government of New South Wales called for new tenders to operate the park on 31 July 1979. It was also revealed that a Sydney design consultant advised Luna Park management to install a sprinkler system in the Ghost Train in December 1977 but this recommendation was not followed. New legislation setting standards for fire egress across the state was passed in the inquest's aftermath.

Unsatisfied with the investigation's results, Sharp began to construct his own conspiracy theory of how the fire had occurred. Sharp discovered that Abe Saffron had unsuccessfully attempted to buy Luna Park from owner Ted Hopkins several years before the fire. Word then reached him from several people, including a park employee and someone with connections to Long Bay Correctional Centre, that Saffron had ordered the fire and the NSW Police had covered it up. Applying the Jungian concept of synchronicity, Sharp also began to document what he perceived as theological connections between Tiny Tim's performance and the fire. He then began work on Street of Dreams, a new documentary film that would cover all of these topics – the life of Tiny Tim, the history of Luna Park, Tiny Tim's performance there, the fire, Sharp's religious beliefs, the perceived theological connections between these topics and evidence that Saffron was responsible for the fire.

In 1980, photographer Michael Barker was working with the Friends and helping to document the park in its closed state. He was killed in a hit and run incident in November of that year. His brother John, also a photographer working with Sharp, then claimed to receive an anonymous phone call that said "stop going to Martin Sharp's, or you'll end up like your brother." That year a number of intruders also broke into the park, drawn by the notoriety of the Ghost Train site.

Luna Park faced an uncertain future for many years as a result of the fire, opening and closing several times. Throughout the 1980s, Sharp led a group called Friends of Luna Park who attempted to save the park from permanent closure and redevelopment. In 1984, Sharp curated an exhibition called Luna Images: The Face of Sydney at the Ivan Dougherty Gallery which included the name "Saffron" throughout various artworks. As Sharp's obsession with the fire escalated, he began to give equal weight to theological abstractions (such as instances of the number 666 in phone numbers, and the name Godson as "God-son") as more concrete evidence pertaining to the incident. He later told interviewers that he does not consider "one level more valid than another" and that he felt responsible for the fire, having been involved in the park's restoration: "We made the place look safe, using our artistic talents. I feel that the artists could see things going wrong and we should have contacted the right people."

=== 1985–1987: Second investigation ===
In the mid-1980s, an inquiry into the fire was held by the National Crime Authority. One witness claimed the fire was started by "a group of bikies working for an underworld figure who was trying to gain control of the park." It was also claimed by NSW MP Michael John Hatton that Saffron had beneficial ownership of the park. The inquiry also found that Harbourside Amusements, the company which leased the park in the aftermath of the fire, employed two of Saffron's cousins and one of his nephews. However, they concluded that this did not mean Saffron was directly linked to the park's ownership. The report stated:

There appears to be a determined effort to hide the true family and business involvement of Saffron in the company... If the matters contained in this report are found to support a strong inference of Saffron ownership or involvement in this company then the question of the Luna Park fire needs, I feel, to be addressed from a different perspective.

Overall, it was concluded that while no particular cause for the fire could be determined, the police investigation and coronial inquiry were ineffective and this "diminished the public's confidence in the justice system." The investigation also noted Sharp's involvement, noting that while his theories the fire was deliberately lit were "often extreme and eccentric", they were also "not without cause." That year Sharp also organised an exhibition in memory of those who perished in the fire. On opening night, he stood alongside Jennifer Poidevin (née Godson) as they both reiterated their belief the fire was deliberately lit and called for another investigation.

=== 1988–2004: "The Brighton Cut" and park reopening ===
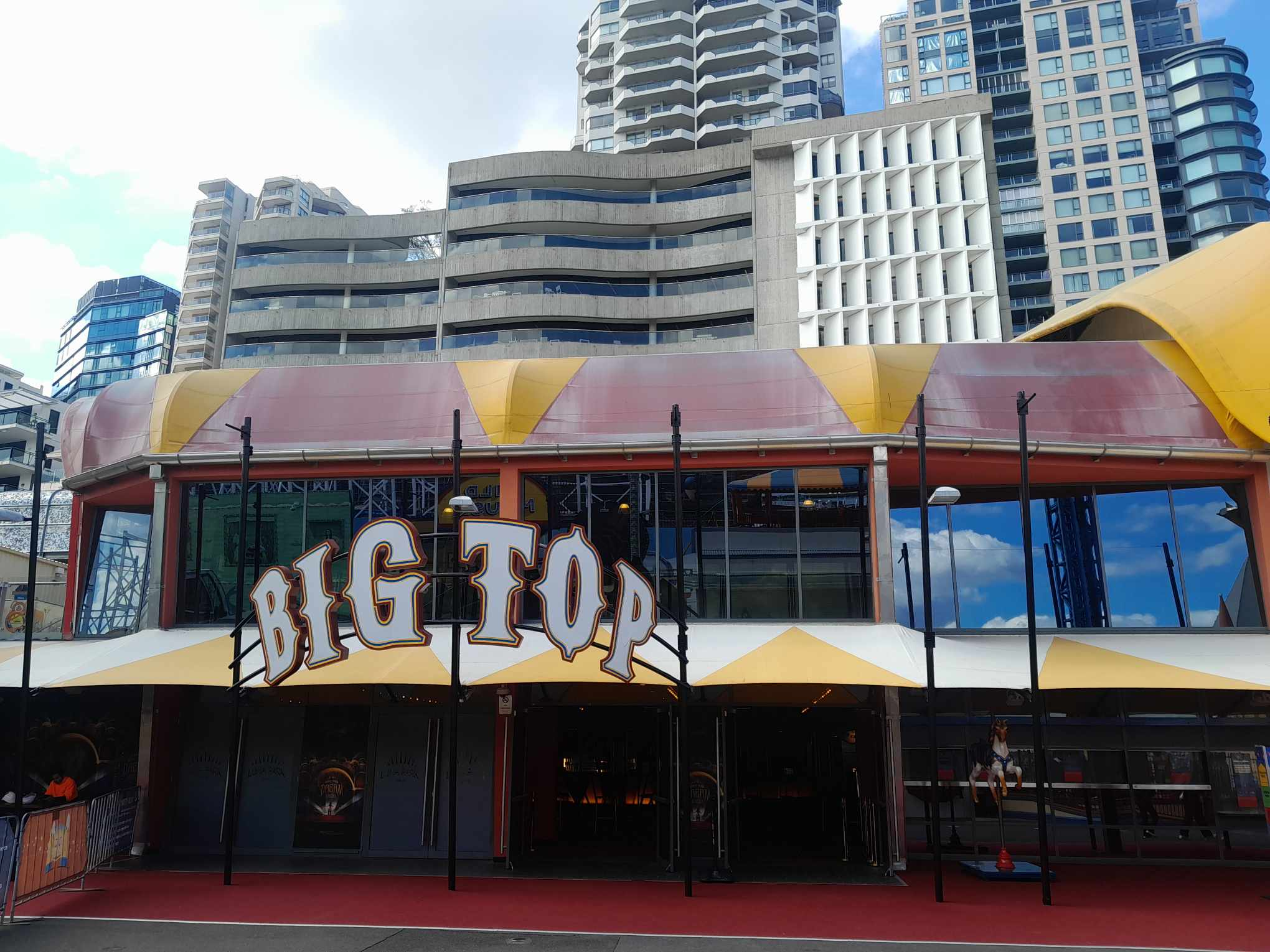
The Big Top venue at Luna Park today, which stands in place of the Ghost Train

In 1988, the "Brighton Cut" of Street of Dreams was compiled for film festival screenings in Brighton at Tiny's insistence, but Sharp still considered this version a work in progress and not a final product. He also continued advocating for Luna Park to remain open, telling The Sydney Morning Herald that "Luna Park is magic and fantasy and dreams. Luna Park belongs to Sydney; it is far more than private enterprise; it is an institution with a fascinating history and folklore of its own... it is Sydney, past, present and future."

In 1995, a memorial was dedicated to the seven victims of the 1979 fire, with a tree planted next to an antique bench displaying the names of the victims.

When Luna Park was redeveloped in 2003, the memorial tree was removed and the bench lost. Park director Warwick Doughty asserted that the memorial and events had little relevance, although North Sydney mayor Genia McCaffery, among others, disagreed and campaigned for the memorial to be reinstated.

After decades of struggle and several periods of closure, Luna Park Sydney reopened on a permanent basis in 2004, largely thanks to the successful efforts of Sharp and the Friends of Luna Park. The park is now protected by government legislation and cannot be developed for other purposes. In 2004, a plaque listing the names of the victims was placed on an external wall of the Big Top Sydney, which was constructed on the site of the Ghost Train. The plaque was intended to be the centrepiece of a mural painted by Sharp, but this did not eventuate.

=== 2006–2020: Death of Saffron and Sharp, claims of Saffron involvement and new memorial ===
Saffron died in 2006. In 2007, his niece Anne Buckingham implied in an interview with the Sydney Morning Herald that he was responsible for the fire. Saffron himself had denied this, despite being associated with seven other arson attacks in the late 1970s. According to Herald reporter Kate McClymont, Buckingham's exact words were:

Very strange, that fire. I don't think people were meant to be killed. It was more of a bad accident that was meant to be a warning. He wanted to collect things, and once he had them, he didn't care anymore.

Buckingham later publicly denied she made the comments attributed to her and demanded the story not be published. She privately told McClymont that while she did not actually deny anything that had been said, she wanted her comments withdrawn as she felt they would impact negatively on her chances to contest Saffron's will:

I don't want my name printed. I'm not in a position to, it is bad for my cause... I'm trying to get ahead in life, not behind. Once I get it sorted then I'll tell you everything. Nothing can be printed until I am set up and sorted. I don't want anything published with my name on it. You haven't paid for the interview.

Despite Buckingham's wishes, the article was published anyway on 26 May 2007. Saffron's son, Alan Saffron, claimed in response that the fire was a "straight-out accident."

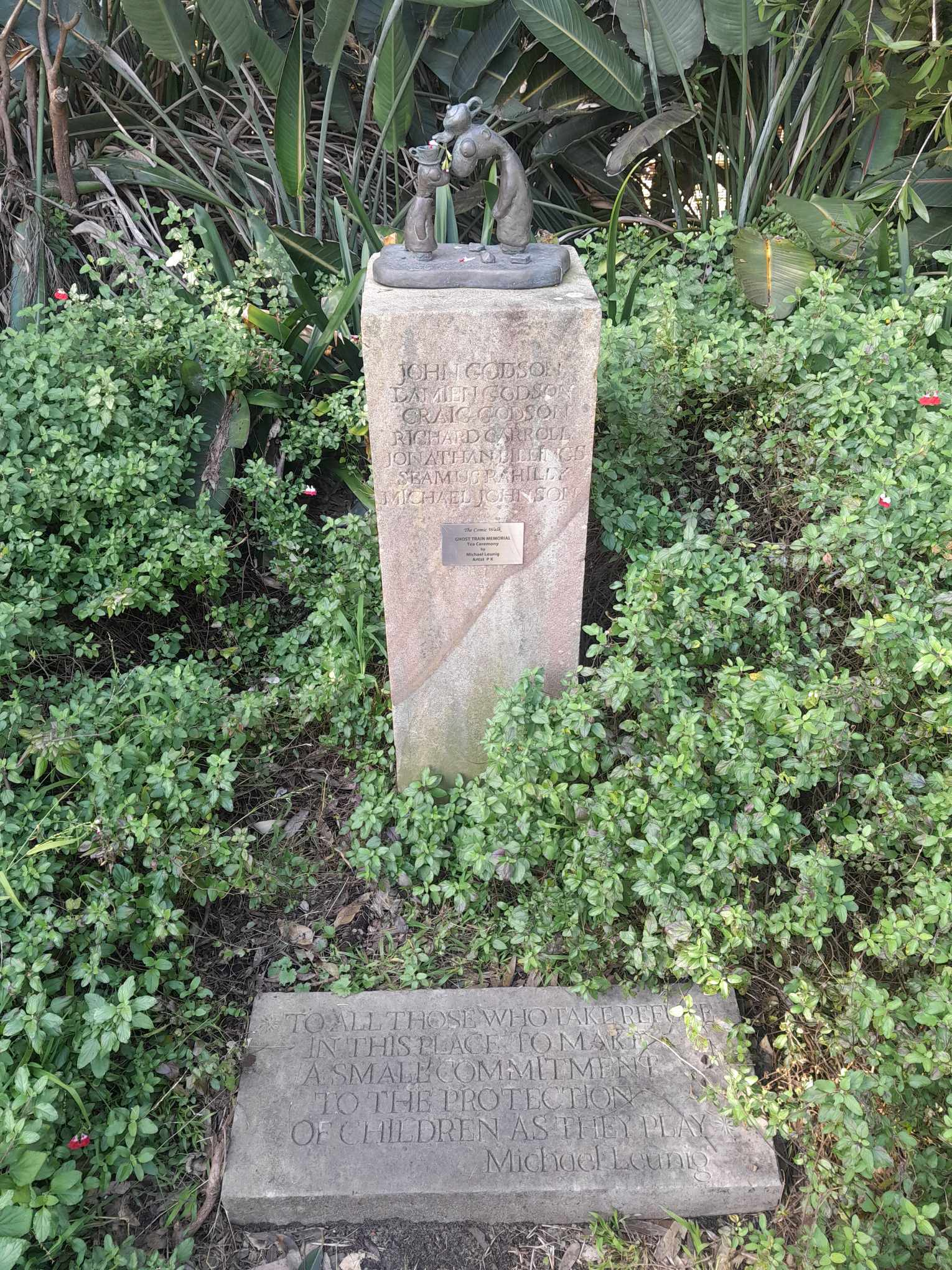
Memorial sculpture for the fire's victims, carved by Peter Kingston and based on an illustration by Michael Leunig

In August 2007, a series of small bronze sculptures were unveiled in Art Barton Park, which is just behind Luna Park and named after the park's original resident artist. Among them one dedicated to the fire's victims designed by Michael Leunig and carved by Peter Kingston. The pillar on which the sculpture stands is engraved with the names of those lost, and at the base of the pillar is a plaque reading: "To all those who take refuge in this place, to make a small commitment to the protection of children as they play." Another memorial stands in the form of plaques with names and photos of the lost children at Waverley College.

In 2008, Alan Saffron published his autobiography, Gentle Satan: My Father, Abe Saffron, in which he described the fire as an accident and added that "there was no motive for such an act—‌my father believed he was already set to gain control of the lease of the park, as it had been promised to him by a high-ranking government official, who I'm regrettably unable to name for legal reasons."

In 2010, Sharp discussed the fire's impact on his spiritual outlook with Radio National, connecting it to a passage in the book of Jeremiah which refers to the "worship of Moloch [...] [and] the Canaanite sacrifice of the first-born children by passing them through the fire":

[The fire was] a major religious event in the history of Sydney, if not wider [...] I think that's absolutely what it was and Moloch's sacrifice was made as far as I can tell from the history of it, was made of children into the fire to bring power to the king. Fun-fairs are Molochian temples disguised to pass into the modern world as an amusement, or an entertainment, but at certain times they fulfil their destiny and become the scenes of such tragedies. It's not unique of course, this fire at Luna Park in the history of fun-fairs and deaths in the ghost houses. There seem to be scenes of where the deaths occur. That sort of inherent sort of creepiness you do feel about some fun-fairs and the sort of canned laughter of clowns and false fun of these places, ultimately. Which I fell for in the beginning, that's for sure. I loved Luna Park, and River Caves, and there was great charm there and inventiveness. But it was a Moloch Temple disguised as a fun fair.

Sharp died in 2013. Street of Dreams remains unfinished and has never been officially released on home video in any form, though the Brighton Cut has surfaced online as a low-quality bootleg.

In 2020, Alan Saffron died in Texas. Despite Alan's previous claims of his father's innocence, his widow Genevieve Saffron then claimed to be in possession of documents that contained information tying Abe to the Ghost Train fire and the murder of Juanita Nielsen. She told The Saturday Telegraph that she intended to release those documents because Alan wanted closure for the victims, so they could "know the truth about what happened." Genevieve added that Abe "was not a good man, and did some things he should not have done [...] I want the facts to be revealed but I don't have the stamina right now." The "documents" in question have also been described elsewhere as Abe's "diaries", which Alan is said to have claimed are "locked in the safe of Angus and Robertson, publishers, and marked ‘never to be released’ until I die, because I would fear for my own life."

=== 2021: Exposed: The Ghost Train Fire ===
In March 2021, Australia's national broadcaster, the Australian Broadcasting Corporation (ABC), screened a three-part investigative series by journalist Caro Meldrum-Hanna, Exposed: The Ghost Train Fire. The series interviewed a number of eyewitnesses, several of whom went public for the first time claiming they saw the fire being deliberately lit by "bikies" and that they were coerced by police at the time into changing their statement.

The program also brought to light much of Sharp's personal collection of files and taped interviews gathered during his own investigation of the incident over the years, as collected in the "Ghost Train Room" of his Wirian residence, described as "an extraordinary archive of thousands of documents: court records, government reports, newspaper clippings and photographs together with hundreds of hours of cassette tape recordings, which were stories about the fire he had taped off the radio, plus conversations with, and musings by, people who had information and theories about the cause of the fire." However, Exposed did not discuss Street of Dreams nor Sharp's theological perspectives on the fire.

Exposed concluded that Saffron was responsible for the fire, and that a web of criminality connected him, Detective Inspector Doug Knight, former NSW Premier Neville Wran and former High Court Justice Lionel Murphy. It was alleged that Saffron ordered the setting of the fire by an outlaw motorcycle club so he could gain control of the lease on the crown land (public land protected by the government of New South Wales) on which Luna Park stood. The "fresh claims of foul play and a cover-up" in the television program led to a call by Jodi McKay, then-leader of the NSW official opposition, for the government to instigate a new coronial inquiry or Royal Commission into the case.

=== 2021–2026: Aftermath of Exposed and potential second inquest ===
The allegations against Wran were criticised by former premiers Bob Carr and Barrie Unsworth, former prime minister Malcolm Turnbull, former ABC managing director David Hill, and former Sydney Morning Herald editor Milton Cockburn. This resulted in the ABC Board establishing an enquiry into the programme. In their report, Professor Rodney Tiffin and journalist Chris Masters supported the program's overall thesis with the caveat that the allegations against Wran were overstated. They concluded that "the program makers uncovered much suspicious evidence around arson being the cause of the fire, exposed the incompetence of the police investigation, reported on the inadequacies of earlier investigations, revealed the way policy making by the NSW government benefited Saffron, and the corrupt circle of influence around Saffron. They mounted a compelling case for a new investigation."

"Ultimately, justice is always done."

— Martin Sharp

In April 2021, following the release of Exposed: The Ghost Train Fire and the subsequent public outcry, New South Wales Premier Gladys Berejiklian said that "relevant agencies in NSW are considering [a fresh inquest]". At the request of New South Wales state coroner Teresa O'Sullivan, the NSW Police Force reopened their investigation and its homicide division established Strike Force Sedgeman to conduct the review. A reward of AUD $1 million for 'fresh and significant information' was offered but none was forthcoming.

Meldrum-Hanna left the ABC in 2023 for unknown reasons and has kept out of the public eye ever since.

On 11 January 2023, Strike Force Sedgeman completed their review and provided their report to the Coroner. In October 2024, a redacted version of the report was made available to family members of victims as well as relevant counsel. O'Sullivan stated she would review the report in making a decision as to whether or not a second inquest will be held, and requested that it not yet be released to the public or the media. Mary and Tony Carroll, parents of deceased Richard, have read the report and feel it to be a thorough account of events; neither believe another inquest would be worthwhile for them personally. As at October 2026 the Coroner has still made no decision about a new inquest or released the redacted report of Strike Force Sedgeman.

In 2024, former Sydney Morning Herald editor Milton Cockburn published The Assassination of Neville Wran, defending Wran's reputation and disputing his involvement in the Ghost Train fire saga.

In 2025, Stuart Coupe published a biography of Saffron that concluded that while some evidence exists of his possible involvement with the Ghost Train fire, it is also not currently possible to directly and conclusively link him to it. In 2026, Helen Pitt published a book about the history of Luna Park Sydney entitled Luna Park, which cited "anonymous police sources" as claiming that "it is unlikely enough evidence has been unearthed to reopen a coronial enquiry." Pitt also stated that a number of relevant witnesses were not spoken to at all by Strike Force Sedgeman, including fireman Peter Little, reporter Paul Molloy, park employee Peter Unley and numerous others who were featured in Exposed.

There are plans to paint an "Eternity" mural in the style of Arthur Stace and Sharp near the current Ghost Train memorial plaque. In August 2026, Wirian was put up for sale despite Sharp's dying "hopes of creating a place for artists." The Ghost Train Room has now been cleared out, and Sharp's archive of research into the fire has been donated to the State Library of New South Wales.

== See also ==
- List of disasters in Australia by death toll
