= Peter Rutledge =

New Zealand chemist

Peter J. Rutledge
- Citizenship: Australian New Zealand
- Education: University of Auckland; University of Oxford
- Scientific career
- Fields: Organic chemistry Drug discovery
- Workplaces: Magdalen College, Oxford; Somerville College, Oxford; University of Oxford; University College Dublin; University of Sydney
- Doctoral advisor: Jack Edward Baldwin
- Website: Rutledge Research Group

Peter Jonathan Rutledge is a New Zealand chemist and professor at the School of Chemistry, University of Sydney. His research has focused on drug development for tuberculosis, antibiotics, and metal sensing. He has engaged in some research activity on catalysis.

== Education ==
Rutledge received his BSc in chemistry and biochemistry from the University of Auckland in 1993. He received his MSc from the same institution with first class honours in chemistry in 1995. He left New Zealand in 1995 and obtained his DPhil at Magdalen College, Oxford working with Jack Edward Baldwin in 1999. He was a postdoctoral research fellow at the same institution until 2003.

== Career and research ==
Rutledge has held college lectureships at Magdalen College, Oxford, from 2000 to 2001 and Somerville College, Oxford, from 2001 to 2002. In 2003, he moved to become a lecturer at the Centre for Synthesis and Chemical Biology at University College Dublin. In 2006, he relocated to the University of Sydney and was an associate professor during the years 2014 to 2019. In 2019, he was promoted to a full professor of chemistry. At the University of Sydney, Rutledge regularly collaborated with the group of Matthew H. Todd until his departure to University College London in 2018.

== Honours and awards ==
- 2012 – Pearson Education RACI Centenary of Federation Chemistry Educator of the Year Award
- 2011 – Vice-Chancellor's Award for Outstanding Teaching
- 2011 – Australian Learning and Teaching Council Citation for Teaching Excellence
- 2010 – Vice-Chancellor's Award for Support of the Student Experience
- 2008 – NSW and ACT Young Tall Poppy Science Award
- 2007 – RACI Athel Beckwith Lectureship
- 2006 – RACI Nyholm Lectureship
