= David Paver Mellor =

Australian chemist (1903–1980)

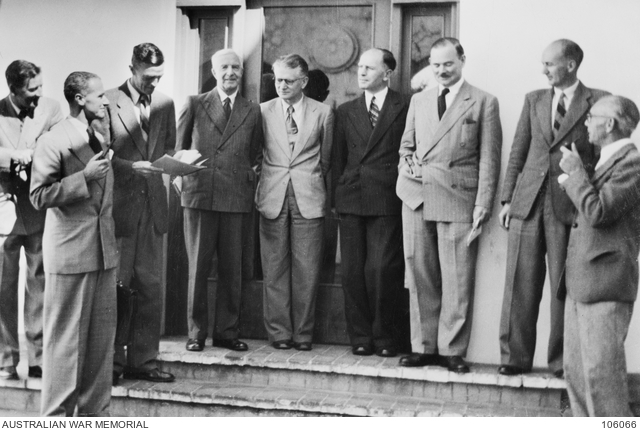
- A group photo of the authors of Australia in the War of 1939–1945 in 1957. Mellor is in the centre, wearing glasses
- Born: 19 March 1903; Launceston, Tasmania, Australia
- Died: 9 January 1980 (aged 76); North Sydney, New South Wales, Australia
- Education: University of Tasmania
- Known for: The Role of Science and Industry
- Awards: H. G. Smith Medal (1949); Royal Society of New South Wales Medal (1954); Dwyer Memorial Medal (1969); Leighton Medal (1975)
- Scientific career
- Fields: Inorganic chemistry
- Workplaces: University of Sydney; University of New South Wales

David Paver Mellor (19 March 1903 – 9 January 1980) was an Australian inorganic chemist. A graduate of the University of Tasmania, he was a lecturer and reader at the University of Sydney from 1929 to 1955, and was the Professor of Inorganic Chemistry at the University of New South Wales from 1955 to 1969. He researched on the properties and structures of coordination complexes. He was the author of The Role of Science and Industry, a volume in the official history series Australia in the War of 1939–1945. This volume broke new ground in Australian military history in dealing with the development and acquisition of military equipment.

== Early life ==
David Paver Mellor was born in Launceston, Tasmania, on 19 March 1903, the oldest of the four children of Joseph Frederick William Mellor, a miner, and his wife Amy Florence Sarah née Russell. He attended Launceston State High School and then entered the University of Tasmania, from which he graduated with a Bachelor of Science degree in 1926.

Mellor joined the Electrolytic Zinc Company as a chemist, and became the company's research scholar in 1927. The following year he became a research fellow at the Commonwealth Solar Observatory on Mount Stromlo in Canberra and earned his Master of Science degree from the University of Tasmania. In 1929, he accepted an appointment as an assistant-lecturer in chemistry at the University of Sydney. He married Nina Hilda Moses, a kindergarten teacher, at St Chad's Anglican Church in Cremorne Point in Sydney on 17 August 1929. They had two daughters.

== Chemist ==
Mellor remained at the University of Sydney until 1955, although in 1938 he was a research fellow at the California Institute of Technology, where he conducted research under Linus Pauling. His research there resulted in two papers on crystallography that were published in the Zeitschrift für Kristallographie. Mellor's main research interests centred on the properties and structures of coordination complexes. He served as the president of the Sydney University Chemical Society and was the president of the Royal Society of New South Wales in 1941. He was awarded a Doctor of Science degree by the University of Tasmania in 1945, and was promoted to reader at the University of Sydney in 1948.

In 1955, Mellor became the Professor of Inorganic Chemistry at the New South Wales University of Technology, which was renamed the University of New South Wales in 1958. He became the head of the school of chemistry in 1956 and the dean of the faculty of science in 1968. He was chief examiner for the Leaving certificate in chemistry and chief examiner for the Higher School Certificate in science. He was also a member of the Secondary Schools Board, the council of the University of New South Wales and the interim council of Macquarie University.

== Historian ==
In addition to his scientific work, Mellor wrote The Role of Science and Industry (1958) was a volume in the official history series Australia in the War of 1939–1945. This book broke new ground in Australian military history in dealing with the development and acquisition of military equipment, although it was criticised for hewing too closely to the views of senior figures, most notably the Deputy Master General of the Ordnance, John O'Brien. In the preface, Mellor wrote:

This volume is intended to be an account, intelligible to the general reader, of the part played by science and industry in the defence of Australia during the war of 1939-45. Of necessity it must cover a range of subjects so wide that to do them justice would require almost as many writers as there are chapters. Expert knowledge of the diverse subjects that a volume such as this must attempt to cover is beyond the competence of any one person. Many scientists find it difficult enough to write about their own special subjects in a way that will be intelligible to the layman. To attempt to deal in this way with subjects outside one's special fields is still more difficult.

Mellor also wrote a book on The Evolution of the Atomic Theory (1971), co-edited Chelating Agents and Metal Chelates (1964) with Frank Dwyer, becoming the sole editor after Dwyer's death, and contributed to the Australian Dictionary of Biography between 1967 and 1977. He retired in 1969 and lived in the Sydney suburb of Lindfield.

== Death and legacy ==
Among the honours and awards he received for his work was the Royal Australian Chemical Institute's H. G. Smith medal in 1949, the Royal Society of New South Wales medal in 1954, the University of New South Wales Chemical Society's Dwyer memorial medal in 1969 and the Royal Australian Chemical Institute's Leighton medal in 1975. He delivered the Royal Society of New South Wales' Archibald Liversidge Lecture in 1951, and the inaugural Kurth Memorial Lecturer at the University of Tasmania in 1977, with a lecture on "Serendipity in Chemistry".

Mellor died at Royal North Shore Hospital on 9 January 1980 and his remains were cremated. He is commemorated at the University of New South Wales by the Mellor Lecture and Medal for Chemical Education and the Mellor Lecture Theatre in the School of Chemistry.

== Publications ==
- Mellor, D.P. (1939). "The Unit Cell and Probable Space Group of Strontium Hydroxide Octahydrate, Sr(OH)2.8H2O". Zeitschrift für Kristallographie, Kristallgeometrie, Kristallphysik, Kristallchemie. 100: 441–442.
- Mellor, D.P. (1939). "The unit cell and space group of Cs2CuCl4". Zeitschrift für Kristallographie, Kristallgeometrie, Kristallphysik, Kristallchemie. 101 (1–6): 160–161. doi:10.1524/ZKRI.1939.101.1.160.
- Dwyer, F. P.; Mellor, D.P. (January 1941). "The Diamagnetism of Nickel Triazene Complexes". Journal of the American Chemical Society. 63 (1): 81–83. Bibcode:1941JAChS..63...81D. doi:10.1021/JA01846A013. ISSN 0002-7863.
- Mellor, D.P. (1942). "Obituary: Richard Thomas Baker". Journal and Proceedings of the Royal Society of New South Wales. 76. ISSN 0035-9173.
- Hughes, G. K.; Hush, N.; Mellor, D. P. (May 1947). "Polymerization of a Semiquinone Ion". Nature. 159 (4044): 612. Bibcode:1947Natur.159..612H. doi:10.1038/159612B0. ISSN 0028-0836.
- Maley, L.; Mellor, D.P. (1949). "The Relative Stability of Internal Metal Complexes: I Complexes of 8-hydroxyquinoline, Salicylaldehyde and Acetylacetone". Australian Journal of Scientific Research B. 2 (1): 92–110. Bibcode:1949AuSRA...2...92M. doi:10.1071/CH9490092. ISSN 0365-365X.
- Maley, L.; Mellor, D.P. (1949). "The Relative Stability of Internal Metal Complexes: Ii Metal Derivatives of 8-hydroxyquinoline 5-sulphonic Acid and a Series of Monocarboxylic Mono-a-amino Acids Including Histidine". Australian Journal of Scientific Research B. 2 (4): 579–594. doi:10.1071/CH9490579. ISSN 0365-365X.
- Maley, L.; Mellor, D. P. (1950). "Stability of Some Metal Complexes of Histidine". Nature. 165 (4194): 453. Bibcode:1950Natur.165..453M. doi:10.1038/165453A0. ISSN 0028-0836.
- Dwyer, F. P.; Lions, F.; Mellor, D. P. (November 1950). "Sexadentate Metal Complexes: II Magnetic Studies". Journal of the American Chemical Society. 72 (11): 5037–5039. Bibcode:1950JAChS..72.5037D. doi:10.1021/JA01167A059. ISSN 0002-7863.
- Mellor, D. P. (August 1957). "Founders of Australian Chemistry. Archibald Liversidge". Proceedings of the Royal Australian Chemical Institute. 24. ISSN 0035-8746.
- Mellor, D.P. (1958). The Role of Science and Technology. Australia in the War of 1939–1945: Series 4 (Civil). Vol. V. Canberra: Australian War Memorial.
- Mellor, D. P. (1960). "H. G. Smith. A Pioneer in Australian Phytochemistry". Proceedings of the Royal Australian Chemical Institute. 27. ISSN 0035-8746.
- Mellor, D. P.; Dwyer, Francis, eds. (1964). Chelating Agents and Metal Chelates. New York: Academic Press. OCLC 543231.
- Mellor, D. P. (1971). The Evolution of the Atomic Theory. Amsterdam: Elsevier. ISBN 978-0-444-40886-0. OCLC 240521.
- Mellor, D. P. (1972). "Ronald Sidney Nyholm (1917–1971): Obituary". Search. 3 (11/12).
- Mellor, D. P. (1976). "The Development of Coordination Chemistry in Australia". Records of the Australian Academy of Science. 3 (2): 29–40. doi:10.1071/HR9760320029. ISSN 0067-155X.
