= S* =

International collaboration of universities

S* (pronounced "S Star") is the diminutive for the S* Life Science Informatics Alliance, a collaboration between seven universities and the Karolinska Institutet of Sweden, and its course, the S-Star Bioinformatics Online course. The goal is to provide course material for training in bioinformatics and genomics.

== Member institutions ==
The following institutions are members of the S* Life Science Informatics Alliance:

- Macquarie University, Sydney, Australia
- University of Sydney (School of Molecular Bioscience), Australia (as of 2001)
- Karolinska Institutet, Sweden (as of 2001)
- University of Uppsala, Sweden (as of 2001)
- National University of Singapore, Singapore (as of 2001)
- University of the Western Cape, South Africa (as of 2001)
- Stanford University, United States (as of 2001)
- University of California, San Diego, United States, via the San Diego Supercomputer Center (as of 2002)
