= Street of Dreams (Martin Sharp film) =

Unfinished documentary on Tiny Tim, Luna Park Sydney and the 1979 Ghost Train Fire

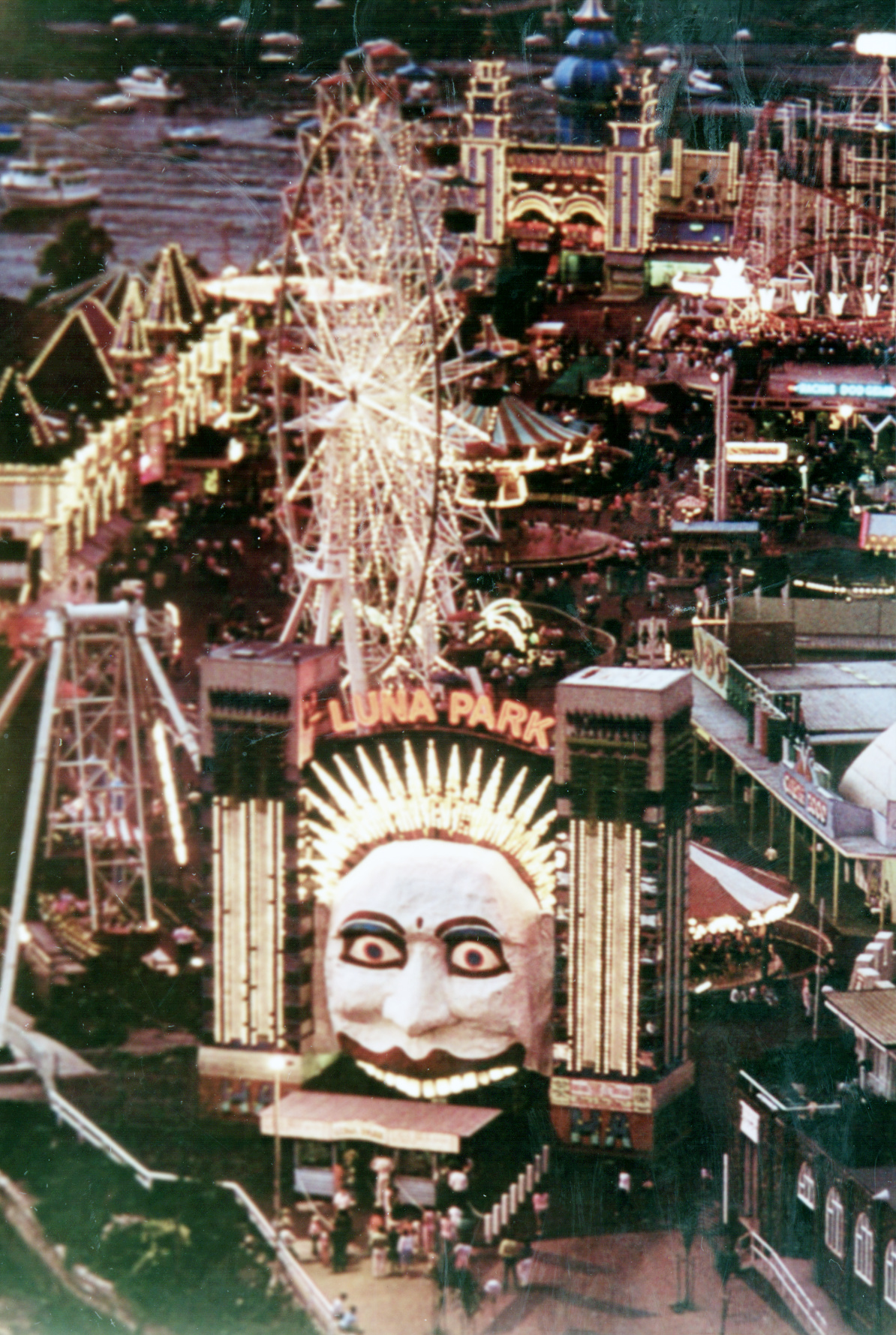
- Directed by: Martin Sharp
- Produced by: Martin Sharp, Deanne Judson, Jo Sharp
- Starring: Tiny Tim
- Edited by: Paul Healy, Marilyn Karet
- Running time: 107 minutes (Brighton Cut)
- Countries: Australia; United States
- Language: English

Street of Dreams is an unfinished documentary film about the musician Tiny Tim and the 1979 Ghost Train fire at Luna Park Sydney, directed and produced by Australian artist Martin Sharp.

== Themes and content ==
The film first features Tiny Tim, showcasing footage of his record-setting, two-hour-and-seventeen-minute professional singing marathon at Luna Park Sydney in January 1979. It tells Tiny's life story, framed around the marathon performance footage, while highlighting his many eccentricities, religious convictions and sexual hangups as captured by Sharp's camera crews in both Australia and the United States.

The film's other major theme is the 1979 Ghost Train fire at Luna Park, which occurred five months after Tiny's visit. Sharp became convinced the two events were somehow linked, and so the film covers the perceived synchronicities and theological underpinnings of the fire while also telling the story of Luna Park in general. As filming went on, Sharp also began to gather evidence, also presented in the film, that the fire was not an accident as had been originally reported but was in fact deliberately lit by associates of Abe Saffron.

Street of Dreams explores all of the above themes – Tiny, the marathon performance, his life in general, the Ghost Train fire, potential causes of the fire and the history of Luna Park in general – in an interconnected, theological way, with heavy Christian motifs and joined by a narrative in which Tiny makes his way through the park's mirror maze.

== Post-production and incomplete status ==
Sharp originally asked Peter Weir to make a film about Tiny Tim, but ultimately Weir turned him down saying that Sharp should make the film himself. Sharp obsessively worked on Street of Dreams after 1979, mortgaging his Wirian residence several times to pay for it. By 1985, an entire room of his Wirian residence was dedicated to the project, which Sharp had custom painted in shades of blue, yellow and pink.

In 1988, a rough version entitled "The Brighton Cut" was compiled at Tiny's insistence so that the film could be shown at the Brighton Festival, with Tiny commenting that Sharp had "maybe made a cult movie which at the very least will survive as a museum piece". This version was played at various other film festivals in the late 1980s and early 1990s and occasionally aired on TV in both Australia and the United States though Sharp still considered it a work in progress.

In 1989, Sharp told James Cockington of the Sydney Morning Herald: "I think I've got the form there now. It's just a matter of making what's between the beginning and the end flow a bit better". In the same joint interview, Tiny also suggested that the film should centre more on Luna Park and that "more concentration should be held on the nude scenes... (they) should last longer and be heavier". In 1990, Sharp spoke with Nikki Barroclough of the Herald, saying: "People have often said it's two separate films, but I think the challenge is to make it one film. When it's ready, it will let me know. If the worst comes to worst, it will stand as it is now."

Sharp continued to work on the film up until his death in 2013 and never finished it. As of 2024 his estate continue to consider it an incomplete work and have never released it officially, although poor-quality bootleg copies of the Brighton Cut from a VHS transfer circulate online.

In 2014, footage of Tiny's complete Luna Park marathon performance shot for Street of Dreams was released on streaming services as The Non-Stop Luna Park Marathon by Planet Blue Pictures. As of 2023, it can be viewed for free on Vimeo.

== Selected cast ==
- Pleasure Aims
- Dave Ellis
- Doug Gallagher
- Jennifer Godson
- David Gulpilil
- Ted Hopkins
- Don Lane
- Jeannie Lewis
- Marvin Lewis
- Philippe Petit
- Adrian Rawlins
- S. John Ross
- Martin Sharp
- Tillie Staff
- Tiny Tim
- Nathan Waks

== Songs performed by Tiny Tim ==
As per the Brighton Cut.

- "Street of Dreams"
- "The Harbor of Love"
- "Love's Ship"
- "Welcome to My Dream"
- "There'll Always Be An England"
- "Lonely Troubadour"
- "M-O-T-H-E-R (The Word That Means the World to Me)"
- "The Hukilau Song"
- "Makin' Whoopee"
- "Delilah"
- "When You and I Were Seventeen"
- "Harbour Lights"
- "Stardust"
- "Mickey Mouse March"
- "Leave Me Satisfied"
- "You Stepped Out of a Dream"
- "The Great Pretender"
- "Forever Miss Dixie"
- "Take Me Out to Luna Park"
- "Heartbreak Hotel"
- "Don't Go in the Lion's Cage Tonight"
- "Mother Macree"
- "As You Desire Me"
- "Highway to Hell"
- "The Wind in the Willows"
- "The Other Side"
- "My Lighthouse"
- "(There'll Be Bluebirds Over) The White Cliffs of Dover"
- "Down Under"

=== Selections from the Luna Park Marathon ===
- "My Name is Mr. Phonograph"
- "Goody Goody"
- "It's a Good Day"
- "Don't Sit Under the Apple Tree"
- "I'm Beginning to See the Light"
- "Shine On, Harvest Moon"
- "The Last Mile of the Way"
- "My Melancholy Baby"
- "Pennies from Heaven"
- "Comin' In on a Wing and a Prayer"
- "You'd Be Surprised"
- "April Showers"
- "Don't Fence Me In"
- "Cool, Cool Water
- "Swanee"
- "Hello! Ma Baby"
- "For Me and My Gal"
- "I Want a Girl (Just Like the Girl That Married Dear Old Dad)"
- "Honey"
- "I Wonder Who's Kissing Her Now"
- "After the Ball"
- "Just One More Chance"
- "Just a Gigolo"
- "Tell Me That You Love Me"
- "That Old Gang of Mine"
- "Ac-Cent-Tchu-Ate the Positive"
- "I Found a Million Dollar Baby"
- "Help Me Make It Through the Night"
- "Chattanooga Choo Choo"
- "A Great Day"
- "The Birth of the Blues"
- "You Made Me Love You (I Didn't Want to Do It)"
- "Mammy"
- "Praise the Lord and Pass the Ammunition"
- "Piccadilly"
- "Old-Time Religion"
- "When the Saints Go Marching In"
- "Waltzing Matilda"
- "Tennessee Waltz"
- "Only You (And You Alone)"
- "Bad Moon Rising"
- "Blue Suede Shoes"
- "I Don't Want to Set the World on Fire"
- "He's Got the Whole World in His Hands"
- "Put Your Hand in the Hand"
- "Hallelujah"
- "Stayin' Alive"
