= Brice Bosnich =

Australian inorganic chemist (1936–2015)

Brice Bosnich FRS
- Born: 3 June 1936
- Died: 13 April 2015 (aged 78)
- Other name: Boz
- Scientific career
- Thesis: Substitution at an octahedral metal centre (1962)
- Doctoral advisor: Francis Patrick Dwyer

Brice Michael Bosnich FRS (3 June 1936 – 13 April 2015) was an Australian inorganic chemist. He gained recognition for the design of complex ligands useful in homogeneous catalysis.

== Education ==
He graduated from University of Sydney with a Bachelor of Science degree in 1958, and from Australian National University with a PhD in 1962, where he studied with Francis Patrick Dwyer. Contemporaries included Alan Sargeson.

== Career and research ==
After leaving ANU, he taught at University College London. He then moved to the University of Toronto, where he remained from 1970 to 1987. Thereafter he became Gustavus F. and Ann M. Swift Distinguished Service Professor at University of Chicago. After his retirement he became a visiting fellow at his alma mater, Australian National University.

As an independent scientist at the University of Toronto, he developed a rational approach to chiral diphosphine ligands, the premier member being chiraphos. Unlike previous chiral ligands, the chirality of chiraphos arose from the backbone of the chelate. This concept underpins many of the C2-symmetrical ligands subsequently developed in asymmetric hydrogenation. Other areas of research included hydroacylation catalysis and the development of ligands that mimic the spectroscopic properties of the blue copper proteins.

After his retirement, Bosnich questioned the Royal Society's position on climate change, which is the scientific consensus on the subject.

== Awards and honours ==
Bosnich was elected a Fellow of the Royal Society (FRS) in 2000. His biography reads:

Bosnich made many important contributions to inorganic and organometallic chemistry. A central theme of much of his research had been the stereochemistry of inorganic and organometallic complexes and of reactions mediated by such complexes. His design, synthesis and studies of the ligands, chiraphos and prophos, represent a major accomplishment and have contributed enormously to our understanding of the mechanisms of chiral recognition and asymmetric catalysis. Before his death, his research interests expanded to encompass the mechanistic aspects of a wide range of reactions, including allylic alkylations, metal catalysed Claisen rearrangements, hydroacylation and hydrosilation, as well as cooperative phenomena in binuclear metal complexes.
