= List of fellows of the Royal Society elected in 1983 =

This is a list of fellows and foreign members of the Royal Society elected in 1983.

== Fellows ==
1. Ian Graham Gass
2. William Wilton Douglas
3. Charles David Marsden
4. Dennis W. Sciama
5. Ian Sneddon
6. Sivaramakrishna Chandrasekhar
7. Ted Paige
8. Anthony Trafford James
9. Christopher Polge
10. Sir Philip Randle
11. John Lawson (d. 2008)
12. Alan Sargeson
13. Felix Weinberg (d. 2012)
14. Margaret Thatcher (under Statute 12)
15. George William Gray (1926–2013)
16. Martin Aitken
17. Sir David Attenborough (under Statute 12)
18. Sir Patrick Bateson
19. Edward Cocking
20. Pierre Deslongchamps
21. Reginald John Ellis
22. Malcolm Ferguson-Smith
23. Sir Alan Fersht
24. William Alexander Gambling
25. Ian Read Gibbons
26. Ray Guillery
27. Richard Henderson
28. Peter Higgs
29. Christopher Hooley
30. Peter Lawrence
31. George Lusztig
32. Donald Metcalf
33. Sir Keith O'Nions
34. Sir Michael Pepper
35. Michael J. D. Powell
36. Ivan Roitt
37. Sir Edwin Southern
38. Brian Spalding
39. Nigel Unwin
40. Ian Macmillan Ward
41. John Westcott
42. Dudley Howard Williams

== Foreign members ==
1. George Evelyn Hutchinson
2. Jean Leray
3. Henry Stommel
4. Charles Weissmann
5. Frank Westheimer
