= Polymer Interdisciplinary Research Centre =

Research centre in England

The Interdisciplinary Research Centre in Polymer Science and Technology is a consortium of research groups, formed in 1989 from the Universities of Durham, Leeds and Bradford, all of whom are involved research in polymer science and technology. The University of Sheffield joined in 2004. The Polymer IRC has complementary expertise in polymer chemistry, physics and processing with research programmes covering a wide range of multi-disciplinary polymer science and technology.

Research programmes in the Polymer IRC are funded by grants from government bodies, in particular the Engineering and Physical Sciences Research Council and industry.

From 2011 the Polymer IRC has been centred at the extensive polymer engineering laboratories at the University of Bradford, Polymer IRC with further interdisciplinary research in polymers with pharmaceuticals, and, since 2015, materials chemistry. From 2009, a substantial Science Bridges China programme in Advanced Materials for Healthcare with leading Chinese universities began, which has led to three joint international research laboratories and many early career researcher exchanges Science Bridges China.
