= Les Copeland (chemist) =

Australian agricultural chemist

Leslie Joshua Copeland AM FRSN (born 5 September 1946) is an Australian agricultural chemist.

== Early life and education ==
Copeland received BSc and PhD degrees in biochemistry from the University of Sydney. From 1971 to 1972 he was a research fellow at Yale University and from 1972 to 1973 he was a research fellow at the State University of New York.

== Career and research ==
Copeland’s professional interests lie in the intersection of food science and agricultural production. He is an emeritus professor at the University of Sydney. He was Dean of the Faculty of Agriculture from 2001 to 2007. Since 2011 he has been foundation editor of Agriculture journal. Since 2016 he has been editor in chief of Cereal Chemistry.

== Awards and honours ==
- 1979 - 1980 Fulbright Fellow, University of California, Davis, California, U.S.A.
- 2017 Emeritus Professor, University of Sydney
- 2019 Member of Order of Australia (AM)
- 2020 F.B. Guthrie Medal
- 2023 Fellow of Royal Society of NSW (FRSN)

== Select publications ==
- Copeland, Les (2020). "A century of agriculture in the University of Sydney". "Agricultural Science" journal
