= University of Sydney Faculty of Science =

Constituent body of the University of Sydney

Faculty of Science
- Type: Public
- Established: 1882
- Affiliations: University of Sydney
- Dean: Marcel Dinger
- Location: Camperdown / Darlington, Sydney, Australia
- Website: sydney.edu.au/science

The Faculty of Science is a constituent body of the University of Sydney, Australia. It was established in 1882.

In 2019 the faculty had a total student enrolment of 13,468 (21.2% of all students), thus making it the university's largest faculties and schools.

At the undergraduate level, the faculty offers the degrees of Bachelor of Science (also in two additional streams: Advanced; Advanced Mathematics), Bachelor of Liberal Arts and Sciences, Bachelor of Psychology, and Bachelor of Medical Science.

As of 2023, the Dean of the faculty is Professor Marcel Dinger.

== History ==
Teaching of science at the university began in 1852 (university was established in 1850), however the first professors were based within the Faculty of Arts. The Faculty of Science itself was established in 1882.

The first professor of mathematics and natural philosophy was Morris Pell, who was appointed in 1852.

== Organisation ==
The faculty is divided into 8 schools.

=== Schools ===
- School of Chemistry
- School of Geosciences
- School of History and Philosophy of Science
- School of Life and Environmental Sciences
- School of Mathematics and Statistics
- School of Physics
- School of Psychology
- School of Veterinary Science

=== Institutes ===
- The University of Sydney Institute of Agriculture, previously known as the Faculty of Agriculture and Environment.
- The University of Sydney Nano Institute (Sydney Nano), previously known as the Australian Institute for Nanoscale Science and Technology (AINST).

== Partnerships ==
The university is one of the founding partners with the Sydney Institute of Marine Science, which includes several other universities in the Sydney area.
