= Francis Patrick Dwyer =

Australian chemist (1910–1962)

Frank Dwyer
- Born: 3 December 1910; Raymond Terrace, New South Wales
- Died: 22 June 1962 (aged 51); Canberra
- Education: University of Sydney
- Occupation: Professor of Chemistry
- Employer(s): Sydney Technical College (until 1946), University of Sydney (1946-1957), Pennsylvania State University (1956-1962), John Curtin School of Medical Research (1959-1962)
- Scientific career
- Doctoral students: Brice Bosnich; Alan Sargeson; David Buckingham

Francis Patrick John Dwyer FAA (3 December 1910 – 22 June 1962) was Professor of Chemistry, Australian National University, Canberra. He was one of the most distinguished scientists Australia has produced. At the time of his death in 1962 he was widely recognised as a leading authority in inorganic chemistry, and had laid the foundation in Australia for a new field of research bridging science and medicine—biological inorganic chemistry. His influence as a teacher and as a researcher was widespread.

== Education and early life ==
Dwyer was born at Raymond Terrace, New South Wales and attended Marist Brothers College in Maitland. In 1928 he enrolled in the University of Sydney as a student in the faculty of Science and attained his Bachelor of Science in 1930 and his Masters in 1933.

== Career and research ==
Following his university studies Dwyer was appointed to the Inorganic Chemistry Department of the Sydney Technical College, where he held the post of Head Lecturer until 1946. In that year he was awarded the Doctor of Science from the University of Sydney for his thesis entitled: 'The Diazoamino Compounds; their Metallic Salts and Metallic Hydroxide Lakes'. The University's regulations for this degree were so stringent that Dwyer's award was the first D Sc in Chemistry awarded for nearly 20 years.

In 1946 Dwyer accepted a Senior Lectureship in Inorganic Chemistry at the University of Sydney, a position he held until 1957. Here he continued research on metal coordination compounds and began his important work on optical activity of metal complexes. This interest led him into biological chemistry.

In 1956 he was appointed to a new Chair of Inorganic Chemistry at Pennsylvania State University, USA. However a number of Australia's senior scientists, realising the loss to Australia of a scientist of Dwyer's calibre, succeeded in establishing for him a Visiting Reader in charge of a Unit of Biological Inorganic Chemistry in the John Curtin School of Medical Research in Canberra. This was done in conjunction with Australian National University and the Commonwealth Scientific and Industrial Research Organisation (CSIRO). Dwyer took up this position in 1959.

In 1960 he was given a Personal Professorship and in 1961 he was elected Fellow of the Australian Academy of Science. In Canberra he began investigating the effect of metal complexes on biological activity, and was a pioneer in this field. In all he published 160 research papers; he commenced the book Chelating Agents and Metal Chelates, which was published after his death.

== Awards and achievements ==
In recognition of his outstanding work, Professor Frank Dwyer attained the following awards and achievements

- Rennie Medal in 1940;
- Smith Medal and Prize in 1945 awarded by Royal Australian Chemical Institute.
- David Syme Medal and Prize in 1953 awarded by the University of Melbourne for distinguished work in natural sciences.
- He was the George Fisher-Baker lecturer at Cornell University USA in 1954
- In 1960 he held the first lectureship instituted by the Chemical Society of London for the purpose of encouraging the study of chemistry in Australian Universities.
- He gave the Liversidge Lecture entitled 'The Future of Inorganic Chemistry in Biology' to ANZAAS in 1959.
- In 1961 he was elected a Fellow of the Australian Academy of Science.
- He delivered the Presidential address to the Chemistry Section of ANZAAS in 1961
- Also in 1961 he was invited to address the Sixth International Conference on Coordination Chemistry in Detroit, Michigan, USA

== Personal life ==
On 12 January 1939 he married Lola, daughter of Arthur Carrington Bosworth and his wife Florence of Sydney. Frank and Lola had two sons, Frank and Mark, and a daughter Fleur. Frank was a research chemist with CSR in Sydney and produced a number of patents for the industry. Mark obtained a PhD in Chemistry from the Australian National University, taught Chemistry at the University of Adelaide, and worked in the pharmaceutical industry, also producing several patents. Fleur attained a Master of Education and worked in Catholic Education, including at the Australian Catholic University in Canberra.

Dwyer died suddenly of a heart attack at his home in the Canberra suburb of Manuka, Australian Capital Territory, aged 51, and was buried in Woden Cemetery, Canberra.

=== Posthumous ===
After Dwyer's death his friends and former students in the University of New South Wales Chemical Society established a fund to endow the Dwyer Memorial Lecture and Medal. The first Dwyer Lecturer was his old friend Professor Nyholm (1963). Subsequent Lecturers have included three Nobel Laureates and five Fellows of the Royal Society.
