= University of Sydney Institute of Agriculture =

Agricultural school of the University of Sydney

Sydney Institute of Agriculture
- Type: Public
- Established: 2017
- Affiliations: University of Sydney
- Director: Damien Field
- Location: Camperdown / Darlington, New South Wales, Australia

The University of Sydney Institute of Agriculture is a constituent body of the University of Sydney, Australia. Agriculture was first taught at the University by Australia's first Professor of Agriculture, Robert Dickie Watt, in 1910. He retired in 1946 and was succeeded as Dean of the Faculty of Agriculture by J.R.A. McMillan.

The first four agricultural science students held cadetships with the NSW Department of Agriculture and the first intake were awarded their degrees in April 1914. In 1920 Lorna Byrne and Margaret Ramsay were the first women to graduate in agricultural science. By 1933 the number of annual enrolments had grown to 14. After the second world war there was a significant increase in enrolments, which necessitated the building of several semi-permanent fibro “tramsheds”.

Walter Lawry Waterhouse enrolled in the new agricultural science course in 1911 and graduated in 1914 with first-class honours and the university medal. At the University of Minnesota he met the rust researcher Elvin Stakman. Back in Sydney in 1921 Waterhouse was appointed as lecturer in agricultural botany under Watt. He went on to receive the university’s first doctorate in agriculture in 1929 for a thesis on Australian rusts. In the 1930s and 1940s he bred rust-resistant wheat varieties which were rapidly adopted by farmers. He retired from the university in December 1952.

The University of Sydney Institute of Agriculture is commonly abbreviated to the Sydney Institute of Agriculture or SIA. It was formed at the start of 2017 when the university reduced the number of faculties (from 16 to 6) and rolled the Faculty of Agriculture and Environment into the Faculty of Science. Alex McBratney was Dean of the Faculty of Agriculture and Environment and became inaugural Director of the SIA. He was succeeded as Director by Damien Field.

According to the University website, the institute has over 500 members involved in teaching, research and outreach. The Institute's resources include over 900 hectares of farmland at Camden, on the outskirts of Sydney, and 2,000 hectares at Narrabri.

Research areas include:

- Digital agriculture e.g. using remote sensing (satellites), artificial intelligence and robotics
- Plant breeding Developing disease, heat and drought resistance
- Native grains and First Nations collaboration e.g investigating native millet (Panicum decompositum) as a nutritious, high-fibre, gluten-free source of flour
- Soil health e.g. contributing to the Australian national Soil Health Framework
- Food security Developing future-proofed varieties of wheat and other important foodstuffs
- Sustainable agriculture e.g. by mapping and protecting soils in Australia and overseas
- Development agriculture e.g. a project addressing barriers to healthy diets in low- and middle-income countries
