= Sever Sternhell =

Australian organic chemist (1930–2022)

Sever Sternhell AO
- Born: 30 May 1930; Lwow, Poland
- Died: 18 November 2022 (aged 92); Naremburn, Sydney, Australia
- Education: Newington College; University of Sydney; University of London; Imperial College London
- Occupation: Organic chemist
- Title: Emeritus Professor
- Spouse: Alicja (née Zalcberg 1932–)
- Parent(s): Maria (née Wachs) and Samson Sternhell

Severyn Marcel Sternhell AO (30 May 1930 – 18 November 2022) was a Polish-born Australian academic and organic chemist. He was professor of Chemistry at the University of Sydney and a Fellow of the Australian Academy of Science. His research focused on the induction of chirality into mesophases, aspects of steric hindrance and the mechanochemistry of organic compounds.

== Early life and education ==
Sternhell was born in Lwow, then in Poland but now in western Ukraine. His father was Samson Sternhell, a lawyer. Before the war he attended a Zionist Hebrew language primary school for five years. Having survived the Bergen-Belsen concentration camp, he emigrated to Australia with his parents to join members of the Sternhell family who had left Europe prior to World War II. Arriving in Sydney in February 1947, he enrolled as a boarder at Newington College a few days after the commencement of the first term. Having had no formal education since primary school, and only learnt English recently in Palestine, he spent the next nine months studying for the Leaving Certificate. He sat for his exams and received four A's and a B in English. Following Newington, he attended the University of Sydney and graduated with a BSc (hons) in 1951 and a MSc in 1953. In 1961, he was awarded a PhD and DIC from the University of London. After further study in London, he received a DSc from Imperial College.

== Research and university career ==
Sternhell began his career as a research chemist in private industry with Monsanto in 1953. Two years later, he was appointed a senior research officer at CSIRO and remained in that position until 1964. Sternhell was a senior lecturer in the Department of Organic Chemistry at the University of Sydney, from 1964 until 1967. He spent a further ten years as a reader in organic chemistry at the University of Sydney before being appointed Professor of Organic Chemistry. He was an Emeritus Professor from 1999. In 1991–92, he was chairman of the Australian Research Council Chemical Sciences Panel.

== Fellowships and honours ==
Sternhell was a Fellow, of the Australian Academy of Science and of the Royal Australian Chemical Institute. In 2001, he was awarded the Centenary Medal for his service to Australian society and science in organic chemistry and molecular engineering. In June 2018, he was made an Officer of the Order of Australia "for distinguished service to education in the field of organic chemistry, specifically to nuclear magnetic resonance, as an academic and researcher, and to scientific institutions".

== Death ==
Sternhell died in Naremburn, Sydney on 18 November 2022, at the age of 92.
