= 2021 in amusement parks =

This is a list of events and openings related to amusement parks that occurred in 2021. These various lists are not exhaustive.

== Amusement parks ==
=== Opening ===
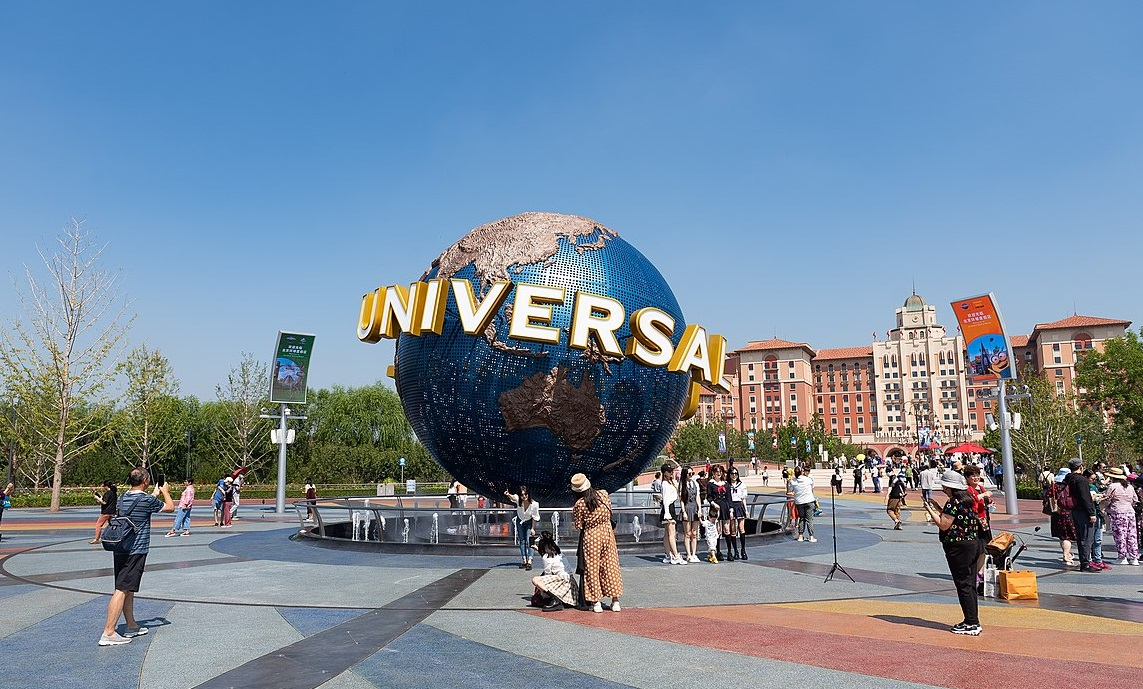
Universal Studios Beijing opened as the largest Universal Studios Park in the world.

- Armenia Yerevan Park – May 15
- Czech Republic Majaland Praha
- China Hot Go Dreamworld
- China Universal Studios Beijing – September 1 (soft opening)
  September 20 (grand opening)
- U.S. Legoland New York – May 29
- China Fantasy Valley
- China Fenghuang Paradise - January 1
- China Fuli Ocean Happy World
- Qatar Doha Oasis Quest
- China Jinan Sunac Land
- Italy Legoland Water Park Gardaland – June 15
- China Fuli Ocean Happy World - December 22

=== Reopened ===
- Belgium Plopsa Station Antwerp – October 2021

=== Change of name ===
- Belgium Comic Station Antwerp » Plopsa Station Antwerp
- U.S. Fantasy Island » Niagara Amusement Park & Splash World
- U.S. Six Flags Hurricane Harbor Gurnee » Six Flags Hurricane Harbor Chicago

=== Change of ownership ===
- U.S. Clementon Park and Splash World – Premier Parks, LLC » Indiana Beach Holdings, LLC (now known as IB Parks & Entertainment)
- U.S. Fantasy Island – Apex Parks Group » Indiana Beach Holdings, LLC (now known as IB Parks & Entertainment)
- U.S. Kentucky Kingdom – Themeparks LLC » Herschend Family Entertainment
- U.S. Adventureland – Adventure Lands of America Inc. » Palace Entertainment

=== Birthday ===
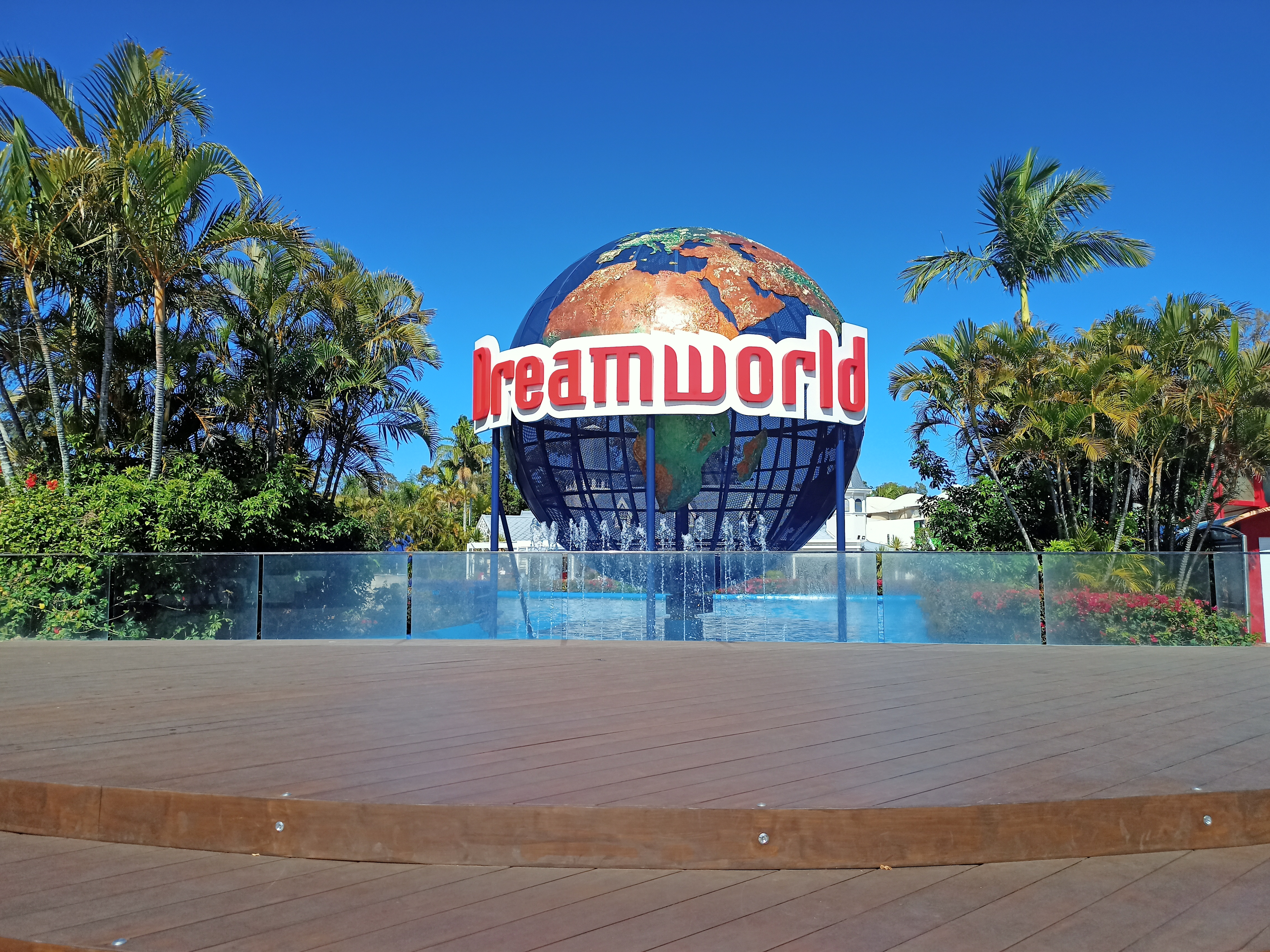
Australia's largest theme park Dreamworld celebrated its 40th anniversary in December.

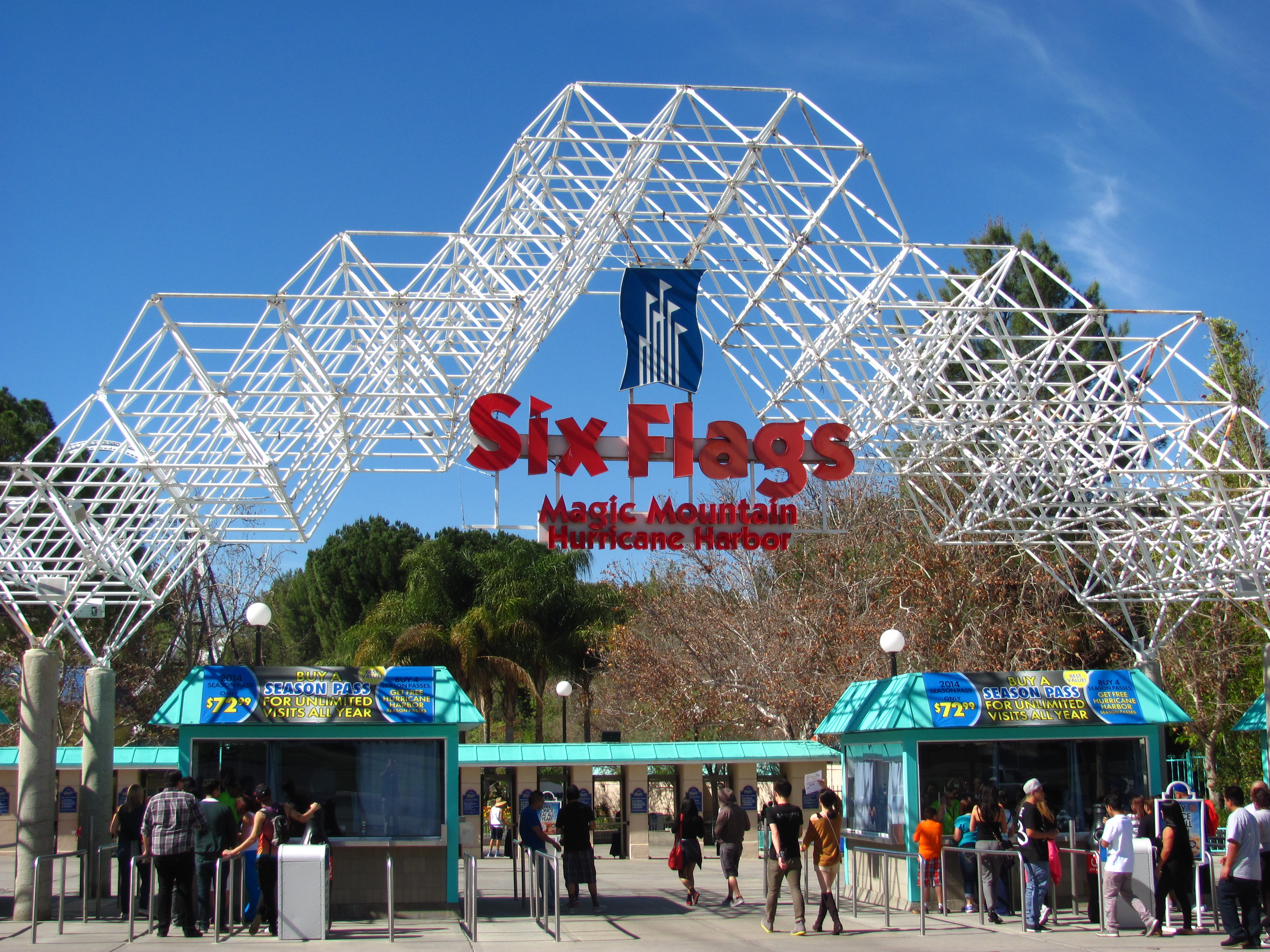
Six Flags Magic Mountain celebrated its 50th anniversary in May.

- Beijing Shijingshan Amusement Park - 35th birthday
- California's Great America - 45th birthday
- Walt Disney World Resort - 50th birthday
- Canada's Wonderland - 40th birthday
- Chimelong Paradise - 15th birthday
- Disney California Adventure - 20th birthday
- Dreamworld - 40th birthday
- Lagoon Amusement Park - 135th birthday
- Legoland Florida - 10th birthday
- Magic Kingdom - 50th birthday
- Michigan's Adventure - 65th birthday
- MagicLand - 20th birthday
- Toverland - 20th birthday
- Trans Studio Bandung - 10th birthday
- Six Flags Great America - 45th birthday
- Six Flags Magic Mountain - 50th birthday
- Six Flags Over Texas - 60th birthday
- Six Flags St. Louis - 50th birthday
- Sea World - 50th birthday
- Valleyfair - 45th birthday
- Waldameer & Water World - 125th birthday
- Warner Bros. Movie World - 30th birthday
- WhiteWater World - 15th birthday

=== Closed ===
- Fenghuang Paradise (Note: Fenghuang Paradise was closed weeks after opening due to illegal land usage)
- Aquatica San Diego – September 12
- De Valkenier – July
- Barry's Amusements

== Additions ==
=== Roller coasters ===
==== New ====
Name	Park	Type	Manufacturer	Opened	Ref(s)
Abyssus	Energylandia	Steel Launched roller coaster	Vekoma	July 14	
All Speeds	Sunac Land Chengdu	Launched roller coaster	Intamin	December 31	
Barreling Rapids	Austin's Park	Spinning roller coaster	SBF Visa Group	April 16	
Big Dipper	Luna Park Sydney	Hot Racer	Intamin	December 26	
Blue Fire	Xuzhou Paradise	Launched roller coaster	Mack Rides	December 30	
Bolt	Skytropolis Funland	Powered roller coaster	Beijing Shibaolai Amusement Equipment	2021	
Bolt	Mardi Gras	Spike Dragster	Maurer Rides	July 31	
Boomerang	Luna Park Sydney	Shuttle Family Coaster	Gerstlauer	October 23	
Boomerang	Yerevan Park	Family Boomerang roller coaster	Vekoma	May 15	
Crazy Coaster	Funland Theme Park	Spinning roller coaster	SBF Visa Group	2021	
Cross Magic Ring	Dragon Valley Theme Park	Steel roller coaster	Beijing Shibaolai Amusement Equipment	2021	
The Decepticoaster	Universal Studios Beijing	Steel Launched roller coaster	Bolliger & Mabillard	September 20	
Dingo Racer	Aussie World	Spinning roller coaster	Reverchon	2021	
Dragon Coaster	Legoland New York	Steel Family roller coaster	Zierer	July 9	
Dragon in the Jungle	Dragon Valley Theme Park	Launched roller coaster	Vekoma	2021	
Dragon Slayer	Adventureland	4th Dimension roller coaster	S&S – Sansei Technologies	May 29	
Dragon Train	Jinan Sunac Land	Family roller coaster	Golden Horse	2021	
Dragon's Apprentice	Legoland New York	Family Gravity Coaster	Zamperla	July 9	
EpiQ Coaster	Doha Quest	Steel Launched roller coaster	Premier Rides	2021	
€uro Coaster	Funland Theme Park	Steel roller coaster	SBF Visa Group	2021	
Family Roller Coaster	Fantasy Island	Junior roller Coaster	Güven Amusement Rides Factory	2021	
Farm Roller Coaster	Fenghuang Paradise	Wild mouse	Guohui Machinery	January 1	(Note: Fenghuang Paradise was closed weeks after opening due to illegal land usage. Because of this, the Farm Roller Coaster also closed)
Fighter Jet	Fanta Park Glorious Orient Ganzhou	Launched roller coaster	Vekoma	May 28	
Fighter Jet	Fanta Park Glorious Orient Ningbo	Launched roller coaster	Vekoma	September 7	
Flash Coaster	Yerevan Park	Steel roller coaster	Zierer	May 15	
Flight of the Hippogriff	Universal Studios Beijing	YoungStar Coaster	Mack Rides	September 20	
Fly with Flap	Doha Quest	Cloud Coaster	Extreme Engineering	2021	
Fridolin's verrückter Zauberexpress	Fantasiana	Family Launched roller coaster	ART Engineering GmbH	July 17	
Frontline Charge	Fanta Park Glorious Orient Ganzhou	Family Boomerang	Vekoma	May 28	
Frontline Charge	Fanta Park Glorious Orient Ningbo	Family Boomerang	Vekoma	September 7	
Fun in the Sun	Funplex, Myrtle Beach	Big Air Coaster	SBF Visa Group	May 21	
Grand Prix Racers	Gulliver's Valley Resort	Family roller coaster	SBF Visa Group	May 28	
GraviTrax	Ravensburger Spieleland	Big Air Coaster	SBF Visa Group	June 22	
Happy Coaster	Yerevan Park	Spinning roller coaster	SBF Visa Group	May 15	
Jersey Devil Coaster	Six Flags Great Adventure	Steel roller coaster	Rocky Mountain Construction	June 13	
Jurassic Flyers	Universal Studios Beijing	Inverted Powered Coaster	Mack Rides	September 30	
Kondaa	Walibi Belgium	Steel Megacoaster	Intamin	May 8	
Krampus Expédition	Nigloland	Water coaster	Mack Rides	June 12	
Legendary Twin Dragon	Chongqing Sunac Land	Impulse roller coaster	Intamin	February 3	
Light Explorers	Energylandia	Family Boomerang roller coaster	Vekoma	July 14	
Lipovitan Rocket☆Luna	Yomiuriland	Inverted roller coaster	Gerstlauer	November 12	
Little Nipper	Luna Park Sydney	Kiddy Coaster	Preston & Barbieri	October 23	
Loop-Dee Doop-Dee	Universal Studios Beijing	Steel Family roller coaster	Golden Horse	September 20	
Merkant	Mandoria	Bob Coaster	Gerstlauer	July 8	
Monster	Gröna Lund	Inverted roller coaster	Bolliger & Mabillard	June 2	
Movie Park Studios	Movie Park Germany	Multidimensional Coaster	Intamin	2021	
Mroczny Dwór	Mandoria	Spinning roller coaster	SBF Visa Group	July 8	
Oryx Express	Doha Quest	Indoor Junior Coaster	Vekoma	2021	
Phoenix	Deno's Wonder Wheel Amusement Park	Suspended Family Coaster	Vekoma	July 2	
Power Coaster	Rowdy Bear Ridge Adventure Park	CoasterKart	Wiegand	March 13	
Roller Coaster	Jinan Sunac Land	Spinning roller coaster	Nanfang Amusement Rides Co.	2021	
Royal Knight	Jinan Sunac Land	Kiddy Coaster	Golden Horse	2021	
Runaway Train	Funland Theme Park	Junior roller Coaster	unknown	2021	
Skyflyer	Deno's Wonder Wheel Amusement Park	Kiddy Coaster	SBF Visa Group	2021	
Sky Track	Fanta Park Glorious Orient Ganzhou	Family roller coaster	unknown	May 28	
Space Twister	Doha Quest	Indoor Spinning roller coaster	SBF Visa Group	2021	
Spinning Racer	Fantasy Island	Steel Spinning roller coaster	Maurer Rides	April 12	
Steel Taipan	Dreamworld	Steel Launched roller coaster	Mack Rides	December 15	
Storm Chaser	Paultons Park	Steel Spinning roller coaster	Mack Rides	April 12	
Stunt Pilot	Silverwood Theme Park	Steel roller coaster	Rocky Mountain Construction	May 29	
Taxi #1	Bollywood Parks Dubai	Steel Family roller coaster	Zamperla	January 21	
The Ride to Happiness	Plopsaland De Panne	Xtreme Spinning Coaster	Mack Rides	July 21	
Tower Coaster	Zip World Tower	CoasterKart	Wiegand	July 3	
Treasure Minecar	Jinan Sunac Land	Family roller coaster	unknown	2021	
Twin Dragon	Dragon Valley Theme Park	Dueling roller coaster	Golden Horse	2021	
Twin Spin	Enchanted Kingdom	Spinning roller coaster	Mack Rides	June 5	
VelociCoaster	Universal's Islands of Adventure	Steel Blitz Coaster	Intamin	June 10	
Vic's Roller Coaster	Majaland Praha	Steel Family roller coaster	Zierer	December 27	
Wacky Worm	Coney Beach Pleasure Park	Junior roller Coaster	Güven Amusement Rides Factory	2021	
Wooden Dragons Roller Coaster	Jinan Sunac Land	Wooden roller coaster	Martin & Vleminckx; The Gravity Group	May 29	
Xolo Loca	Casino Pier	Big Air Coaster	SBF Visa Group	August 18	
Yan Coaster	Yerevan Park	Junior Coaster	Vekoma	May 15	
unknown	Golden City, Russia	Powered roller coaster	unknown	2021	
unknown	Window of the World	Steel Launched roller coaster	S&S - Sansei Technologies	2021	

==== Relocated ====
Name	Park	Type	Manufacturer	Opened	Formerly	Ref(s)
Boomerang Hyper Coaster	Trans Studio Cibubur	Boomerang roller coaster	Vekoma	May 14	Boomerang at Knott's Berry Farm	
Looping Star	Clacton Pier	Steel roller coaster	Pinfari	October 23	Looping Star at Codona's Amusement Park	
Rocket	Southport Pleasureland	Steel Family roller coaster	Pinfari	June 5	Crazy Train at Gulliver's Warrington	
Silver Mountain	Mer de Sable	Junior roller Coaster	Vekoma	June 12	Bushwacker at Ratanga Junction	
Super Glider	Skytropolis Funland	Flying roller coaster	Zamperla	2021	Flying Coaster at Genting Theme Park	
unknown	Golden City, Russia	Accelerator Coaster	Intamin	2021	Zaturn at Space World	

==== Refurbished ====
Name	Park	Type	Manufacturer	Opened	Formerly	Ref(s)
Flucht von Novgorod	Hansa-Park	Launched Euro-Fighter	Gerstlauer	2021	—N/a	
Lightning Rod	Dollywood	Hybrid Launched roller coaster	Rocky Mountain Construction	March	—N/a	
Lil' Devil Coaster	Six Flags Great Adventure	Kiddie roller coaster	Zamperla	2021	Road Runner Railway	
The Riddler Mindbender	Six Flags Over Georgia	Steel roller coaster	Anton Schwarzkopf	September 18	Mind Bender	
Road Runner Rollercoaster	Warner Bros. Movie World	Steel Junior coaster	Vekoma	September 14	—N/a	
Woodstock Express	Michigan's Adventure	Junior roller Coaster	Chance Rides	May 29	Big Dipper	

=== Other attractions ===
==== New ====
Name	Park	Type	Opened	Ref(s)
Adirondack Outlaw	The Great Escape and Hurricane Harbor	Funtime Vomatron	July	
Bay Glory	Qianhai	Ferris wheel	April 18	
Beagle Brigade Airfield	Canada's Wonderland	Zamperla Flying Tigers	July 7	
The Blue Barnacle	Chessington World of Adventures	Pirate Ship	April 16	
Bug	Luna Park Sydney	Mini ferris wheel	October 23	
Cloud Nine	Luna Park Sydney	Samba Balloons	October 23	
Croc Drop	Chessington World of Adventures	Drop tower	April 12	
Count Kenny's Mystery Mansion	Dreamworld	Seasonal walk-through attraction	October 16	
Dare Devil Dive Flying Machines	Six Flags Fiesta Texas	Zamperla Super Air Race	March 6	
Despicable Me Minion Mayhem	Universal Studios Beijing	Motion Simulator	July 5	
Disney Enchantment	Magic Kingdom	Fireworks show	October 1	
Doctor Strange: Journey into the Mystic Arts	Disney California Adventure	Stage show	June 4	
Double Barrel	Wet'n'Wild Gold Coast	Inline tube slides	December 10	
Emmet's Flying Adventure	Legoland California	Flying Theater Simulator ride	2021	
FlyOver Las Vegas	Las Vegas	Flying theater	2021	
Freaky Frogs	Luna Park Sydney	Jump Around	October 23	
The Harvest Eatery/Winterville	Dreamworld	Food precinct	June 25	
H20asis	Wet'n'Wild Gold Coast	Splash pad	December 10	
Harley Quinn Spinsanity	Six Flags America	Zamperla Giant Discovery Frisbee	2021	
Harry Potter and the Forbidden Journey	Universal Studios Beijing	RoboCoaster G2 Dark ride	July 5	
KABOOM!	Wet'n'Wild Gold Coast	Water coaster	December 10	
The LEGO Movie World	Legoland California; Legoland Billund	Themed area	May 27	
Lights Camera Action!	Universal Studios Beijing	Special Effects Show	July 5	
Loopy Lighthouse	Luna Park Sydney	Jumpin' Tower	October 23	
Mario Kart: Koopa's Challenge	Universal Studios Japan	Augmented Reality Dark Ride	March 18	
Mountain Bay Cliff's	Canada's Wonderland (Splash Works)	Cliff-Jumping Attraction	July 7	
Remy's Ratatouille Adventure	Epcot	Trackless dark ride	October 1	
Silly Sub	Luna Park Sydney	Crazy Bus	October 23	
Sledgehammer	Luna Park Sydney	Discovery Revolution	2021	
Snake River Expedition	Cedar Point	Riverboat	May 28	
Spring County Fair	Dreamworld	Annual spring event	September 17	
Super Ripper	Wet'n'Wild Gold Coast	Body slides	December 10	
Supergirl Sky Flyer	Six Flags New England	Zamperla Endeavour	2021	
Super Nintendo World	Universal Studios Japan	Themed area	March 18	
SX360	Aussie World	Typhoon 360	June 18	
The Secret Life of Pets: Off the Leash!	Universal Studios Hollywood	Dark ride	April 8	
Top Scan	Coney Beach Pleasure Park	Top Scan	2021	
Transformers: Battle for the AllSparks	Universal Studios Beijing	3-D Special Effects Dark ride	July 5	
Tsunami Surge	Six Flags Hurricane Harbor Chicago	Water coaster	May 29	
WaterWorld Stunt Show	Universal Studios Beijing	Water Stunt Show	July 5	
Web Slingers: A Spider-Man Adventure	Disney California Adventure	Interactive Dark ride	June 4	

==== Relocated ====
Name	Park	Type	Opened	Formerly	Ref(s)
Sea Warrior	Indiana Beach	Kasper Klaus (SDC) Polyp	2021	unknown at Lake Winnepesaukah	

==== Refurbished ====
Name	Park	Type	Opened	Formerly	Ref(s)
Cave of Waves	WhiteWater World (Dreamworld)	Wave pool	September 17	—N/a	
DreamWorks Destination	Universal Studios Florida	Theatre in the round	2021	A Day in the Park with Barney	
Knott’s Bear-y Tales: Return to the Fair	Knott's Berry Farm	Interactive dark ride	May 21	Voyage to the Iron Reef	
Snow White's Enchanted Wish	Disneyland	Dark ride	April 30	Snow White's Scary Adventures	
The Hall of Presidents	Magic Kingdom	Multimedia and Audio-Animatronic show	2021	—N/a	
Wiggles Bay	WhiteWater World (Dreamworld)	Kids Play area and body slides	September 17	—N/a	

== Closed attractions & roller coasters ==
Name	Park	Type	Closed	Refs
Blue Man Group Theatre	Universal Orlando	Theater	February 1	
BuzzSaw	Dreamworld	SkyLoop X-Coaster	August 31	
Canobie Corkscrew	Canobie Lake Park	Steel roller coaster	2021	
The Dragon	Ocean Park Hong Kong	Steel roller coaster	2021	
Epcot Forever	Epcot	Fireworks show	September 28	
Farm Roller Coaster	Fenghuang Paradise	Wild mouse	January	
Happily Ever After	Magic Kingdom	Fireworks show	September 29	
Ignite the Dream, A Nighttime Spectacular of Magic and Light	Shanghai Disneyland Park	Multimedia, water, and pyrotechnic show	April 7	
Jedi Training: Trials of the Temple	Hong Kong Disneyland	Live show	May 31	
Melbourne Star	Melbourne Docklands	Ferris wheel	September 6	
Momonga Standing and Loop Coaster	Yomiuriland	TOGO Stand-up roller coaster	September 20	
Sorcerers of the Magic Kingdom	Magic Kingdom	Interactive Game Attraction	January 24	
Top Thrill Dragster	Cedar Point	Launched roller coaster	August 15 (Note: The closure of Top Thrill Dragster was announced on 6 September 2022, however it had not been operational since 15 August 2021 due to a ride incident.)	
Wahoo Run	Adventure Island	Water slide	March	
Wicked Twister	Cedar Point	Twisted Impulse Coaster	September 6	
Wild West Mine Train	Ocean Park Hong Kong	Mine train roller coaster	August 31	

== Themed accommodation ==
=== New ===
- Universal Beijing Resort — May 18 (soft opening) June 1 (grand opening)

== Incidents and accidents ==
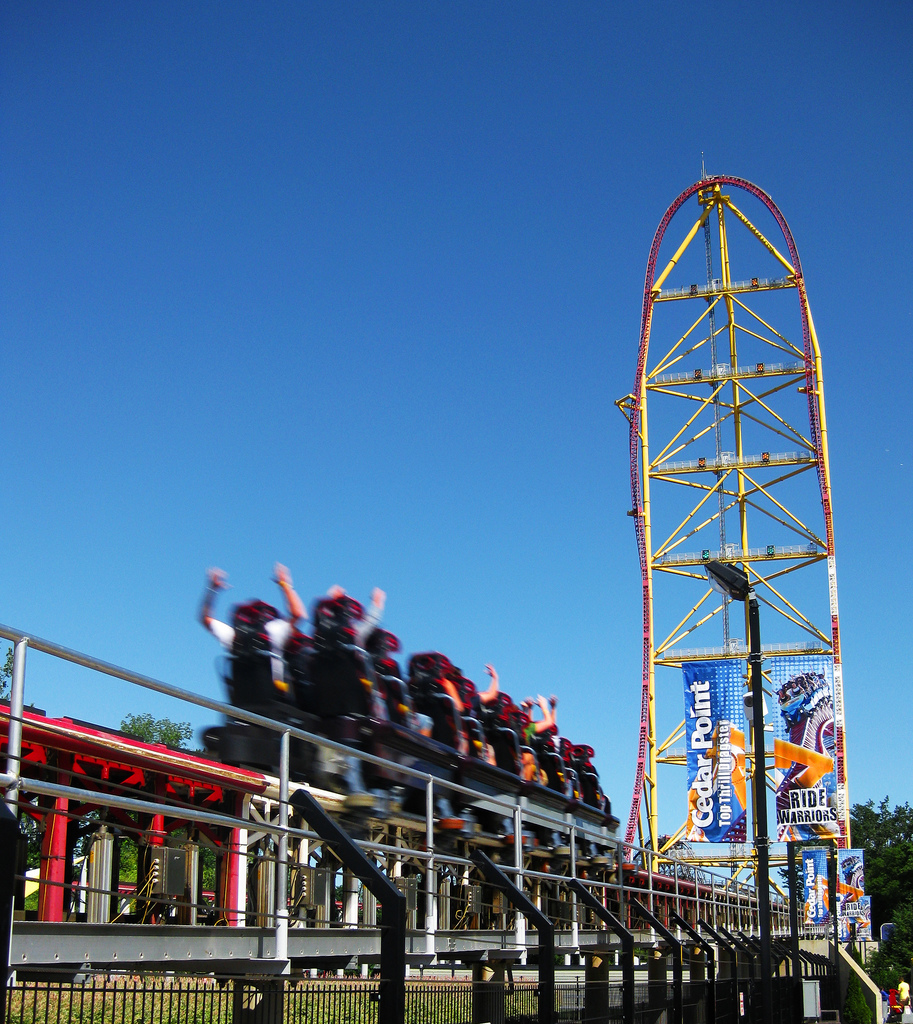
Top Thrill Dragster

=== Fatal ===
- Adventureland - On 3 July, a raft carrying 6 passengers on the Raging River river rapids ride overturned, killing an 11-year-old boy and seriously injuring 3 others.
- Glenwood Caverns Adventure Park - On 5 September, a 6-year-old girl was killed after falling from the Haunted Mine Drop underground drop tower. The incident is currently under investigation.
- Hayrola Luna Park - A 19-year-old teenager chocked to death on her own vomit when she was riding the Kamikaze frisbee ride. The ride operators reportedly refused to stop the ride.
- Lagoon Amusement Park - A 32-year-old man fell almost 50 feet (15 m) to his death on the Sky Ride chair lift. He was seen clinging onto the safety bar.

=== Non-fatal ===
- Blackpool Pleasure Beach - On 25 April, riders were forced to climb down the top of the lift hill on the Big One roller coaster at the Blackpool Pleasure Beach after it broke down.
- Cedar Point - On 15 August, a 44-year-old woman was seriously injured after she was struck by a L-shaped piece of metal while waiting in the queue for Top Thrill Dragster. The ride was closed for the remainder of the season.
- Six Flags Great Adventure - On 13 June, 2 riders were injured when the Saw Mill Log Flume tipped at an angle.
- Six Flags Great Adventure - On 29 June, the train on El Toro partially derailed when the rear car's up-stop wheels, which are designed to prevent the train from lifting off the track, moved out of place and up onto the track. There were no reported injuries.
