= Storm hunter =

Storm hunter or stormhunter or Storm Hunter may refer to:

- A person performing storm chasing
  - Hurricane hunters or typhoon hunters, also called storm hunters
- Storm Hunter (born 1994, as Storm Sanders), Australian tennis player
- T. Storm Hunter (born 1957, as Mark Tucker), American musician
- Storm-Hunters (TV series), a TV show developed for The Weather Network (Canada) by Mark Robinson (meteorologist)
- Stormjaers (Afrikaans: Stormhunters), the WWII paramilitary wing of the Afrikaner Ossewabrandwag

== See also ==
- Storm chaser (disambiguation)
- Hunter (disambiguation)
- Storm (disambiguation)
