= Drakon (roller coaster) =

Steel roller coaster in Hampshire, England

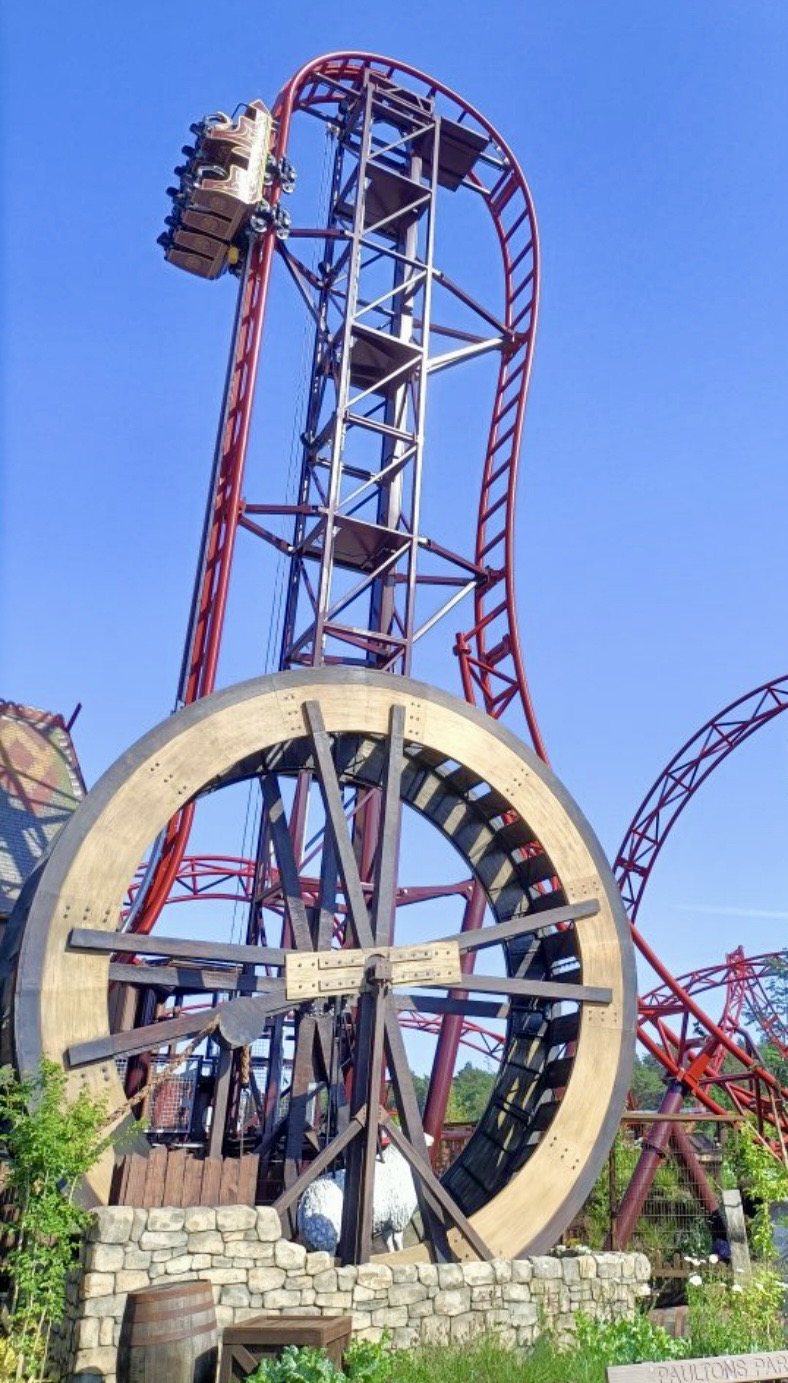
- An overview of Drakon

Paultons Park
- Location: Paultons Park
- Park section: Valgard: Realm of the Vikings
- Coordinates: 50.947416°N 1.556312°W
- Status: Operating
- Opening date: May 16, 2026

General statistics
- Type: Steel – Euro-Fighter
- Manufacturer: Gerstlauer
- Model: Euro-Fighter Custom
- Lift/launch system: Chain lift hill
- Height: 23 m (75 ft)
- Length: 390 m (1,280 ft)
- Speed: 72 km/h (45 mph)
- Inversions: 2
- Max vertical angle: 97°
- Theme: Vikings
- Drakon at RCDB

Drakon is a steel roller coaster at Paultons Park in the New Forest National Park, near the village of Ower in Hampshire, England. Manufactured by Gerstlauer, the ride is a custom model of the company's Euro-Fighter roller coaster design. The attraction opened on 16 May 2026 as part of the park's new Viking-themed area, Valgard: Realm of the Vikings.

Drakon is the first inverting roller coaster at Paultons Park and is promoted as the park's most intense attraction. The coaster features a vertical lift hill, followed by a beyond-vertical first drop, and includes two inversions along its layout.

== History ==
On 17 May 2025, the Daily Mirror published an article confirming that Paultons Park would develop a new Viking-themed area titled Valgard: Realm of the Vikings for a cost of £12 million. Drakon was announced to serve as the most prominent attraction within the area, and became the park's first roller coaster to feature inversions upon opening on 16 May 2026.

Track was completed on 6 November 2025. The ride's trains arrived on 27 February 2026 before the ride completed its first test cycle on 2 March 2026.

== Characteristics ==
=== Ride experience ===
After departing the station, the train executes a left-hand turn before ascending a 23 metres (75 ft) vertical chain lift hill. At the summit, it descends a beyond-vertical (~97°) first drop, leading into a twisted airtime hill, intertwining with Raven. The layout then enters the ride's first inversion, a step-up under flip.

Following the inversion, the train passes over a banked airtime hill that transitions from a right to a left bank before entering a right-hand turn. The train then navigates the second inversion, a zero-g stall, in which riders experience a brief period of weightlessness while the train is inverted. After exiting the element, the track banks to the right and enters the final brake run, returning to the station.

=== Trains ===
The ride's three trains consist of two rows with four-across seating, accommodating a total of eight riders per train. Each train is equipped with over-the-shoulder restraints.
