= Paultons Park =

Theme park in Hampshire, England

- Previously known as Paulton's Park, Paulton's Park and Bird Garden
- Interactive map of Paultons Park
- Location: New Forest, Hampshire, SO51 6AL, England
- Coordinates: 50.94887°N 1.552355°W
- Opened: 17 May 1983
- Owner: The Mancey Family
- Operating season: February half term, Mid-March to October and selected dates in November, December and January.
- Area: 140 acres (0.57 km^{2})

Attractions
- Total: Over 70 rides and attractions
- Roller coasters: 8
- Water rides: 6
- Website: Paultons Park

Paultons Park is an amusement park located in the New Forest National Park, near the village Ower, in Hampshire, England, with over 70 rides and attractions. The park is situated on the former Paulton's Estate, and covers 140 acres of land and features a collection of around 80 species of birds and animals, in addition to the rides. The park garnered international recognition in 2011, when it opened the Peppa Pig World themed area based on the children's animated television series Peppa Pig. The park has since opened the creature-themed area Critter Creek, the dinosaur-themed Lost Kingdom, the Western-themed Tornado Springs, and the Viking-themed Valgard: Realm of the Vikings.

Most of the theme-park rides are designed for children and families, so the park considers itself a family venue. The nearest railway station is Totton, 5.64 km (3.50 mi) away from the attraction.

== History ==
=== Estate and house ===
The park is located on land on the Paulton's Estate. In 1269 the land was in the possession of the Abbot of Glastonbury, who sold it to John de Palton. The estate has since been named after him. The land then passed down to John Touchet, who in 1497 led a rebellion against King Henry VII; Touchet was defeated and beheaded, and his lands confiscated by the crown. The lands left royal ownership in 1547, when the newly crowned King Edward VI gave the estate to John Paulet. This continued until 1780, when Hans Sloane inherited the estate from Hans Stanley, who changed his name to Hans Sloane Stanley as a sign of gratitude. The estate, now covering 3,000 acres (1,200 hectares), was modelled and designed by Capability Brown in the 18th century.

The house was a hotel from around 1945 to 1954. A fire destroyed it in 1963.

In 1979, John and Anne Mancey (parents of the current director, Richard Mancey) bought the derelict 500-acres Paultons Estate, restored the gardens and lake and opened a fun park. Four years later, in 1983, Paultons Park opened as a country park and bird garden.

=== 1983–1999 ===
The theme park opened as Paultons Park and Bird Gardens on 17 May 1983. The park covered 140 acres (57 hectares), with four staff members and attractions featuring only an adventure playground, the Village Life Museum located in a converted barn, and the numerous birds and animals.

Three years after the launch, in 1986, the attractions were expanded with the Railway Station, Station Tea Rooms and Rio Grande Railway being constructed, alongside the Magic Forest, Kids Kingdom and Captain Blood's Cavern. 1988 saw the Land of the Dinosaurs, the Rabbit Ride and the Trampolines being completed, with the Astroglide and Crazy Snooker added the following year. The Bumper Boats attraction was added in 1990 alongside a Pets Corner area, with a maze with large clock at the centre added for 1991 and the Flying Saucer ride installed in 1992.

Also in 1992, the Runaway Train roller coaster was installed, becoming the park's first major ride. It was accompanied by a mirror maze and the Sky Diver the following year and allowed visitors to break the 400,000 mark in 1995. In 1996, the Tiny Tots playground was constructed along with a walkthrough tableaux entitled The Wonderful World of Wind in the Willows, following the story of the same name. The year also saw the introduction of Santa's Wonderland, an event in every festive season to this day.

In 1997, the Tea Cup Ride became another popular addition to the park, and the following year the Percy's Play Park play area and the Go-Karts were constructed, with the latter providing older children with an attraction.

=== 1999–2009 ===
In 1999, the park began expanding, with a new ride built most years since. In 1999, this was the Raging River Ride, the largest ride at the time and costing £500,000. For the new millennium, the Runaway Train ride was dismantled and replaced with the Stinger roller coaster. The Runaway Train was relocated to Dunes Leisure Park in Lincolnshire.

2001 saw three new rides added to the park: The Pirate Ship, Viking Boats and the Dragon Ride, which replaced the Crazy Karts ride located on the same area. In recent years, the rides had become more focused on attracting older audiences, and so to compensate two rides were built for 2002 solely for children under seven: The Digger Ride and Seal Falls. Two rides were constructed in 2003 – the Wave Runner entertained thrill seekers, while The Flying Frog catered for children by being the younger version of the Stinger.

2004 saw two drop rides installed; Jumping Jack for younger audiences and the taller Jumping Bean for older visitors, both Moser Rides drop towers. The Bumper Boats ride was removed and replaced with a penguin enclosure on the same site, as well as an upgrade in the animal areas. The Kontiki ride was built in 2005, with the Magic Carpet built on the site of the Wirly Copters ride the same year.

In 2006, the park was expanded when Paultons in the previous season of 2005, construction started at a cost of £2 million on Cobra, a Gerstlauer Bobsled coaster. This later became a difficulty for the park due to the lands status and legal rights, however, action only began in 2009. Paultons had shifted its ride investment towards the older visitor market, and to compensate opened the Trekking Tractors ride in 2007, in which children could see growing in progress with farming machinery around. The Crazy Snooker, Crazy Golf and Panning for Gold attractions, were removed, and replaced by Gold Rush Falls, consisting of new and re-themed Crazy Golf and Panning for Gold attractions.

2008 saw the 25th anniversary of the park. As a result, a traditional style ride was installed: The Sky Swinger, and the entrance plaza was remodelled. As the new ride would be built on the site of the clock maze, the clock was transported to the entrance plaza to become the centrepiece of a new side garden. However, the most striking part of the new plaza is a Kugel ball added to celebrate the anniversary. It is the largest in the UK, at 1.5 metres diameter and weighing 6.5 tonnes.

Soon after the anniversary, the park undertook a major rebranding project in which the logo was changed, the previous slogan "It's a Hoot! Hoot!" was dropped and the owl mascot was seen less.

The park's expansion continued in 2009 with the addition of The Edge, a Zamperla Disk’o Coaster, built next to the Cobra, and the addition of the Water Kingdom, replacing the Kids Kingdom play area. However, the park was told they may have to move the Cobra and Edge after an application to grant them retrospective planning permission was narrowly turned down by the national park planning committee by seven votes to five. The area where these rides were situated is designated 'Country Park' and not 'Amusement Park' in planning terms, whereas all other areas of the park are now recognised as an amusement park and therefore have permitted development rights. After a separate application for the Cobra was made it was announced on 22 December 2009 the ride had been granted retrospective permission and could remain in its current location.

Another planning application was lodged with the New Forest National Park Planning Authority to retain the Edge ride. This application received public support and Paulton's were granted permission by the New Forest NPA to retain the Edge ride in its current location on 16 March 2010.

=== 2010–2019 ===
No new rides were opened in 2010: instead, all efforts were put into 2011's new opening Peppa Pig World. This features three large rides and several more smaller rides and attractions all contained within a themed area. This is the world's first Peppa Pig theme park. The area also includes the largest Peppa Pig toy shop in the world selling Peppa Pig-themed merchandise. This new development was heavily promoted through the Internet, television and radio adverts, even changing the park's name to Paulton's Park, Home of Peppa Pig World. The area opened on 6 April 2011 and visitor numbers to the park increased from 500,000 per year to 1 million after the year of opening.

In 2012 the park opened a new drop-and-twist 25m tower ride called Magma. A volcano-theming structure surrounds the ride and there is an animatronic dinosaur inside the volcano in a 'cage', beside the queue line. Smoke and rumbling sound effects occurred when the ride moved up out of the volcano, though these effects sometimes don't work.

In 2013 the park opened a 4D cinema showing "Curse of Skull Rock" which replaced the Village Life Museum and as part of a 1950 New Orleans-themed area called Show Street.

In 2014, the park began demolishing its old entrance to make way for a new gateway building consisting of the Big Toy Shop and Wildwoods restaurant. New Admissions and Guest Information kiosks were also built as part of the development. The park also added a new ride, a Victorian Double Decker Carousel, as well as that a new footpath was constructed along the main entrance.

In 2015, the park began a rebranding of various areas of the park. The area surrounding the Stinger and Wind in the Willows attractions was named Critter Creek and themed around the discovery of a number of whimsical animals and plants by Professor Stanley Blast. The Stinger was renamed Cat-O-Pillar to reflect its new half-cat-half-caterpillar theme, and Wind in the Willows was replaced by Beastie Burrow, a live insect and amphibian exhibit. A new miniature train ride called Professor Blast's Expedition express was also installed. A four-acre area encompassing the Rabbit Ride, Astroglide, Land of the Dinosaurs and Kiddies Play Village was also cleared in order to begin development of the Lost Kingdom, a dinosaur-themed land due for completion in spring 2016.

On 17 May 2016 the park opened Lost Kingdom – a dinosaur-themed park land suitable for younger and older children aged 6–12. The land cost £9 million to build and is home to 8 rides and attractions: Flight of Pterosaur, a Vekoma family suspended coaster, Velociraptor, a Vekoma family boomerang coaster, Temple Heights, a re-themed Zamperla magic carpet, Dino Chase, a Zierer Tivoli junior coaster, Boulder Dash, a Zamperla demolition derby ride, Dinosaur Tour Co., a Meteallbau Emmeln track ride, Alive – a dinosaur meet and greet character experience and the Little Explorers play ground.

A new discovery trail also opened on 17 May 2016 to encourage native species from the New Forest to reside. This includes interactive boards along the route and over 40 bird and bat boxes.

In 2017, Jumping Jack and Jumping Bean were removed and relocated, and currently no ride has replaced them, although the operator building still remains.

In January 2017 Paultons announced on the Peppa Pig World website that a new project had started to make Peppa Pig World "Bigger and Better". The statement on the website simply stated "New Attractions Under Construction". This was later revealed to be a new water ride, new monorail-style ride and an expansion to the pedestrian areas. Park signage states that the attractions are to open in spring 2018.

At the start of the 2018 winter season, a new animal area named "Little Africa" opened next to Peppa Pig world. This features a walk-through aviary, nocturnal house and several new animal enclosures.

=== 2020s ===
It was announced that Tornado Springs, a western-themed area, would be installed for 2020. The land cost £12m and there are 8 rides in this area including a Mack Rides spinning coaster, which is located next to the Buffalo Falls water ride, which has received an overhaul. In April 2020, the park announced that the opening of the new area and its attractions would be delayed until 2021, in light of the ongoing COVID-19 pandemic that had halted all work with contractors and placing the park's operating season in jeopardy. The area eventually opened in April 2021, and Farmyard Flyer, a junior coaster opened in April 2022 as part of Tornado Springs.

In November 2021, Peppa Pig World was mentioned by British Prime Minister Boris Johnson in a speech given to the Confederation of British Industry. Johnson revealed that he had previously visited the theme park with his wife and their children, and referred to it as "very much my kind of place". The following month opposition leader Keir Starmer confirmed that he too had visited Peppa Pig World - "it's dreadful," he said.

In 2023 the 4D cinema closed with the space transformed into the parks first dark ride, a Mack Rides Gameplay theatre named Ghostly Manor, which opened in 2025 at a cost of £3.5 million.

A new Viking-themed area for the park's 2026 season was first hinted at during an enthusiast event held on 18 May 2024. Construction began in September 2024 and on 17 May 2025, details of the new area were shared at the 2025 Paulton's Park Super Fans enthusiast event. The area was confirmed to be called Valgard: Realm of the Vikings, a £12m investment scheduled to open May 2026. Valgard features Paultons Park's first inverting rollercoaster, Drakon, a Gerstlauer Eurofighter featuring a vertical lift hill and 2 inversions (one being the UK's first zero-g stall), as well as the UK's first ART Engineering Wild Swing called Vild Swing, sending thrill-seekers spinning 12 metres into the air. Valgard also saw Cobra rethemed to Raven.

The area officially opened to the public on 16 May 2026. On the same day at the third Super Fans Event the park announced that the area would expand in 2027 with the opening of Serpent's Curse, the UK's first water coaster, to be built by Mack Rides.

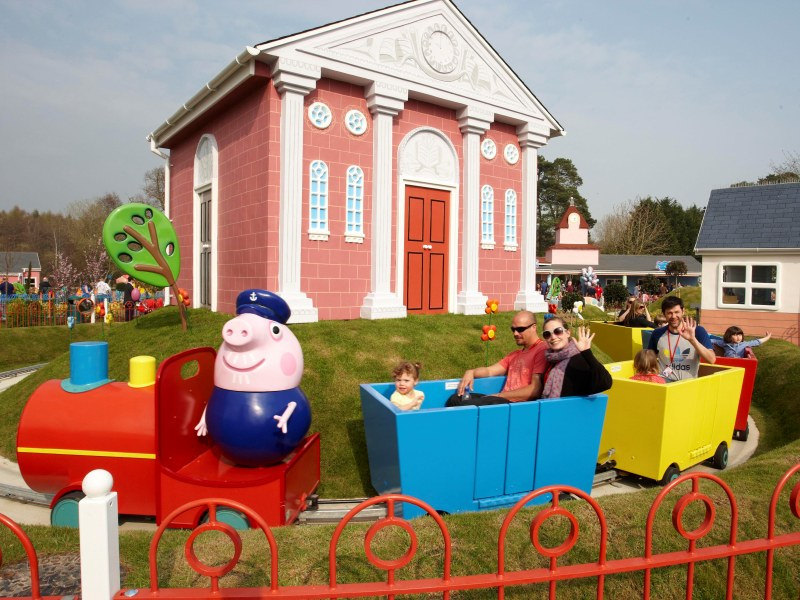
Grandpa Pig's Little Train Ride at Peppa Pig World.

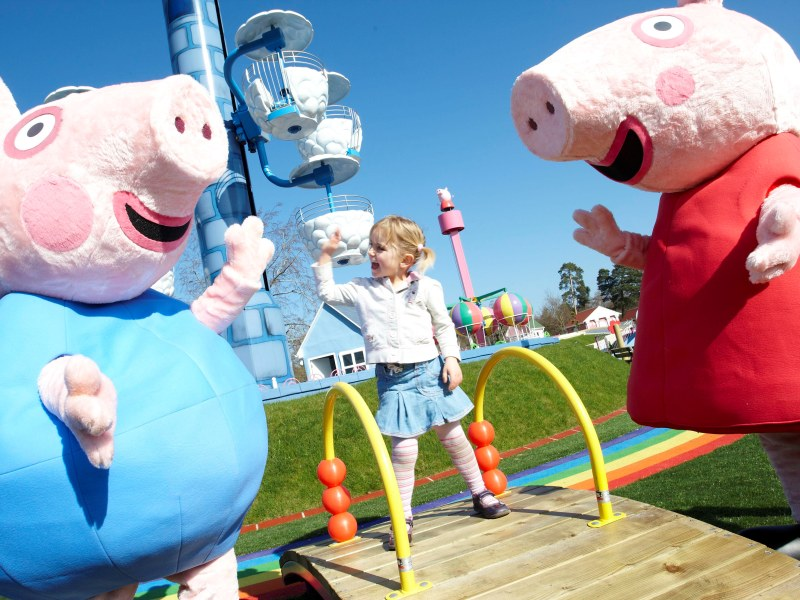
Peppa Pig and George in Peppa Pig World.

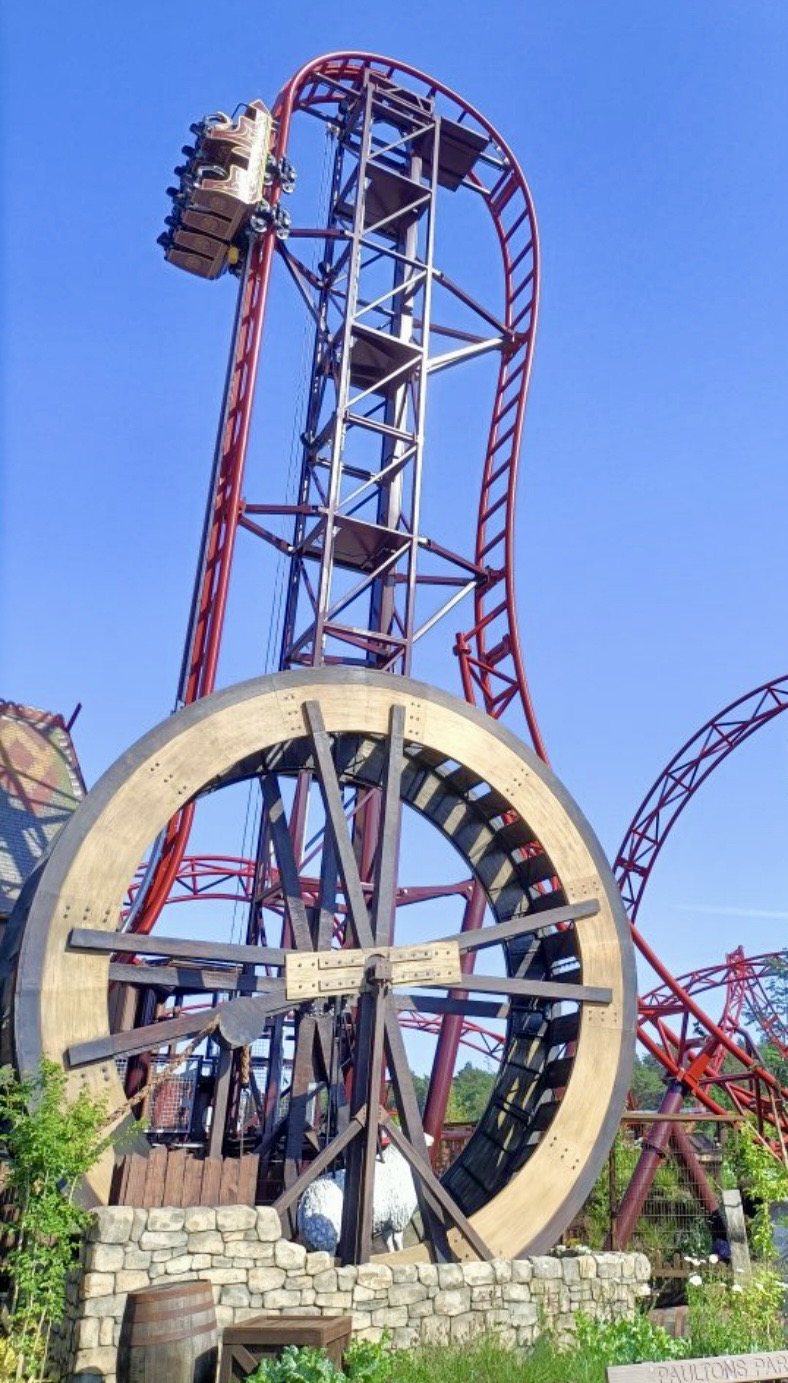
Drakon, Valgard: Realm of the Vikings

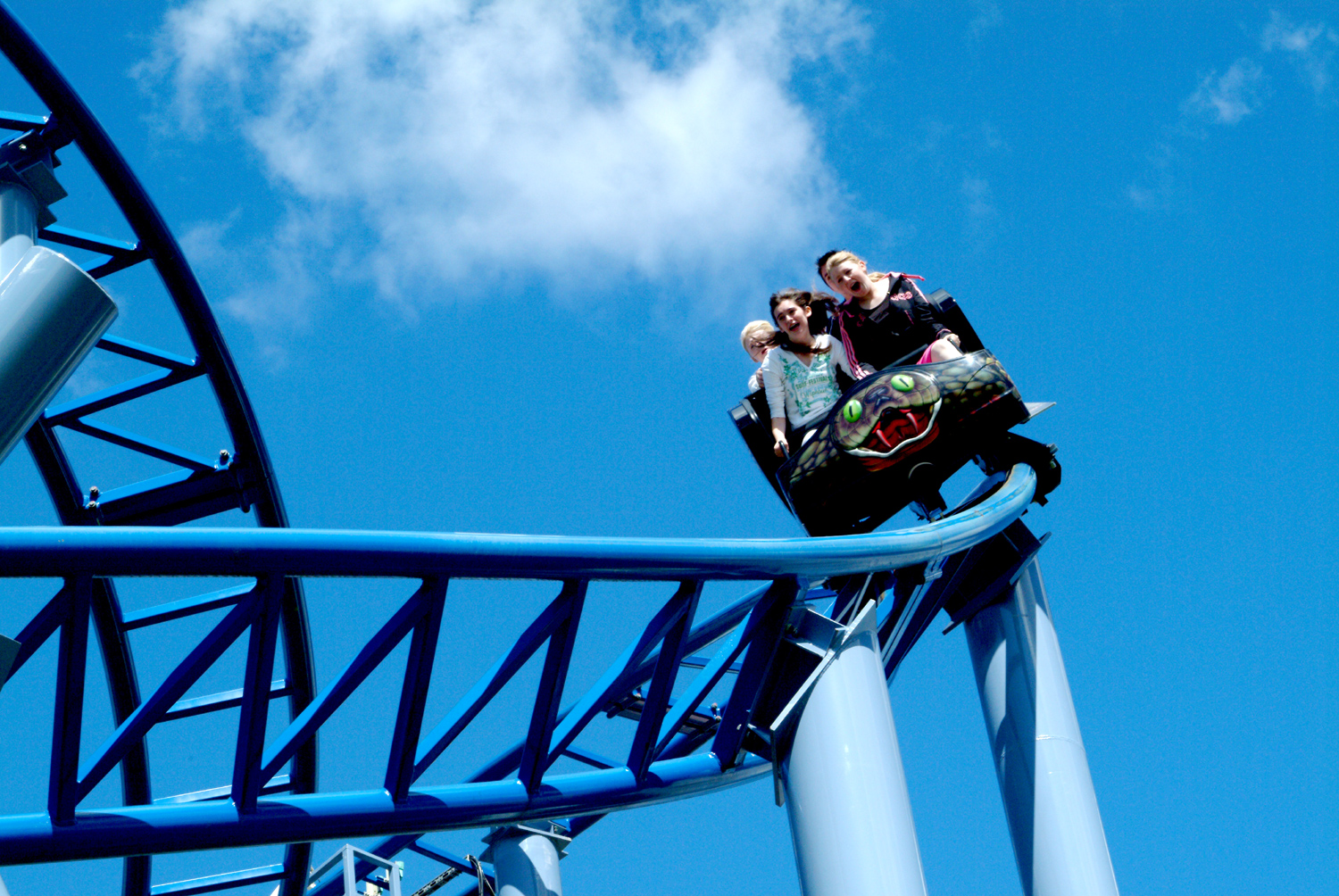
Cobra (Now Raven)

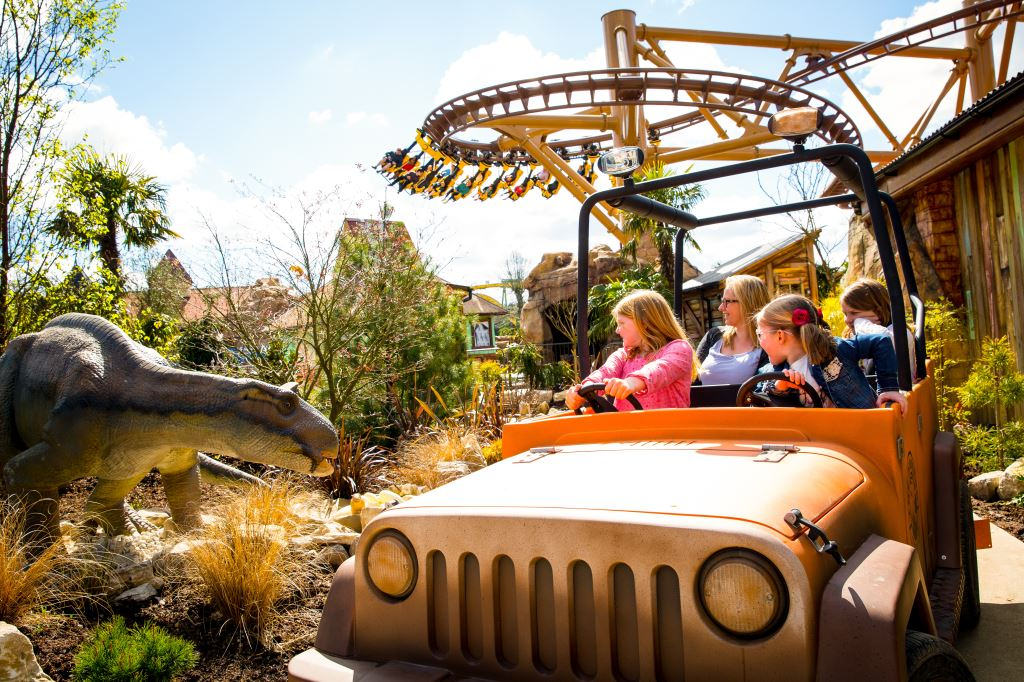
Lost Kingdom

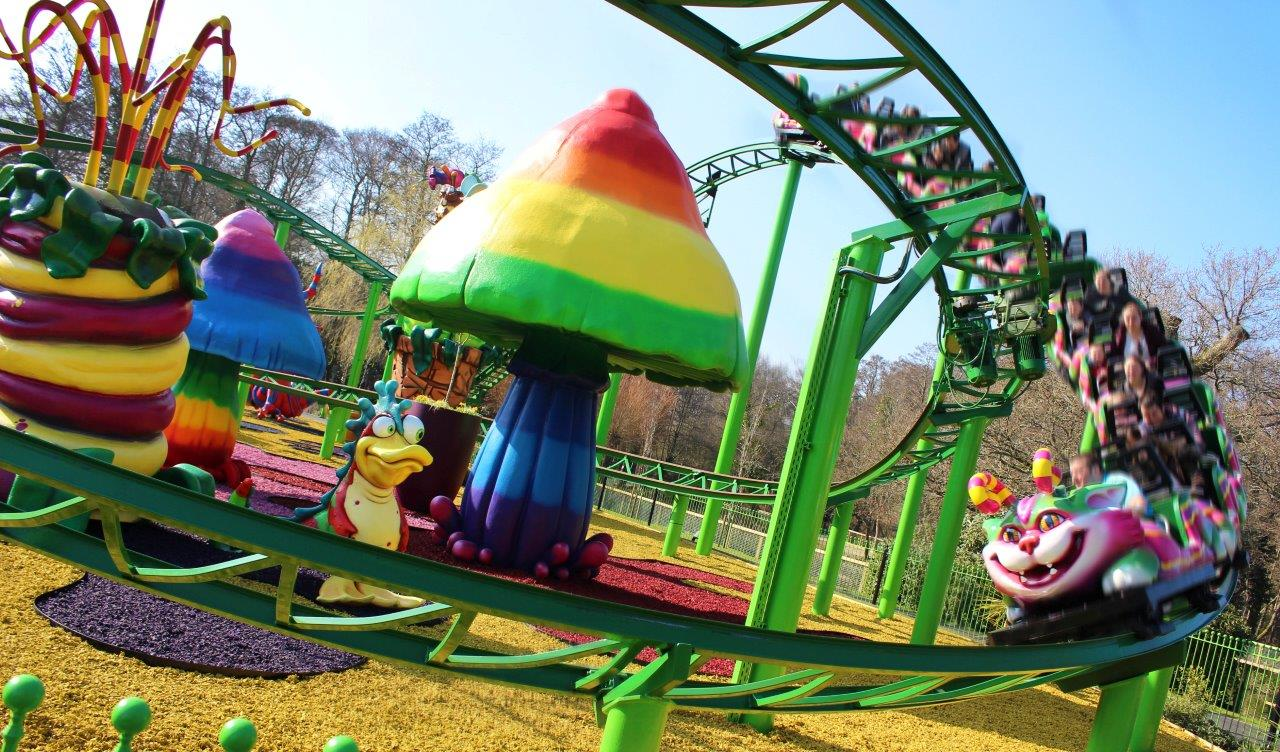
The Cat-o-Pillar coaster

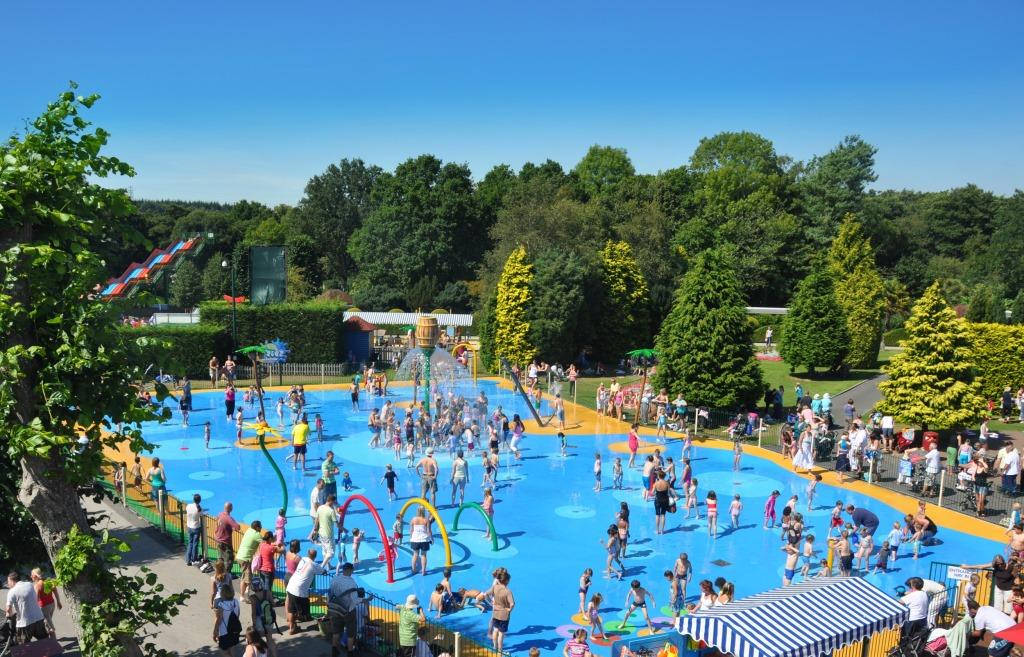
The Water Kingdom Splash park.

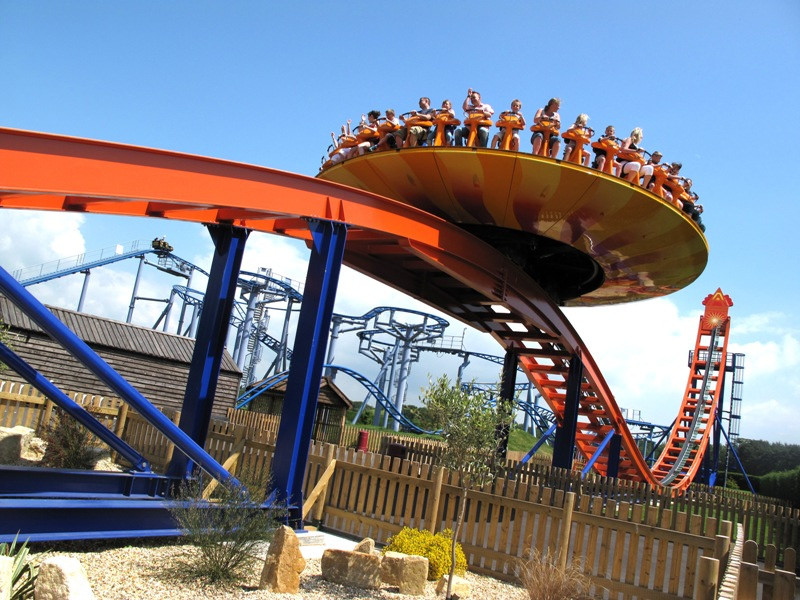
The Edge

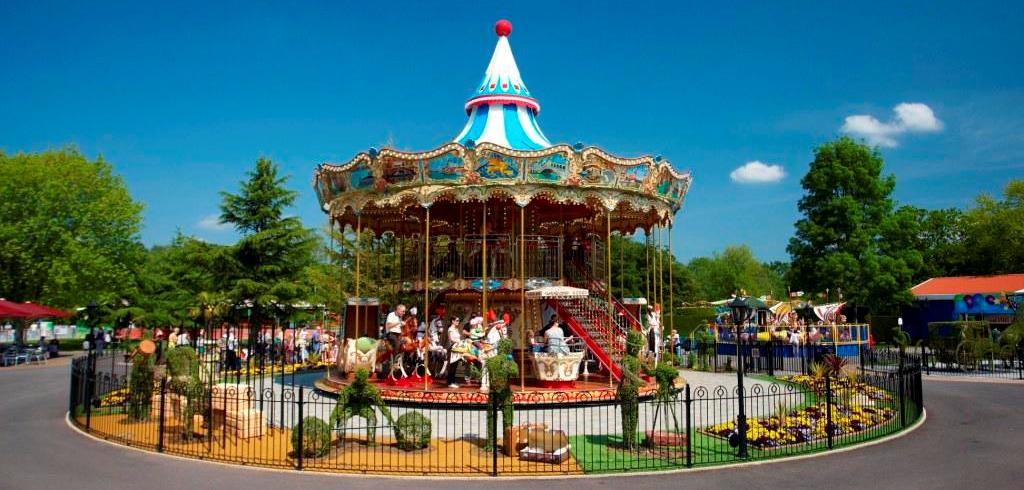
The Double Decker Victorian Carousel.

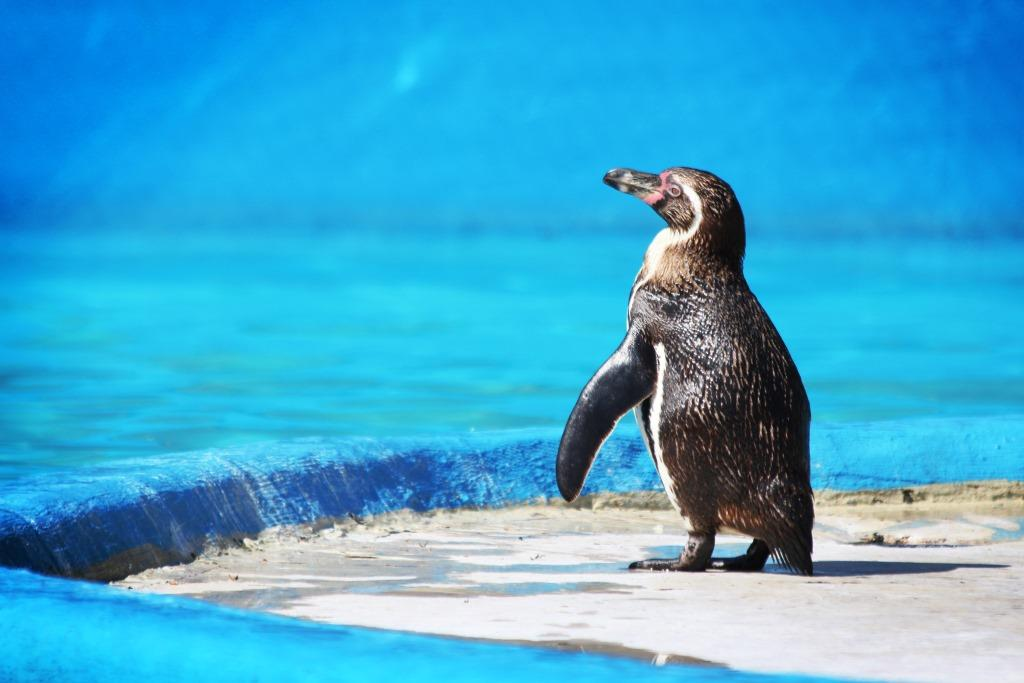
A Humboldt Penguin at the penquin enclosure

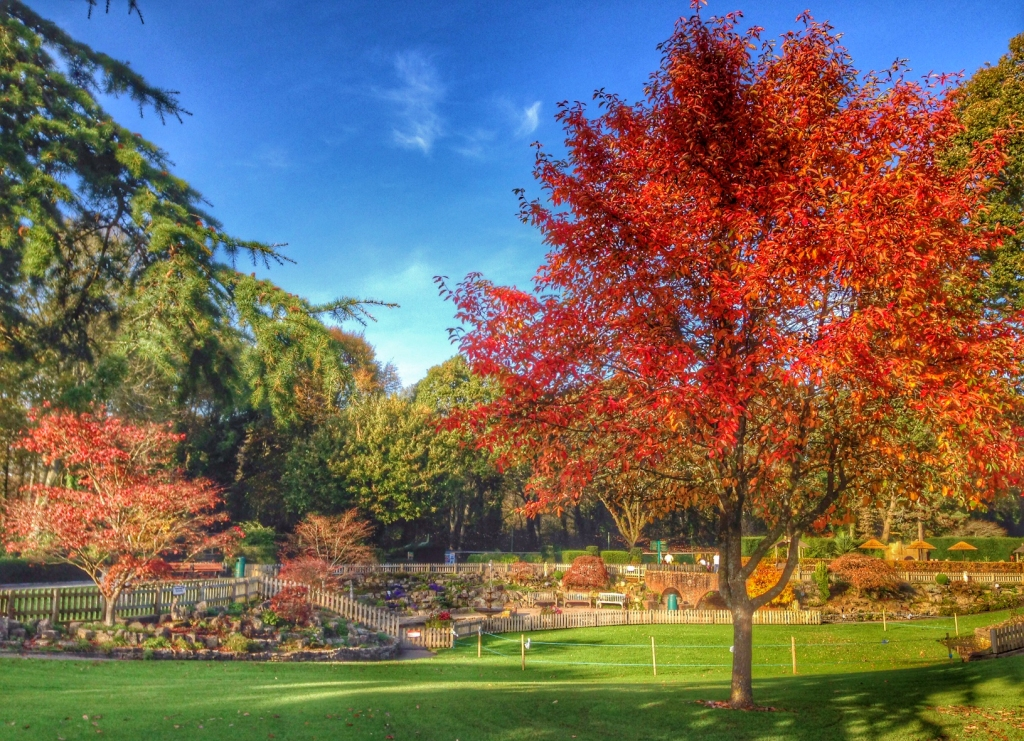
The Main Gardens

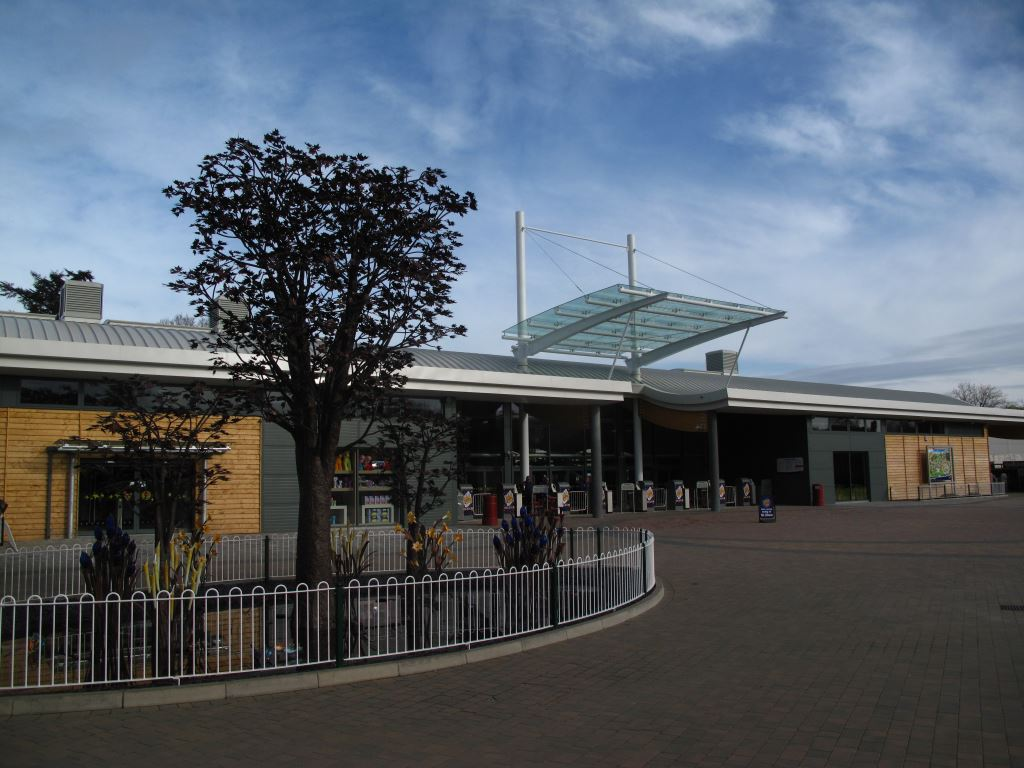
Park Entrance

== Rides and attractions ==
Paultons Park is split into various themed areas, composing of rides and attractions for the whole family to enjoy.

Attraction Key	Thrill Rides	Family Rides	Other

=== Tornado Springs ===
	Name	Opened	Manufacturer	Description
1	Storm Chaser	2021	Mack Rides	A Mack Rides Spinning Coaster, Sierra Sidewinder model. Themed around tornado catching, the ride has a compact and intense layout, appealing to families and thrill seekers alike. The ride is 19.5 m tall and reaches speeds of up to 59.4 km/h. Two trains with four cars per train. Riders are arranged two across in two rows for a total of sixteen riders per train. The minimum height to ride is 1.0 m.
2	Cyclonator	2021	Zamperla	A Zamperla Discovery 30 ride. Themed around harvesting crops for the residents of Tornado Springs, the ride features a circular gondola that rotates 360 degrees as it swings back and forth. The ride swings up to 25 m and features 30 outward-facing seats. The minimum height to ride is 1.2 m. Upon opening, the ride became the park's most significant investment in a thrill attraction to date.
3	Al's Auto Academy	2021	Formula K	A Formula K driving school ride. Themed around testing out the character of Al's 1950s style open-top mini streetcars. The minimum height to ride is 0.8 m and those over 13 years old cannot ride. An optional driving license can be purchased for an additional charge, after the experience.
4	Windmill Towers	2021	Zierer	Two Zierer Family Freefall Tower rides. Themed around providing power out in the crooked countryside, the rides bounce guests up and down. The attraction houses 10 riders per cycle, per tower. The minimum height to ride is 0.9 m.
5	Farmyard Flyer	2022	Zierer	A Zierer Custom Force roller coaster. Themed around a crazy aeroplane adventure, taking riders swooping up, down and around a 1950s farmland. The minimum height to ride is 0.9 m. The ride is an ideal first roller coaster, featuring some of the park's most intricate theming.
6	Buffalo Falls	2003 (2021)	Metallbau Emmeln	A Metallbau Emmeln Dinging Water Slide ride. Themed around the breath-taking white waters of the town's waterfall, the ride features three drops. The minimum height to ride is 0.9 m. The attraction was previously known as Wave Runner, before being incorporated into Tornado Springs in 2021.
7	Trekking Tractors	2007 (2021)	Metallbau Emmeln	A Metallbau Emmeln Tractor ride. Themed around the character of Farmer Flo's farm, where mischievous groundhogs who have taken up residence. There is no minimum height to ride. The attraction was remodelled for the 2021 season as part of Tornado Springs.
8	Rio Grande Train	1987 (2021)	Severn Lamb	A Severn Lamb Train ride. The classic Rio Grande loco take passengers on a delightful journey around the park. There is no minimum height to ride. One of the park's original attractions, the ride was remodelled and rerouted for the 2021 season, with the train being fully refurbished with onboard audio.
9	Junkyard Junction	2021	Paultons Park	A western-themed outdoor adventure play park for children, featuring climbing frames and slides.
10	Parking Lot Tots	2021	Paultons Park	A garage-themed outdoor adventure play park for young children, featuring climbing frames and slides.

=== Lost Kingdom ===
	Name	Opened	Manufacturer	Description
11	Flight of the Pterosaur	2016	Vekoma	Family Suspended Coaster; height limit 1.0M / age limit 4 years old, part of new land for 2016 – Lost Kingdom, train 2x10.
12	Velociraptor	2016	Vekoma	A custom version of Vekoma's Family Boomerang model, built as part of the new for 2016 Lost Kingdom; height limit 1m / age limit 4 years old.
13	Dino Chase	2003 (2016)	Zierer	Junior coaster; height limit 0.85m, small Tivoli model, train 2x6. Formerly known as The Flying Frog.
14	The Dinosaur Tour Co.	2016	Metallbau Emmeln	Drive through the Lost Kingdom on a Jurassic 4x4 expedition.
15	Boulder Dash	2016	Zamperla	Swirl and dodge between giant dinosaur eggs and boulders.
16	Splash Lagoon	2024	ABC Rides	A small log flume built on the site of the relocated Temple Heights.
17	Little Explorers	2016	UK Outdoor Play	A dinosaur-themed outdoor adventure play park area for young children, featuring climbing frames, slides and dinosaur footprints also, uncover rare fossils in the sand pit!
18	ALIVE! Dinosaur Encounter	2016	Paultons Park	Get up close and personal with Lost Kingdom's Jurassic inhabitants!
19	Discovery Trail	2016	Paultons Park	Take a stroll through our wooded trail as it weaves through trees and marshes. With interactive boards along the route and over 40 bird and bat boxes; what will you discover along the tranquil path?

=== Critter Creek ===
	Name	Opened	Manufacturer	Description
20	Cat-O-Pillar Coaster	2000 (2015)	Zierer	Junior coaster, 20 mph (32 km); height limit 90 cm, medium Tivoli model, train 2x13. Formerly known as Stinger.
21	Prof. Blast's Expedition Express	2015	Zamperla	Hop aboard the Expedition Express - a mini train trek ride through Professor Blast's world of critters and strange experiments.
22	Beastie Burrow	2015	Paultons Park	A real life bug emporium with insects, fish and lizards. Meet Eric the friendly Chameleon and see if you can spot the bright orange and white clown fish.

=== Peppa Pig World ===
	Name	Opened	Manufacturer	Description
23	Daddy Pig's Car Ride	2011	Metallbau Emmeln	A convoy/car ride that manoeuvres around a road track.
24	George's Dinosaur Adventure	2011	Metallbau Emmeln	A themed monorail-type ride with rocking 'dinosaur' cars. Height limit 85 cm.
25	Grampy Rabbit's Sailing Club	2018	Mack Rides	A water tour ride in small boats.
26	Grandpa Pig's Boat Trip	2011	Metallbau Emmeln	A circular-carousel-type ride.
27	Grandpa Pig's Little Train	2011	Metallbau Emmeln	A small train ride.
28	Miss Rabbit's Helicopter Flight	2011	Zierer	A Helicopter-themed Ferris Wheel ride.
29	Peppa's Big Balloon Ride	2011	Zierer	A balloon themed tower ride.
30	The Queen's Flying Coach Ride	2018	Metallbau Emmeln	An elevated Monorail type ride that takes you around Peppa Pig World.
31	Windy Castle Ride	2011	Metallbau Emmeln	A Big Wheel-type ride.
32	George's Spaceship Playzone	2011	Paultons Park	An indoor play area.
33	Meet Peppa Pig and Friends	2011	Paultons Park	A Meet-and-Greet attraction where attendees can meet Peppa Pig and George Pig, sometimes with other characters as well.
34	Mr Potato's Playzone	2011	Paultons Park	An outdoor play area.
35	Muddy Puddles	2011	Paultons Park	A water play area.

=== Main Park ===
	Name	Opened	Manufacturer	Description
36	Edge	2009	Zamperla	A Mega Disk'O Coaster. 1.2m minimum height and 6 years old to ride.
37	The Pirate Ship	2001	Metallbau Emmeln	Swinging pirate ship ride reaching up to 45 degrees each way. 90 cm minimum height to ride.
38	Kontiki	2005	Zierer	Similar to the Pirate Ship, however it runs on a track & rotates. 90 cm minimum height to ride.
39	The Sky Swinger	2008	Zierer	Zierer 'Wave Swinger' ride consisting of 8 pairs of double seats and 24 single seats on chains swinging out whilst the ride spins and lifts you high into the air. You must be 1m tall to ride, children under 1.2m or under 7 years old must sit in a double seat with an adult.
40	The Victorian Carousel	2014	Bertazzon	A double-decker set of Gallopers built by Italian manufacturer Bertazzon.
41	Viking Boats	2001	Zierer	Small rotating boat ride themed on the Viking longboats.
42	Tea Cup Ride	1997	Modern Products	Spinning tea cup ride decorated with fruit.
43	Seal Falls	2002	Zamperla	Younger version of the Splash Lagoon, small drop and a mini igloo tunnel. Will be rethemed to Little Serpents when Serpent's Curse opens in 2027 and will also soon form part of Valgard.
44	Digger Ride	2002	Sartori	Track ride themed around a building site.
45	Ghostly Manor	2025	Mack Rides	Indoor 'Gameplay Theatre' attraction. Located in the building that previously housed the 4D Cinema. Guests explore Dr. Kinley's manor, "which houses a unique exhibition of apparitions and haunted artefacts".
46	Water Kingdom	2009	Paultons Park	Water splash play park with water jets, large tipping buckets, fountains and super soakers.

=== Valgard: Realm of the Vikings ===
	Name	Opened	Manufacturer	Description
47	Drakon	2026	Gerstlauer	A custom-layout Gerstlauer Eurofighter, featuring a vertical lift hill at 75 ft tall, 2 inversions including a zero-g stall and a 1.25m height restriction. The ride intertwines with Raven's layout, and was Paultons' first inverting rollercoaster.
48	Raven	2006	Gerstlauer	Bobsled Coaster (car 2+2), reaches 29 mph (46 km) on a 1476 ft long track (450m) and a height of 54 ft (17m); To ride you must be 1.1m accompanied and 1.3m and 8 years old to ride alone. Bobsled model 450/4. Max G force is 3. The ride was installed by Ride Entertainment Group, who handles all of Gerstlauer's operations in the Western Hemisphere. Operating as 'Cobra' until 7 September 2025, it reopened in May 2026 as Raven, featured a new green colour scheme and upgraded theming.
49	Vild Swing	2026	ART Engineering	A 12m tall ART Engineering Wild Swing, the first of its type in the UK.
50	The Orchard	2026	TouchWood Play	Viking-themed play area.
51	Serpent's Curse	2027	Mack Rides	A custom-built Mack Rides water coaster, forming Phase 2 of Valgard: Realm of the Vikings, opening in 2027 on the previous site of the Go Karts.

=== Former attractions ===
Name	Opened	Closed	Manufacturer	Description	Replacement
Magma	2012	2025	SBF Visa Group	25m Twisting Drop Tower, volcanic theme, height limit 1.1m. Closed on the 8 September 2025 and relocated to Crealy Theme Park & Resort) renamed Pirates Plummet.	
Dragon Roundabout	2001	2024	Zierer	Roundabout ride; height limit 90 cm. Relocated to Funland Hayling Island in 2025 and renamed as Dragons Rush.	
Go Karts	1998	2024	Formula K	Petrol karts in a circuit. Located next to Magma. Upcharge ride.	
Raging River Ride	1999	2024	Reverchon	225 m log flume, two steep drops, the higher of which is 11m tall; height limit 95 cm. Relocated to Dreamland Margate for the 2025 season.	
4D Cinema	2013	2022	Simworx	An indoor cinema with 4D effects.	Ghostly Manor
Temple Heights	2005	2022	Zamperla	A magic carpet ride. It was remodeled in 2016. It was sold to Funland Hayling Island and reopened as "Aztec Falls" the following year.	Splash Lagoon
Astroglide	1989	2014	Harry Steer Engineering	A Giant Slide that was removed to make way for the Lost Kingdom area. The ride was relocated to Dreamland Margate for its reopening and renamed to "Born Slippy", trading until 2019.	
Jumping Bean	2004	2017	Moser Rides	A family Drop Tower that operated alongside Jumping Jack. It was relocated to Animal Farm Family Theme Park in 2018 and has been operating at Fantasy Island in Essex since 2020.	
Jumping Jack	2004	2017	Zamperla	A junior Drop Tower that operated alongside Jumping Bean. It is smaller than the slightly larger Jumping Bean and was designed for younger children.	
Flying Saucer	1992	2015	Modern Products	A Major Orbit ride. Was relocated to Funland Hayling Island for two years, and later Willows Activity Farm, but its current location is unknown.	
Land of the Dinosaurs	1988	2015		A walkthrough featuring statues of dinosaurs and other prehistoric animals. It was removed prior to the opening of Lost Kingdom, and the Discovery trail is now in its place.	
Rabbit Ride	1988	2014	Modern Products	A tracked ride with Rabbit-themed cars. It was scrapped following its removal from the park.	
Ladybird Ride	1999	2012	Modern Products	A Roundabout ride. It currently operates as a traveling ride owned by an independent operator.	
Whirlycopter	1998	2004	Modern Products	A Junior Ferris Wheel. Was relocated to New Palace and Adventureland until 2017 under the slightly altered name of "Whirlycopters", although its current whereabouts are unknown following its removal.	
Runaway Train	1992	1999	Big Country Motioneering	A Family Roller Coaster, and was the park's first Roller Coaster in general. Was relocated to Dunes Leisure Family Fun Fair and was scrapped in 2011.	The Stinger now known as The Cat-O-Pillar Coaster

== Animals ==
- Wild Lands- home to African birds including turacos, Cape teal, white-faced whistling ducks and guineafowl. Formerly known as Little Africa.
- Meerkat Manor- an enclosure including indoor and outdoor areas for meerkats.
- Penguin Pool- Humboldt penguins in a pool with underwater viewing areas, housed in the former bumper boat pool. There are feeding sessions with keepers daily.
- Birds of Prey- including the great grey owl.
- Hornbills- a large hornbill collection including silver-cheeked, black-casqued wattled, trumpeter, Von der Deckens and red-billed hornbills.
- Tropical Birds- including laughing thrush, Spreo and starlings.
- Flamingos and Pelicans in enclosures.
- Tortoises- including Aldabra tortoises that arrived at the park in 1995.
- Ring-tailed Lemurs- an enclosure consisting of a troop of lemurs, situated next-door to the flamingos.

== Gardens ==
- The Main Garden located on the site of Paultons House, which no longer remains.
- Lake & Weir – horseshoe-shaped lake fed by a tributary of the River Test.
- Tropical Plants including a Wollemi pine which was thought to be extinct until discovered in Australia in 1994.
- Rockery – parts of the old cellars of the original Paultons house that have been retained.
- Spring Garden with snowdrops and drifts of yellow daffodils in the spring.
- Rhododendrons and Azaleas blooming in late spring.
- Trekking Tractor Garden – a farm garden created in the middle of a ride with a vegetable plot.
- Donoughmore Cross monument situated on the far side of the lake marks the site of what was once a pets' cemetery.
- Jungle Falls – African-themed Jungle Falls Garden, with a topiary elephant, giraffe and crocodile.
- Snakes and Ladders Garden with a large cobra made from 5000 Sedums.
- Anne and John's Garden – opened in 2008 as part of the entrance plaza, enhanced in 2015 with the addition of a glass fountain 7 history of Paultons digital screens.
- The Floating Globe – a kugel ball which is also part of the entrance plaza developed for the 2008 season, it is the largest of its type in the UK, weighing over 6 tonnes and 1.5 metres in diameter.
- Water Wheel – a genuine Victorian Brestshot waterwheel which drives a sawmill and was part of the original Paultons Estate (the land on which the park is now situated).

=== Planning permission issues ===
In 2009, Paultons Park were told they may have to move two of their biggest rides (The Cobra and Edge) after an application to grant them retrospective planning permission was turned down by the national park planning committee by seven votes to five. The area where these rides were situated is designated 'Country Park' and not 'Amusement Park' in planning terms, whereas all other areas of the park are now recognised as an amusement park and therefore have permitted development rights.

After a separate application (for the Cobra only) was made it was announced on 22 December 2009 that The Cobra (The park's biggest ride) had now been granted retrospective permission and could remain in its current location.

Another planning application was lodged with the New Forest National Park Planning Authority to retain the Edge ride. The application received public support and Paultons were granted permission by the New Forest NPA to retain the Edge ride in its current location on 16 March 2010.

== Awards ==
- Visit England Gold Accolade 2022
- TripAdvisor Travellers Choice Award - No.1 Theme Park in the UK, No.8 in Europe and No.24 in the World
- TripAdvisor Travellers Choice Award – No. 1 Theme Park in the UK and No.11 in Europe 2017
- TripAdvisor Travellers Choice Award – No. 1 Theme Park in the UK and No.6 in Europe 2016
- TripAdvisor Travellers Choice Award – No. 2 Theme Park in the UK and No.6 in Europe 2015
- TripAdvisor Travellers Choice Award – No. 1 Theme Park in the UK 2014
- TripAdvisor Certificate of Excellence 2015
- TripAdvisor Certificate of Excellence 2013
- Netmums Best UK Theme Park for Family Fun 2013
- Netmums Best UK Theme Park for Pre-Schoolers 2013
- Netmums Best UK Theme Park Kids Favourite Category 2013
- Loo of the Year 2021
