= Storm chaser =

Storm chaser or stormchaser may refer to:

== Weather ==
- Storm chasing, the pursuit of any severe weather condition
- Storm chaser, colloquial term referring to scammers who enter areas recently afflicted by disasters offering false or shoddy services
- Storm Chaser, a book by Warren Faidley, professional storm chasing journalist
- Storm Chasers (TV series), a documentary reality television series on the Discovery Channel

== Entertainment ==
- Storm Chaser (EP), a 2007 EP by Erasure
- Wind Chaser, a roller coaster at the Kentucky Kingdom amusement park previously known as Storm Chaser
- Storm Chaser (Paultons Park), a roller coaster at the Paultons Park amusement park
- Omaha Storm Chasers, an American baseball team
- Stormchaser (novel), a 1999 children's novel by Paul Stewart and Chris Riddell
- Stormchaser (album), a 2008 album by Light This City
- StoRMChaser, a Danish jazz musical group
