= Big Dipper (Luna Park Sydney, 2021) =

Roller coaster in New South Wales, Australia

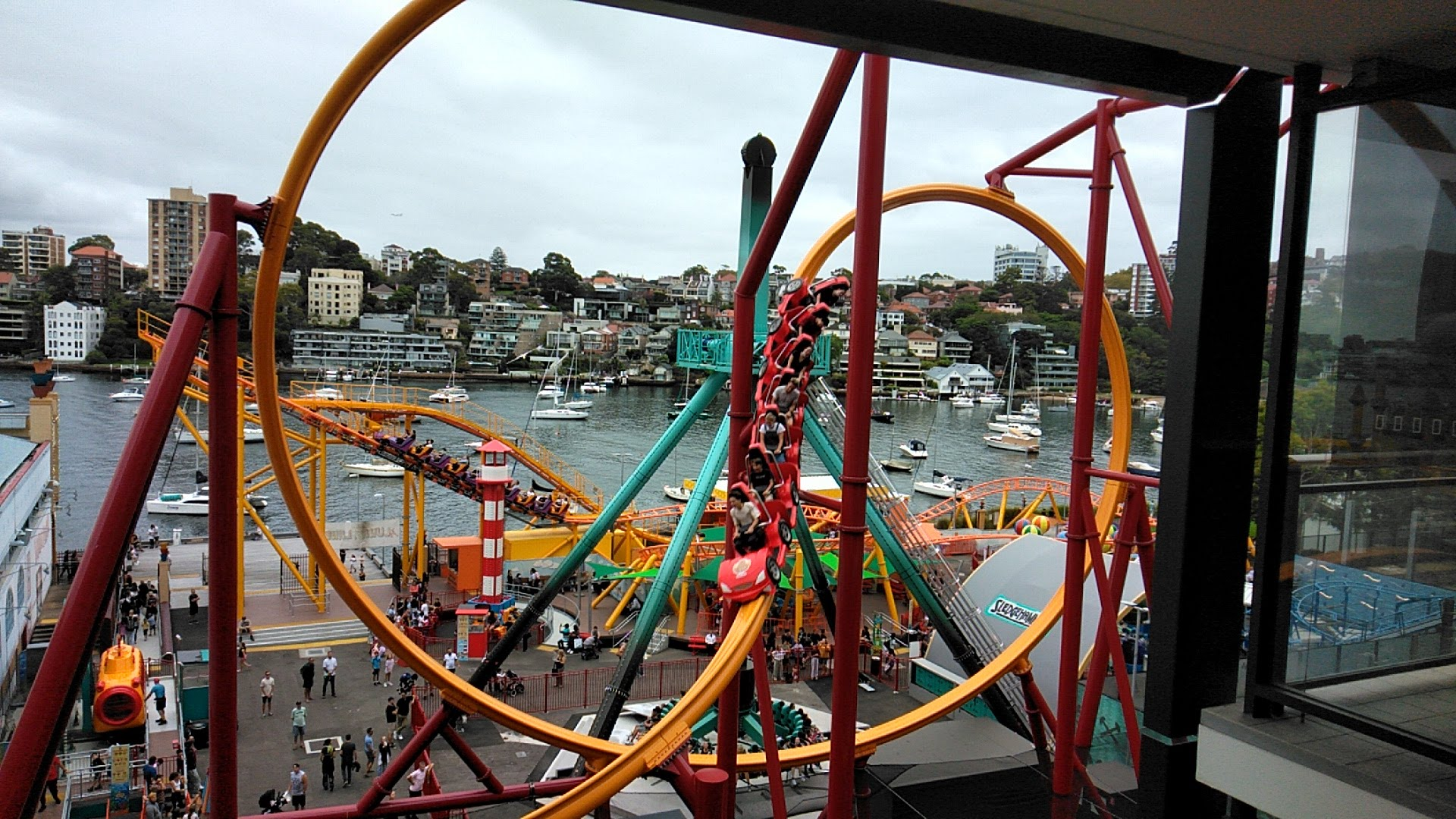

Luna Park Sydney
- Location: Luna Park Sydney
- Coordinates: 33°50′51″S 151°12′35″E
- Status: Operating
- Opening date: 26 December 2021
- Replaced: Big Dipper (1995-2001); Big Dipper (1935-1979)

General statistics
- Manufacturer: Intamin
- Model: Hot Racer
- Height: 25 m (82 ft)
- Speed: 72 km/h (45 mph)
- Inversions: 2
- Restraint style: Lap bar
- Height restriction: 132 cm (4 ft 4 in)
- Trains: 2 trains with 7 cars; riders arranged 1 across in a single row for a total of 7 riders per train
- Big Dipper at RCDB

Big Dipper is a launched single-rail roller coaster at Luna Park Sydney, in New South Wales, Australia. The ride opened on 26 December 2021, as part of a $30 million investment into the park. It is the prototype of Intamin's Hot Racer model, the ride being the world's first launched single-rail coaster. Big Dipper was named after two roller coasters that came before it, one wooden and one steel.

== Background ==
=== Predecessors ===
Big Dipper is named after two roller coasters of the same name that both operated in its spot. The original Big Dipper was constructed in 1930 for Luna Park Glenelg to a design by Miller & Baker Inc, and was relocated to Sydney in 1935. The ride was continually Luna Park's most popular attraction up until the park's closure in 1979 as a result of the Ghost Train fire. Big Dipper was demolished in 1981 when new management took over the park.

Luna Park was redeveloped through the early 1990s, reopening in 1995. The park's new main attraction was a steel roller coaster designed by Arrow Dynamics, also named Big Dipper. The ride was continually plagued by issues due to the sound generated by the ride and legal action taken upon the park by local residents. As a result, the ride had significant operating restrictions imposed upon it, leading to a drop in attendance which contributed to the park's closure 13 months later. The ride was sold to Dreamworld in 2001 where it currently operates as Gold Coaster.

=== Inception and opening ===
In 2017, Luna Park announced that it would be investing $20 million in the addition of six new rides. The first ride of these plans was Volaré, a Preston & Barbieri Wave Swinger. Initial construction applications filed in 2017 were denied, and the state government imposed new restrictions on ride additions to Luna Park. These restrictions were lifted in late 2018, and Volaré was finally able to open in 2019.

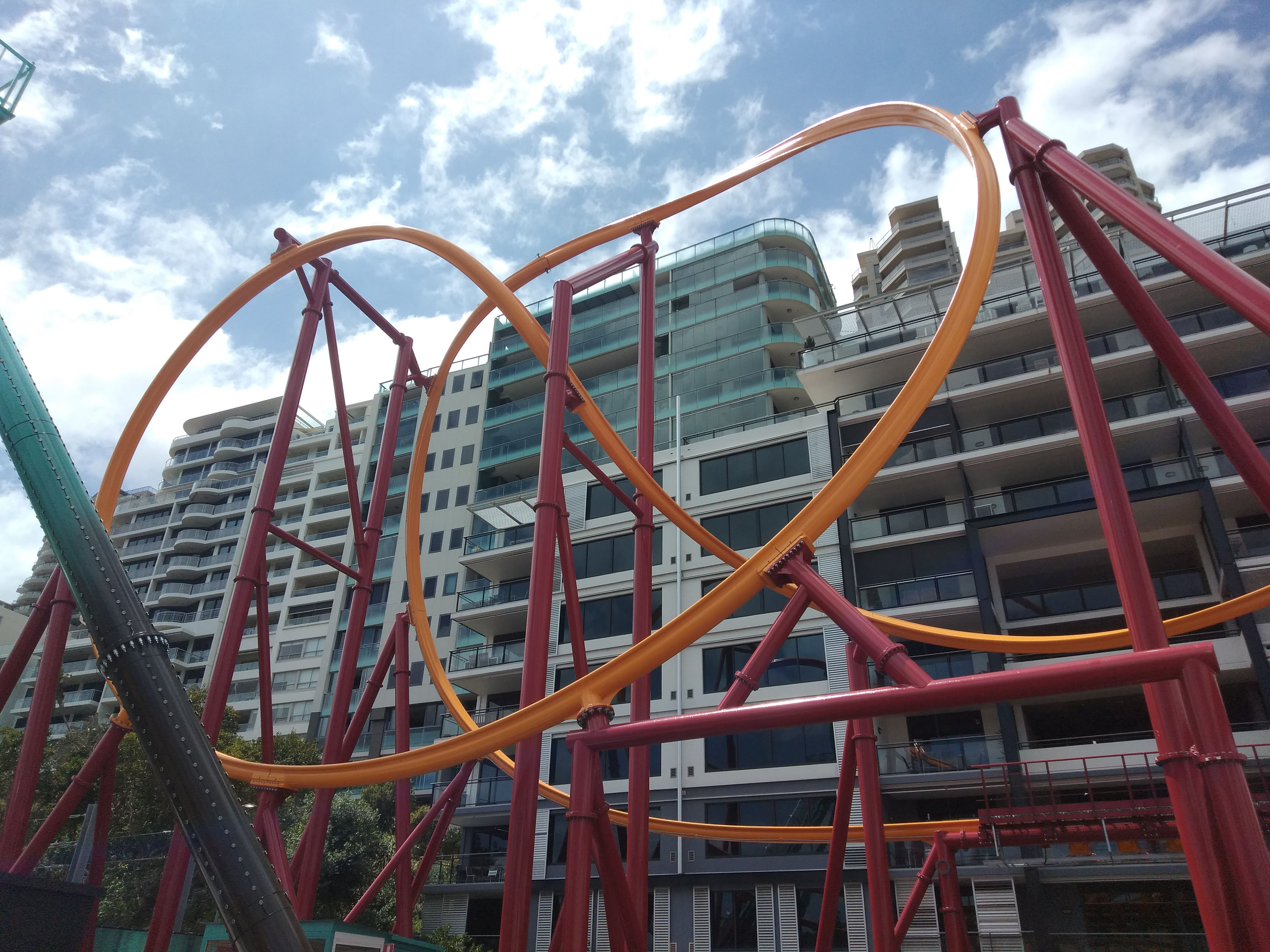
Big Dipper's non-inverted loop and sidewinder

In July 2020, Intamin showcased four new rollercoaster models, many of which were based on the single-rail concept. The Hot Racer was announced to be a thrill-focused, multi-launch model.

In the midst of the COVID-19 pandemic, Luna Park announced revised expansion plans, and it would be investing $30 million into nine new rides. Amidst these would be three new roller coasters, one of which being an Intamin Hot Racer named Big Dipper. Construction began in mid 2021, and the ride opened on Boxing Day of that year.

== Ride experience ==
=== Queue ===
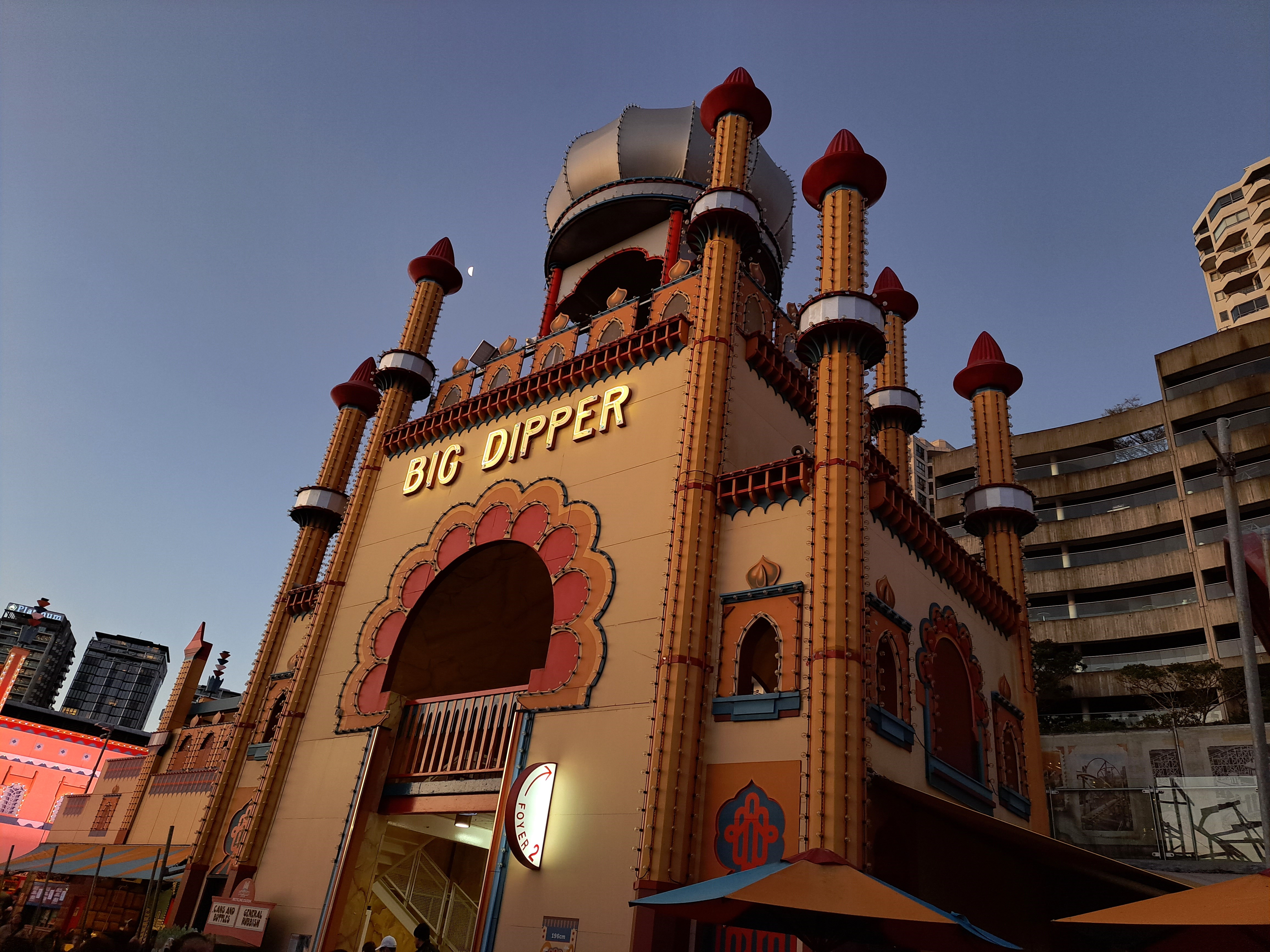
The ride's entrance building was constructed in 1994, and restored in 2016.

Riders enter the queue through an ornate tower on the park's midway and ascend stairs surrounded by artworks of the previous Big Dippers, plaques explaining the history of the rides, and a preserved car from the 1935 ride. Riders ascend a second staircase, and travel over a metal bridge which crosses the ride's first launch and banked turn. Following more stairs downwards is a switchback queue surrounded by historical photographs of Luna Park. Riders ascend stairs once more, towards the ticket scanner and into the station.

=== Layout ===
The ride begins with a left turn out of the station, leading straight into the first tyre driven launch, which accelerates trains to 50 km/h (31 mph). The train turns left and passes through a zig-zag double down before reaching the second launch, which takes trains up to the top speed of 72 km/h (45 mph). Directly out of the second launch is the ride's tallest element, a 25 metres (82 ft) non-inverted loop, followed closely by the ride's first inversion, a sidewinder. The ride then heads back the way it came, passing through an airtime hill directly over the second launch, and travels through a downwards sloped S-turn. The train then traverses a wave turn circling the queue, followed by a corkscrew. After a final left turn, the train reaches the final brake run.

=== Trains ===
Big Dipper has two trains. The trains utilise an inline (single-file) seating layout, with 1 seat per car, allowing for a capacity of 7 riders per train. The trains utilise Intamin's modern over-the-shoulder lap bar design seen on many of their modern coasters. As Big Dipper is the prototype of its model, the trains are in their "stock" appearance, themed to racecars.

== See also ==
- 2021 in amusement parks
