= Snake River Expedition =

Riverboat attraction at Cedar Point

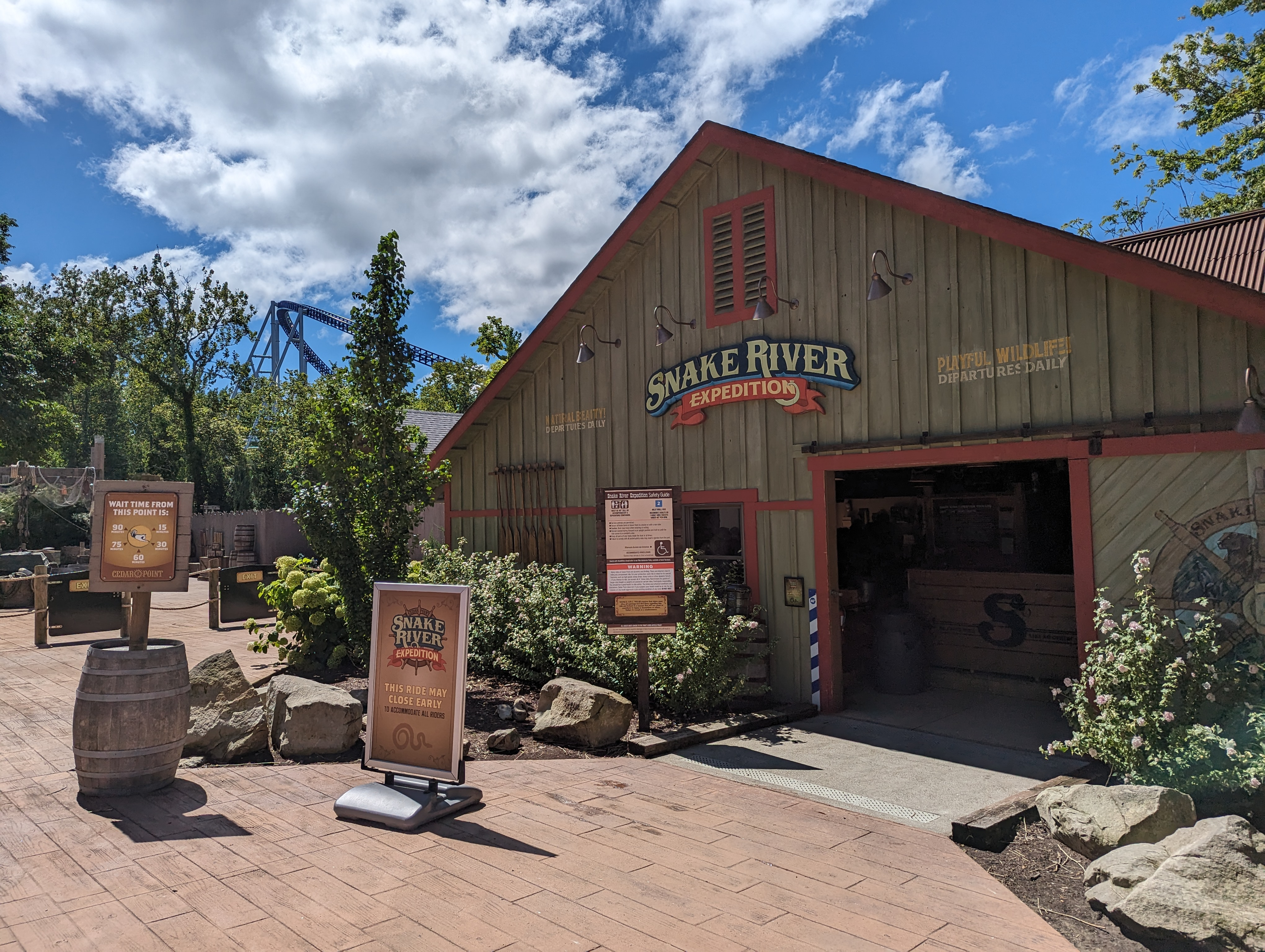

Cedar Point
- Area: Gemini Midway
- Coordinates: 41.484831°N 82.687613°W
- Status: Closed
- Opening date: May 29, 2021
- Closing date: September 4, 2023
- Replaced: Paddlewheel Excursions

Ride statistics
- Vehicle type: Riverboat
- Vehicles: 4
- Rows: 6
- Riders per row: 1–2
- Supervision: Required if under 46 inches (120 cm)
- Wheelchair accessible

Snake River Expedition was a riverboat attraction at Cedar Point in Sandusky, Ohio. The attraction took guests on a tour around the Cedar Point lagoon, and the experience combined live actors and animatronics. Snake River Expedition was scheduled to open for the 2020 season. However, it was postponed to 2021 by the onset of the COVID-19 pandemic. The attraction opened to the public on May 29, 2021, and operated on a seasonal basis through Labor Day.

== History ==
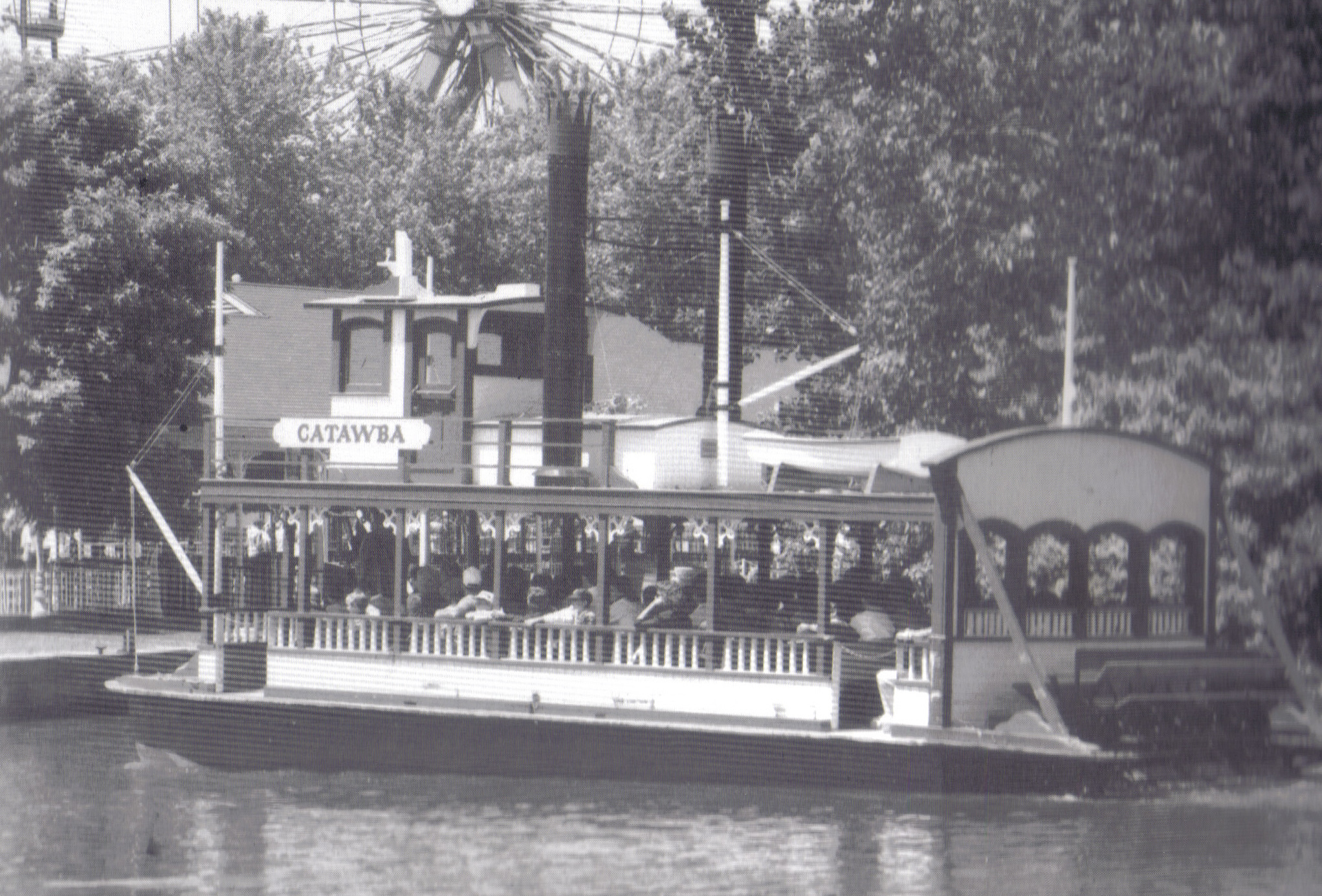
Cedar Point's Western Cruise, later renamed to the Paddlewheel Excursions, and the Giant Wheel in the early 1970s.

The Riverboat Cruises paddleboat attraction originally opened at Cedar Point in 1961, where guests were taken on a relaxing voyage around the lagoons in the center of the Cedar Point peninsula, and scenes depicting early, rural Americana. The journey was often humorously narrated by the boat's captain. It was renamed to Western Cruise in 1964, then Paddlewheel Excursions in 1986, and the ride course was significantly altered for the 2003 season to accommodate Top Thrill Dragster. Paddlewheel Excursions was retired after the 2011 season, due to rising fuel and maintenance costs, and the attraction's docking area was re-used for Dinosaurs Alive! in 2012.

At the end of the 2010s, Cedar Point began preparing to celebrate their 150th anniversary in 2020. In addition to the festivities, the park planned to bring an older attraction back into commission, and the former Paddlewheel Excursions fit the bill. On December 11, 2019 – 150 days from the park's planned opening date of May 9, 2020 – Cedar Point announced their full offerings for the 150th anniversary celebration, including Snake River Expedition, a themed reincarnation of the Paddlewheel Excursions. Snake River Expedition would take riders around the Cedar Point lagoons in live riverboats under the guidance of the charismatic Trapper Dan, smuggling unknown cargo to safer waters.

Snake River Expedition would have begun public operations alongside the 150th anniversary celebrations on May 9, 2020, if not for the impact of the COVID-19 pandemic. On the planned date, instead of the ideal park opening, Cedar Point postponed the debut of Snake River Expedition and all 150th festivities likewise, pushing them back to the 2021 season amid an uncertain reopening timeline. Banking on a successful joint lawsuit against the state of Ohio, Cedar Point reopened for the 2020 season on July 8 with new COVID restrictions and capacity limits in place, while the completed Snake River Expedition remained dormant for the year. The boats were first lowered and tested in the water in September 2020.

In 2021, the ride was scheduled to open on May 28, 2021. However, it did not open on that date due to severe weather conditions that later closed the park early. Snake River Expedition managed to successfully open the next day.

== Ride description ==
Much like its predecessor, Snake River Expedition took riders on a tour through the lagoon, and navigated much of the same route. Guests accompanied Trapper Dan, who was smuggling unknown cargo through risky waters. The experience contained a mix of live actors, animatronics, and physical sets. The boats were driven manually by a ride operator (in character with the setting) instead of being guided by an underwater track. Hence, the nature of the attraction was much different than Disney's Jungle Cruise or Universal Studio's Jaws: The Ride.
