= Storm Chaser (Paultons Park) =

Steel spinning roller coaster at Paultons Park

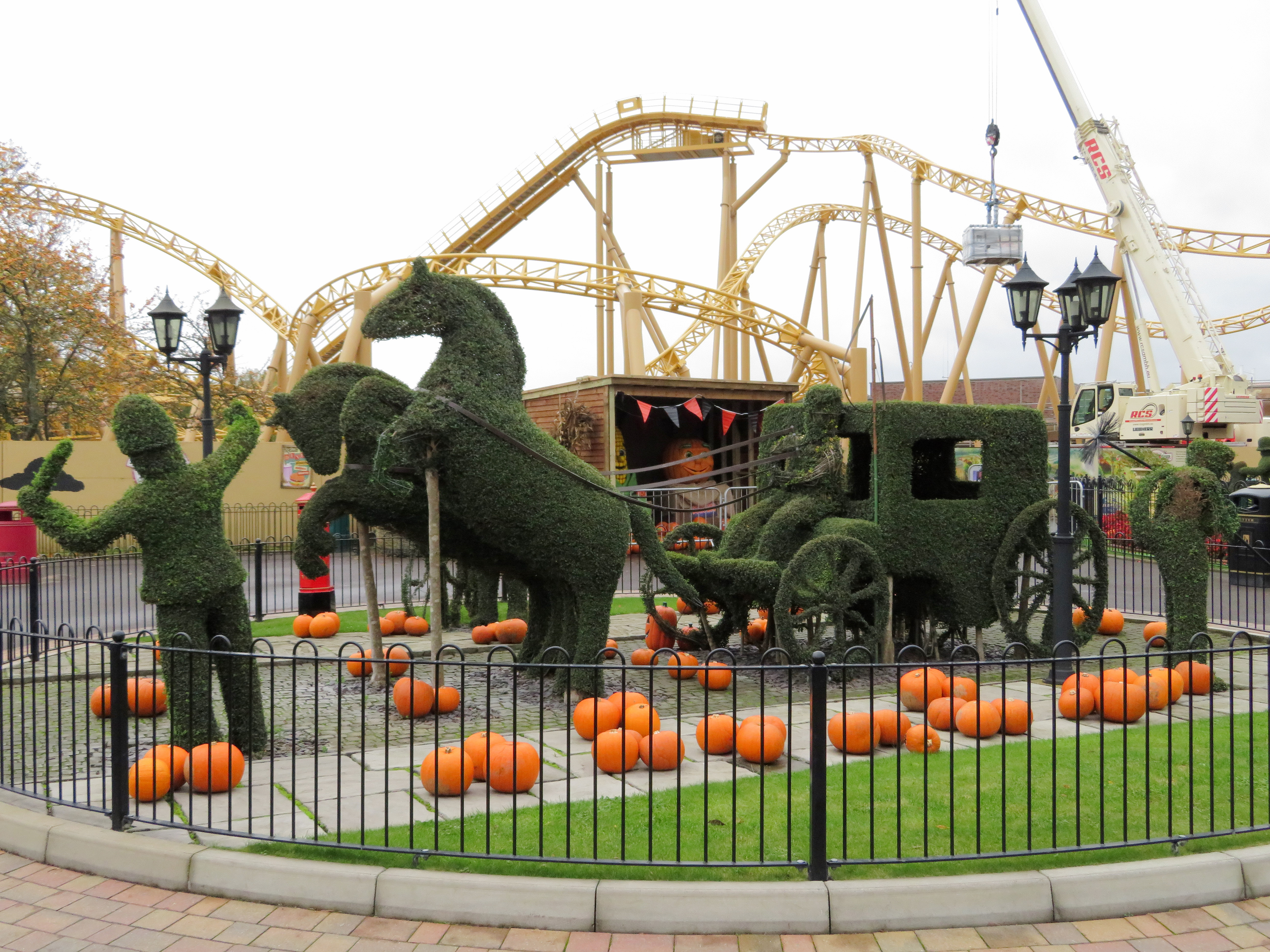

Paultons Park
- Location: Paultons Park
- Park section: Tornado Springs
- Coordinates: 50.949014°N 1.550532°W
- Status: Operating
- Opening date: 12 April 2021
- Cost: £4.5 million

General statistics
- Type: Steel – Spinning
- Manufacturer: Mack Rides
- Model: Spinning Coaster / Sierra Sidewinder
- Lift/launch system: Chain lift hill
- Height: 65.6 ft (20.0 m)
- Inversions: 0
- Height restriction: 100 cm (3 ft 3 in)
- Trains: 2 trains with 4 cars; riders arranged 2 across in 2 rows for a total of 16 riders per train
- Website: Official website
- Storm Chaser at RCDB

Storm Chaser is a steel spinning roller coaster located at Paultons Park in Hampshire, England. The coaster debuted alongside the new £12 million Tornado Springs area of the park on 12 April, 2021. Storm Chaser and Tornado Springs were initially intended to debut for the 2020 season, but were postponed to 2021 due to the then-emerging COVID-19 pandemic.

== History ==
Speculation for a new park area – following the widely successful Peppa Pig World and Lost Kingdom investments – was fueled by various developments that took place during the latter half of 2018. Between July and September 2018, Paulton's Park filed multiple trademarks with the IPO for the following names; ROUTE 83, STORM CHASER, and AL'S AUTO ACADEMY. During the fall, the park relocated various animal enclosures to other parts of the property, clearing a sizable construction site. In November, a Twitter account representing the tourism bureau of the fictional town Tornado Springs was created and immediately connected to the park's future developments. By this point, it had become apparent that Paultons Park was working on their next major project.

Paultons Park launched an extensive social media campaign marketing the new project, creating multiple Twitter accounts and even an official website for the town of Tornado Springs, which began to distribute artwork and teaser posters throughout much of 2020. During a March 2019 interview with InterPark Magazine, park owner Richard Mancey stated that a new themed area was due to open in 2020, with 5 new attractions intended for children, as well as a "world class" roller coaster. Using artwork teased during the promotional campaign and roller coaster footers beginning to take shape on the construction site, roller coaster enthusiasts eventually determined that this would likely be a spinning coaster from German manufacturer Mack Rides. In May 2019, Danish creative firm MK Themed Attractions confirmed that they had been contracted to handle the Tornado Springs' theming elements.

Tornado Springs was formally announced and unveiled in full on 4 July 2019. It would cover 4 acres (1.6 hectares), include multiple family and thrill rides, and feature a headlining attraction in the form of Storm Chaser, the rumored Mack Rides spinning coaster. Vertical construction of Storm Chaser began in late September, and its final track piece was placed and the coaster topped off on 17 October 2019. Theming and props were installed throughout the fall and winter, and an opening timeframe was set for May 2020.

However, in April 2020, the emerging COVID-19 pandemic forced the park to postpone the opening of Tornado Springs to Easter 2021. Paultons' representatives expressed their disappointment of the delay, but assured that the new area and its rides would be opened the following year. Thus, the area stayed closed when the park was eventually safely reopened, although the site didn't remain dormant. Storm Chaser's first train arrived in March 2020, and testing of the ride first began on 16 July 2020.

On 23 September 2020 Paultons officially announced an opening date of 19 March 2021 for Storm Chaser and Tornado Springs. However, during the fall/winter of 2020–2021, the United Kingdom re-entered a national lockdown in response to a surge in COVID-19 cases. The second lockdown once again renewed uncertainty over the planned opening date. On 22 February 2021 Prime Minister Boris Johnson presented a four-step plan to ease restrictions, which would allow theme parks to reopen no later than 12 April. As the park's reopening schedule became further solid, the opening date was shifted to 12 April 2021, where it remained. The first on-ride point-of-view of Storm Chaser was released on 8 April 2021. As intended, Storm Chaser opened alongside Tornado Springs on 12 April 2021.

== Characteristics ==
=== Ride experience ===
Upon dispatch, the trains make a right-hand turn out of the station and ascend the 65.6 feet (20.0 m) lift hill. Once at the top, the cars are disengaged from their loading position and begin to spin freely, while the train descends a small drop and navigates a large elevated helix above Tornado Springs pathways. Dipping up and crossing over the Rio Grande Railway, riders plunge into another drop and navigate several mostly-low to the ground turns and helixes, interacting with thematic elements along the way. Shortly after the final turn, riders hit the Brake run, where the train cars are righted and returned to the station. One full ride from station to brakes lasts approximately one minute.

=== Theme ===
Storm Chaser is situated in Tornado Springs, a fictional midwestern American desert town set in the 1950s. The theming elements were designed and provided by MK Themed Attractions and Leisure Expert Group.

=== Statistics ===
Storm Chaser is an exact clone of the Sierra Sidewinder coaster at Knott's Berry Farm in Buena Park, California. The coaster reaches a top height of 65.6 feet (20.0 m), and assuming that the statistics are shared with its original, is also 1,410.8 feet (430.0 m) long with a top speed of 37 mph (60 km/h). Storm Chaser is able to run two 4-car trains, which each seat four riders in two rows of two, for a total occupancy of 16 riders. Each of the cars are able to spin freely throughout the layout. These trains are stored via a stacked storage system instead of the typical transfer track and shed found on most rides capable of running multiple trains. Instead of a switch track into a shed, one train can be stored below the station while the other is stored within the station, and can be lifted up via an elevator lift underneath the platform. This system is fairly rare, and can be found on some of Mack Ride's products (e.g. Sierra Sidewinder) and The Big One at Blackpool Pleasure Beach.
