= Raven (Paultons Park) =

- Previously known as Cobra (2006–2025)

Paultons Park
- Location: Paultons Park
- Park section: Valgard: Realm of the Vikings
- Coordinates: 50.947327°N 1.557086°W
- Status: Operating
- Opening date: March 18, 2006 (as Cobra); May 16, 2026 (as Raven)
- Closing date: September 7, 2025 (as Cobra)

General statistics
- Type: Steel
- Manufacturer: Gerstlauer
- Model: Bobsled Coaster
- Height: 54.2 ft (16.5 m)
- Speed: 31.1 mph (50.1 km/h)
- Inversions: 0
- Raven at RCDB

Raven (formerly Cobra) is a steel roller coaster located at Paultons Park in the United Kingdom. Manufactured by Gerstlauer, the ride is a Bobsled Coaster (Model 450/4) that opened to the public on 18 March 2006. Designed as a family-thrill attraction, the coaster features a series of helices, tight turns, drops, and airtime hills along its 450-metre (1,476 ft) layout, reaching a height of approximately 17 metres (54 ft) and a top speed of about 46 km/h (29 mph).

== Restrictions ==
Riders must be at least 1.1 metres (3 ft 7 in) tall and 4 years of age to ride. Children under 8 years old and below 1.3 metres (4 ft 3 in) must be accompanied by a responsible adult.

The ride features single cars. Riders are arranged 2 across in 2 rows, for a total of 4 riders per car.

== History ==
The roller coaster opened to the public on 18 March 2006 and operated until 7 September 2025, when it closed temporarily to allow for the construction of Valgard: Realm of the Vikings, a new themed area. The attraction reopened on 16 May 2026 under the new name Raven, featuring updated theming and a revised colour scheme while retaining its original ride layout.
