= Sierra Sidewinder =

Roller coaster at Knott's Berry Farm

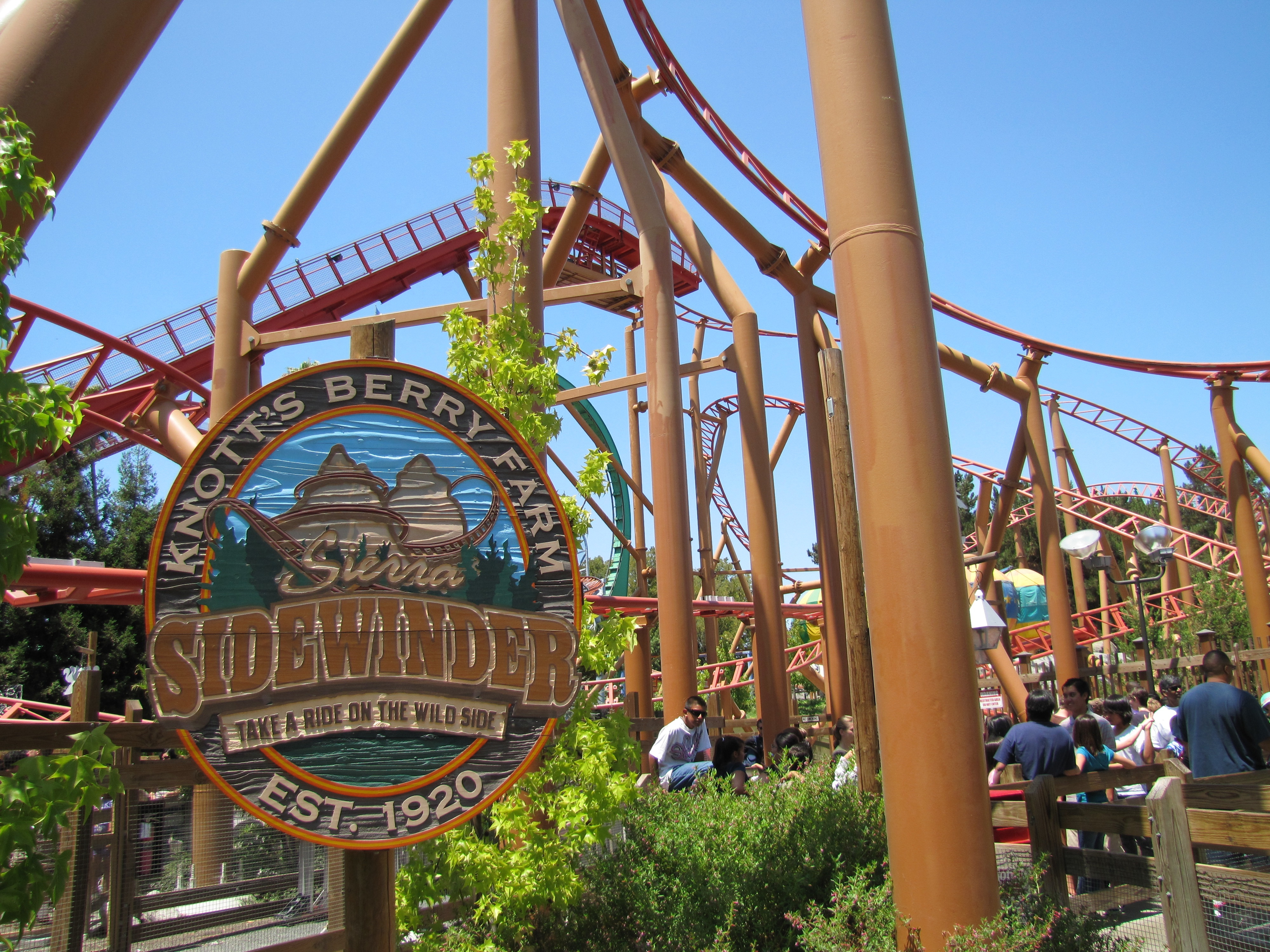
- Sierra Sidewinder in 2010

Knott's Berry Farm
- Location: Knott's Berry Farm
- Park section: Camp Snoopy
- Coordinates: 33°50′42″N 117°59′55″W
- Status: Operating
- Opening date: May 26, 2007; 19 years ago

General statistics
- Type: Steel – Spinning
- Manufacturer: Mack Rides
- Designer: Werner Stengel
- Model: Spinning Coaster / Sierra Sidewinder
- Lift/launch system: Chain lift hill
- Height: 62.3 ft (19.0 m)
- Drop: 39 ft (12 m)
- Length: 1,410 ft (430 m)
- Speed: 37 mph (60 km/h)
- Inversions: 0
- Duration: 1:10
- Capacity: 1000 riders per hour
- Height restriction: 42 in (107 cm)
- Trains: 2 trains with 4 cars; riders arranged 2 across in 2 rows for a total of 16 riders per train
- Fast Lane available
- Sierra Sidewinder at RCDB

Sierra Sidewinder is a steel spinning roller coaster located in the Camp Snoopy section of Knott's Berry Farm. It was the first spinning roller coaster in the United States to feature trains with multiple spinning cars, rather than an individual spinning car, like those found on a Reverchon or Zamperla Twister Coaster. The ride was also one of the first roller coasters to feature on-ride video recordings, as opposed to the traditional still on-ride photograph.

== History ==
At the ACE Halloween Haunt event for the Southern California Region of American Coaster Enthusiasts in 2006, Jack Falfas, COO of Cedar Fair, hinted at something different in the coming year. Construction began shortly after the announcement with the removal of the Paddlewheel Boat Ride and relocation of Woodstock's Air Mail.

On November 29, 2006, Knott's Berry Farm announced that they would be adding Sierra Sidewinder. It would be located right next to the entrance of Camp Snoopy. The ride would be the park's eighth roller coaster.

Sierra Sidewinder officially opened on May 26, 2007.

== Characteristics ==
=== Trains ===
Sierra Sidewinder features two trains with four cars with two rows each, seating two per row back-to-back. It has a theoretical capacity of 1,000 riders per hour. Each car is locked in position in the station for stability during loading and unloading. Once the train leaves the station the cars spin freely on their own axis. After the train returns to the station, the cars are rotated back to the home position and the rotation is locked. The coaster is the first free-spinning model from Mack Rides of Waldkirch, Germany. Mack had previously built the spinning coaster, Euro-Mir, at its home park in Rust, Germany, but the car's rotation on that ride is controlled by a motor. The rotation is also locked during certain portions of the ride.

The Sierra Sidewinder ride structure and transfer track are unusual because the train storage is beneath the ride as opposed to being next to the ride. The on-ride video recording that was present on the trains when the ride opened was removed as of the 2011 season. Small holes on the fronts and rears of each car indicate where the video cameras were mounted.

=== Track ===
The steel track is approximately 1,505.9 feet (459.0 m) long, with a lift hill approximately 62.3 feet (19.0 m) tall. The track is painted red with tan supports.
