= Impulse (roller coaster) =

Roller coaster at Knoebels Amusement Resort

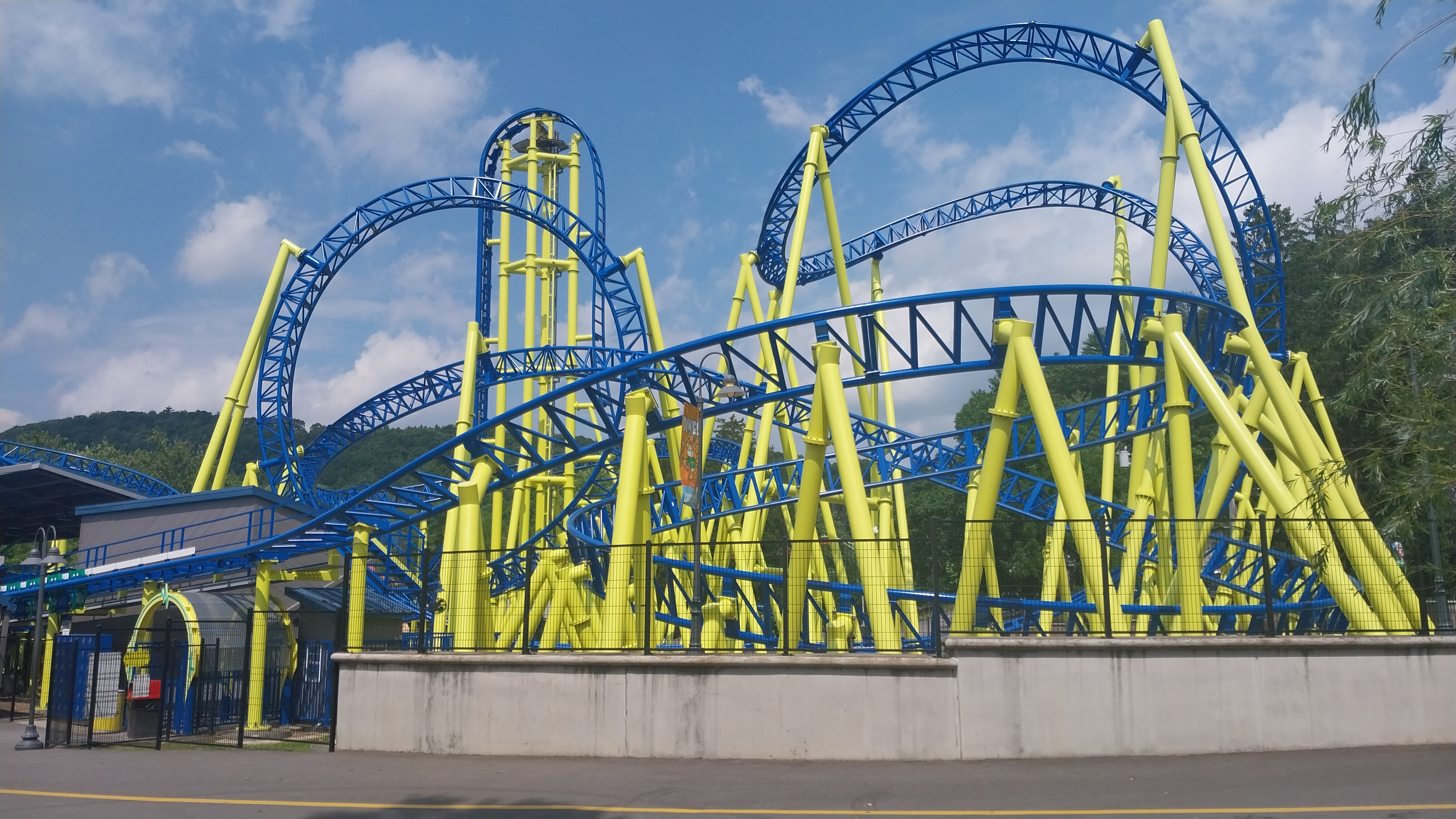
- Impulse at Knoebels in July 2024

Knoebels Amusement Resort
- Location: Knoebels Amusement Resort
- Coordinates: 40.879784°N 76.501762°W
- Status: Operating
- Opening date: April 25, 2015

General statistics
- Type: Steel
- Manufacturer: Zierer
- Model: Tower Speed Coaster
- Lift/launch system: Vertical chain lift hill
- Height: 98 ft (30 m)
- Length: 1,975 ft (602 m)
- Speed: 55 mph (89 km/h)
- Inversions: 4
- Duration: 1:20
- Max vertical angle: 90°
- Height restriction: 48 in (122 cm)
- Trains: 3 separate cars with 8 riders each, seated in 2 rows of 4 across
- Impulse at RCDB

Video

Impulse is a steel roller coaster located at Knoebels Amusement Resort in Elysburg, Pennsylvania. It was manufactured by Zierer and was the first major steel coaster to open at Knoebels since Whirlwind closed in 2004. Impulse was the park's most expensive addition when it was completed in 2015.

== History ==
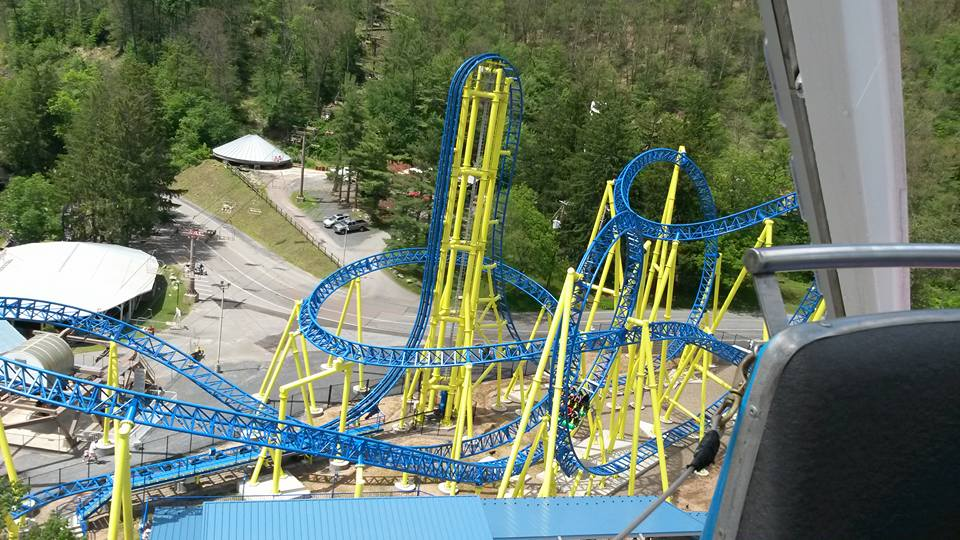
Impulse as seen from Giant Wheel

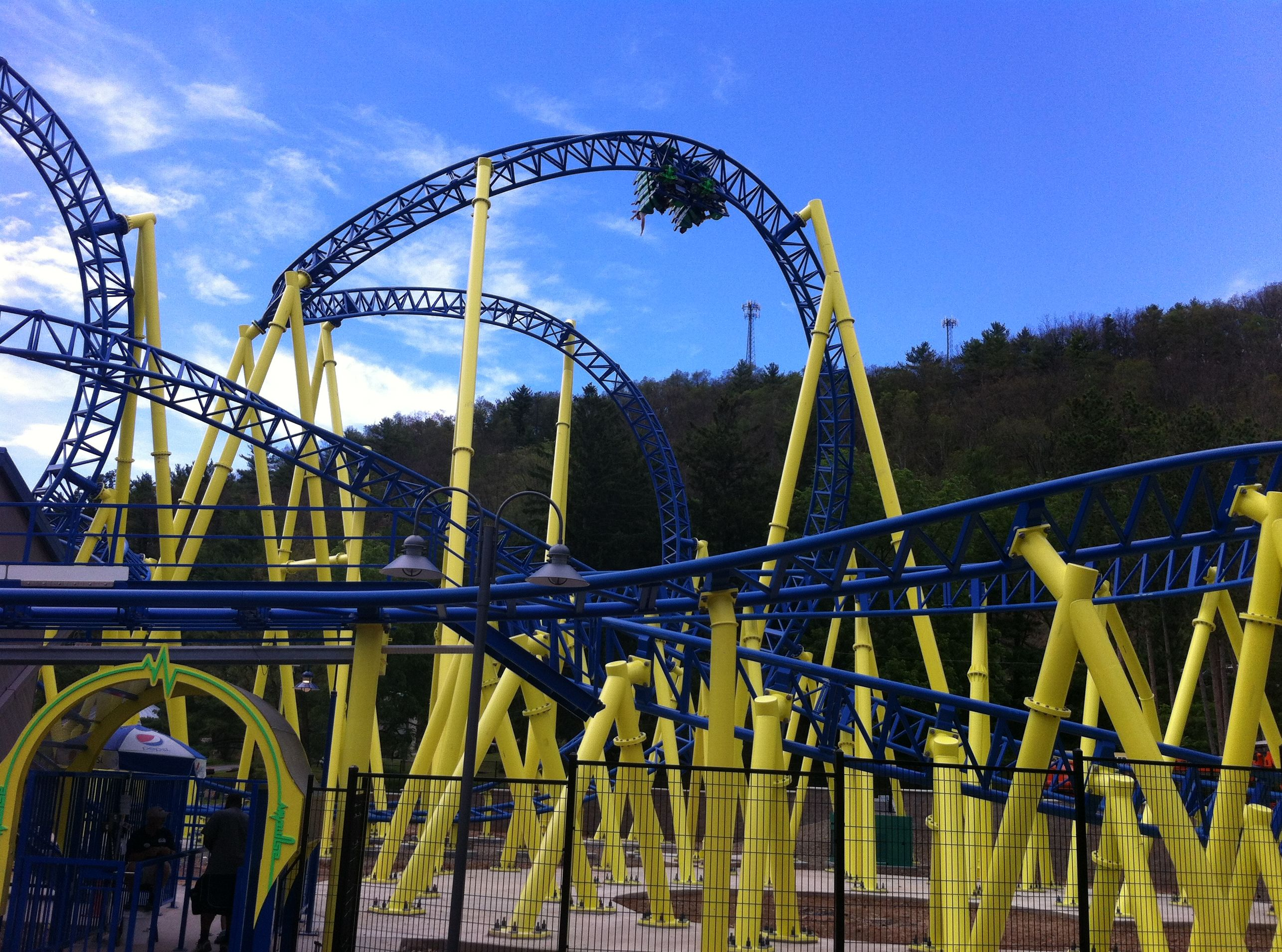
Impulse

The park had been looking for a new roller coaster after Whirlwind was closed and shipped to Parque de Diversiones in Costa Rica in 2004. The park hired German manufacturer Zierer to design the new ride. The actual design process did not start until 2009. Construction began in July 2013, and the coaster was assembled at the park in late February 2015. The project was complete by April 2015.

Impulse replaced the Bumper Boats ride, which was purchased from Rocky Glen Park in Moosic, Pennsylvania in the 1980s.

== Ride experience ==
Riders are restrained by a lap bar which goes across the legs and the waist. The ride features three cars, each of which seats eight riders.

The ride begins with the car making a right turn out of the station, before climbing up a vertical 98 ft (30m) lift hill. Upon cresting the lift, the car immediately plummets down a 90 degree vertical drop (during which the on-ride photo is taken) into a cobra roll. After completing the cobra roll, the car passes through a short section of straight track before completing a vertical loop. The vertical loop is followed by an elevated right turn passing over the entrance to the nearby Scenic Skyway, after which the car dives down into an upward counterclockwise helix which wraps around the lift hill. Upon completing the helix, the car passes through a heartline roll that threads through the vertical loop. This is followed by a clockwise 540 degree helix, after which the car hits the brake run and returns to the station. One cycle of the ride lasts one minute and 20 seconds.

== Elements ==
- Vertical lift hill
- Cobra roll
- Loop
- Inline twist
- 540° helix
