= Twister (Knoebels Amusement Resort) =

Roller coaster at Knoebels Amusement Resort

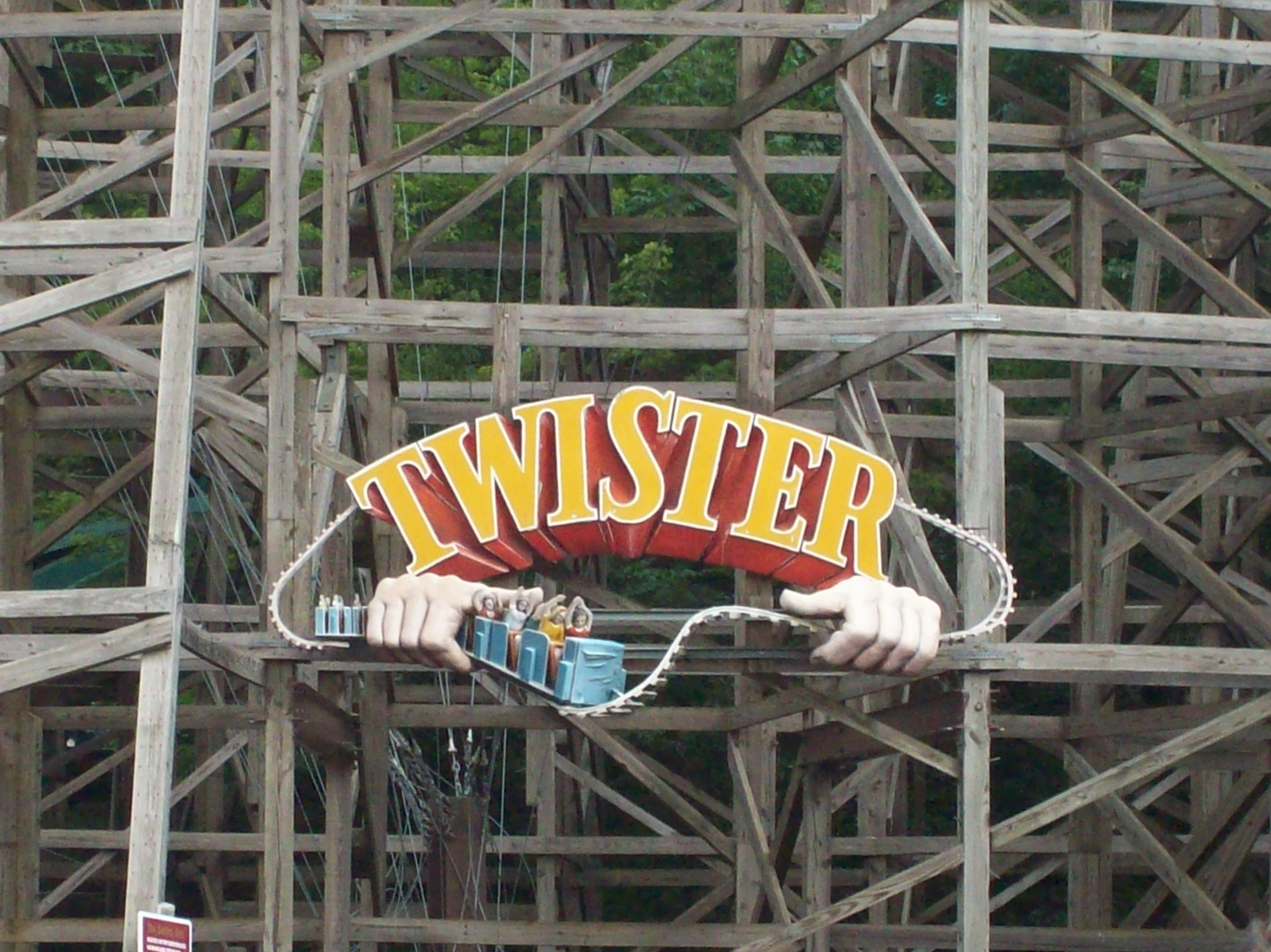

Knoebels Amusement Resort
- Location: Knoebels Amusement Resort
- Coordinates: 40.877058°N 76.504094°W
- Status: Operating
- Opening date: July 24, 1999
- Cost: $3 million

General statistics
- Type: Wood
- Manufacturer: Knoebels Amusement Resort
- Designer: John Fetterman, 1999; From John Allen's 1964; Mister Twister design
- Track layout: Twister
- Lift/launch system: Two chain lift hills
- Height: 101.5 ft (30.9 m)
- Drop: 89.6 ft (27.3 m)
- Length: 3,900 ft (1,200 m)
- Speed: 51 mph (82 km/h)
- Inversions: 0
- Duration: 2:10
- Height restriction: 42 in (107 cm)
- Trains: 2 trains with 6 cars; riders arranged 2 across in 2 rows for a total of 24 riders per train
- Twister at RCDB

Video

Twister is a wooden roller coaster located at Knoebels Amusement Resort in Elysburg, Pennsylvania. It was designed by John Fetterman, with heavy inspiration taken from Mister Twister at Elitch Gardens.

== History ==
Knoebels began planning a roller coaster in 1998, following the popularity of its recent addition, Phoenix, a relocated coaster from Playland Park in San Antonio, Texas. Seeking to preserve another classic ride, the park looked into acquiring the defunct "Mister Twister", which had been abandoned when the entire Elitch Gardens amusement park was relocated to Denver, Colorado. However, Mister Twister had been closed for so long that it was no longer in operating condition, and space constraints made physically relocating the ride impossible. Knoebels purchased the blueprints and set out to rebuild the roller coaster from scratch, modifying the design to fit the space available. A groundbreaking ceremony for the new Twister took place on November 3, 1998. At the time, the roller coaster was expected to cost $2 million to $3 million. Knoebels president Dick Knoebel described the ride as the largest project in the park's history.

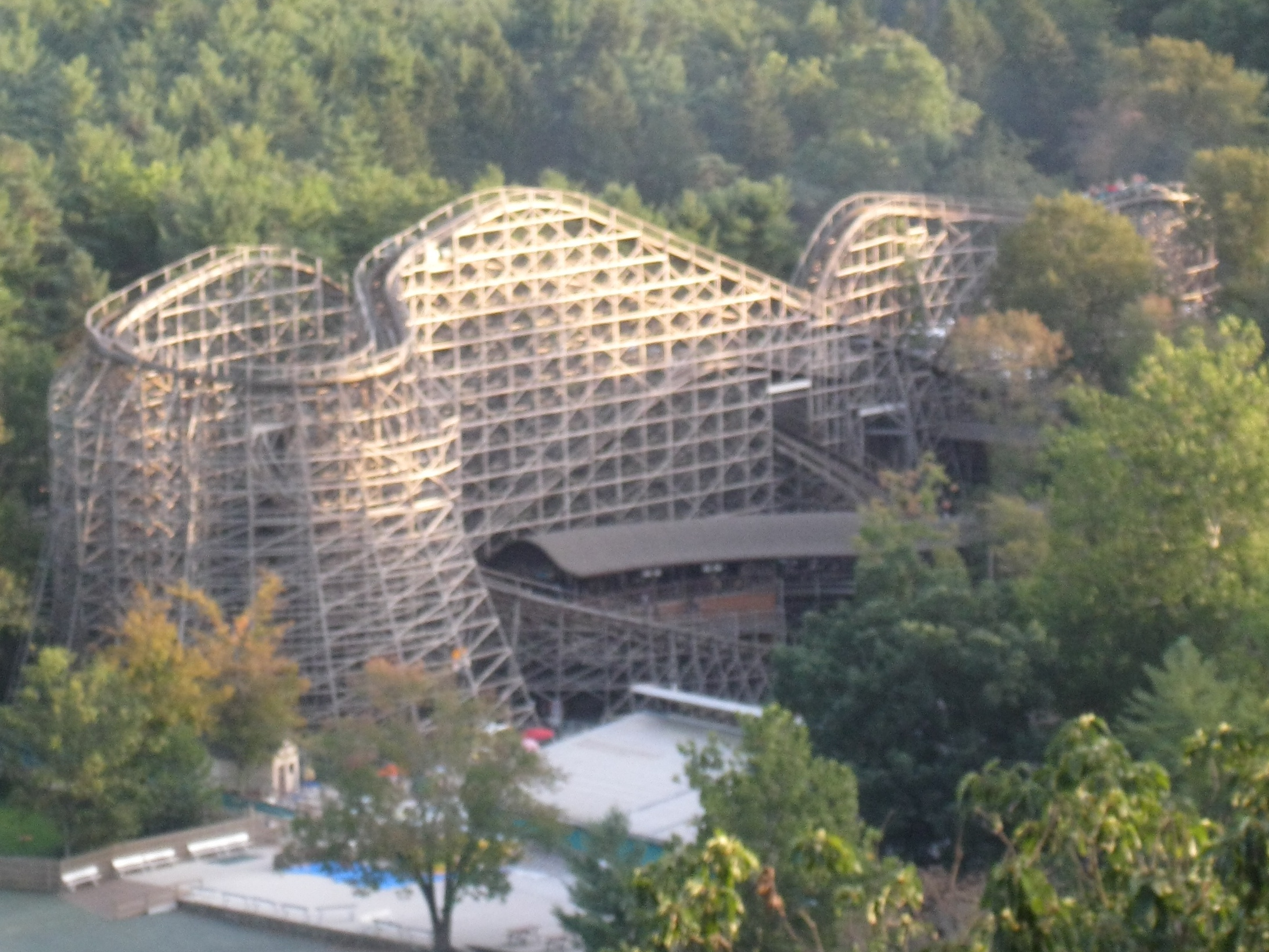
Twister

The ride was designed by Knoebels staff designer John Fetterman, based on John Allen's original design for Mister Twister. Fetterman had never ridden Mister Twister himself, but one of his friends had recommended the ride after having gone on Mister Twister. Twister ultimately cost $3 million to build. The Adams Construction Company built the ride over a period of eight months. The roller coaster opened on July 24, 1999. An auction for seats on Twister's inaugural ride raised $8,625 for the Make-A-Wish Foundation.

== Characteristics ==
Twister is 3,900 feet (1,200 m) long. It measures 101 feet 7 inches (30.96 m) tall, with a first drop measuring 89 feet 7 inches (27.31 m). One cycle lasts about 2 minutes and 10 seconds. Throughout the course, the track crosses itself 36 times. The ride originally used 12-car trains with two seats per car.

For the new Twister, Fetterman created a modified mirror image of the original Mister Twister layout, compacting the ride but preserving the highlights of the old design and Allen's original mathematical model. These highlights include a large double helix, which now wraps around the ride's curved station, and a large swoop curve at the top of the lift hill. To keep the swoop curve in the new design, Fetterman created a split lift hill. To achieve this, the train climbs halfway up the structure on one lift hill, makes a 180-degree turn and finishes the climb on a second lift hill, stacked directly above the first one. While several roller coasters use more than one lift hill in their layout, Twister's zig-zag lift hill is unique.

== Ride experience ==
Once dispatched, the train drops out of the curved station, descends a slight lefthand turn through the structure, then makes a sweeping righthand turn and enters the lower section of the lift hill, which is stacked underneath the second lift hill. After climbing halfway up, the track leaves the first lift hill, and makes a left turn out of the structure, then slams into a 180 degree turn passing under the exit from the double helix and climbs the upper section of the lift hill. At the top of the lift hill, the track passes through the swoop curve before diving down an 89.6-foot first drop, then rising up a second hill for the first turnaround. The train dives off the turnaround in its second drop, and rises into the double helix, which goes twice around the station. After the helix, trains pass over a trimmed airtime hill and make a right turn inside the structure of the second hill. The train descends another drop, traveling within the structure, and traverses a banked right turn into an underground tunnel, the entrance into which being where the on-ride photo is taken. Exiting the tunnel, the track makes another unbanked right turn, falls down a small drop, before rising up and hitting the curved final brake run, where it reenters the station. Due to space limitations caused by the station's location in the middle of the helix, the station's track is curved, and both it and the brake run use skid brakes instead of pinch or magnetic brakes.

== Awards ==
Golden Ticket Awards: Top wood Roller Coasters
Year									1998	1999
Ranking									–	–
Year	2000	2001	2002	2003	2004	2005	2006	2007	2008	2009
Ranking	15	20	22	21	25	25	29	30	32	31
Year	2010	2011	2012	2013	2014	2015	2016	2017	2018	2019
Ranking	32	20	33	39	40	41	47	35	50	45 (tie)
Year	2020	2021	2022	2023	2024	2025	2026			
Ranking	N/A	32	31 (tie)	27 (tie)	28	25	17			

== Image gallery ==
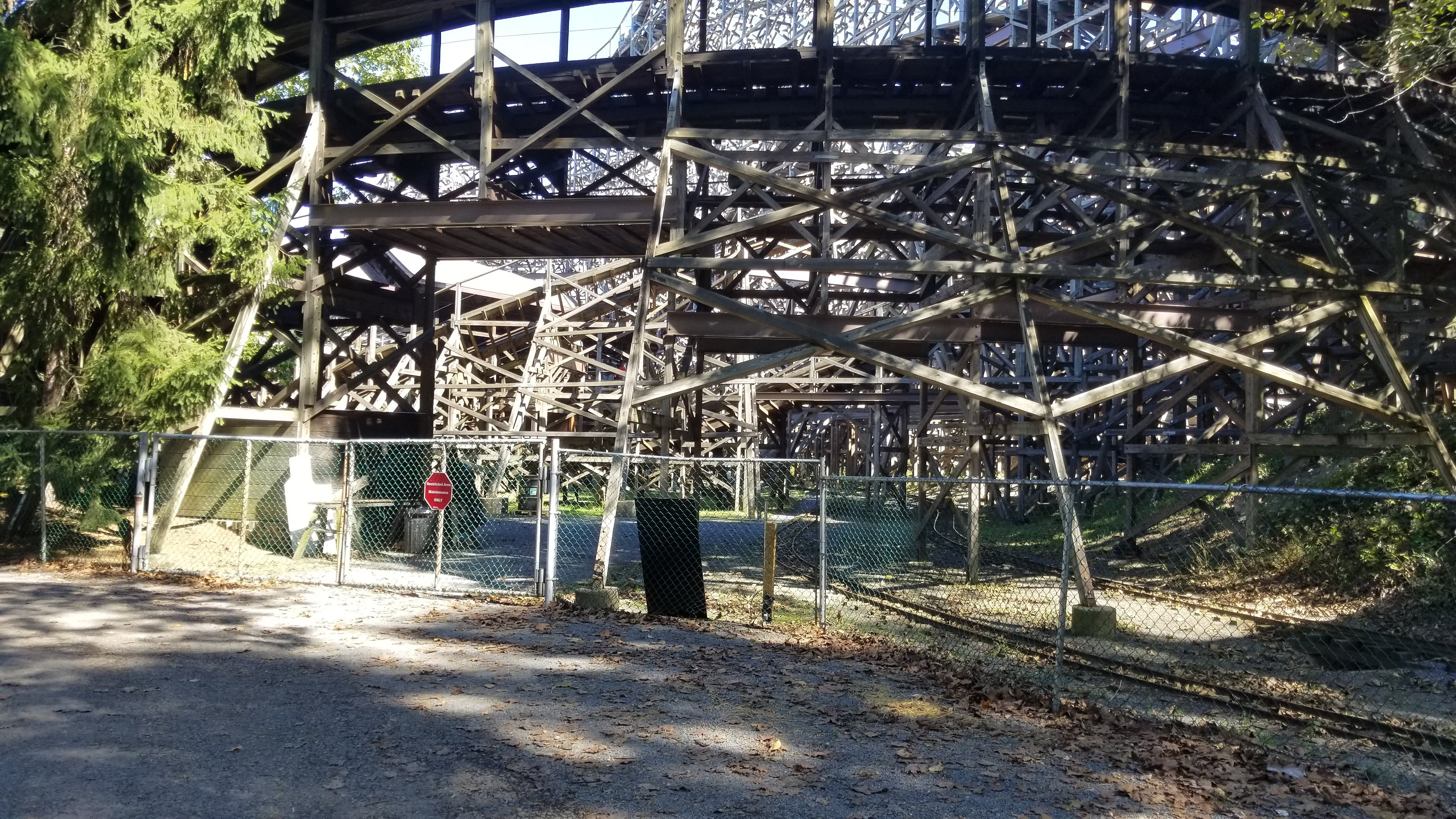
The Pioneer miniature train passes under Twister's structure twice

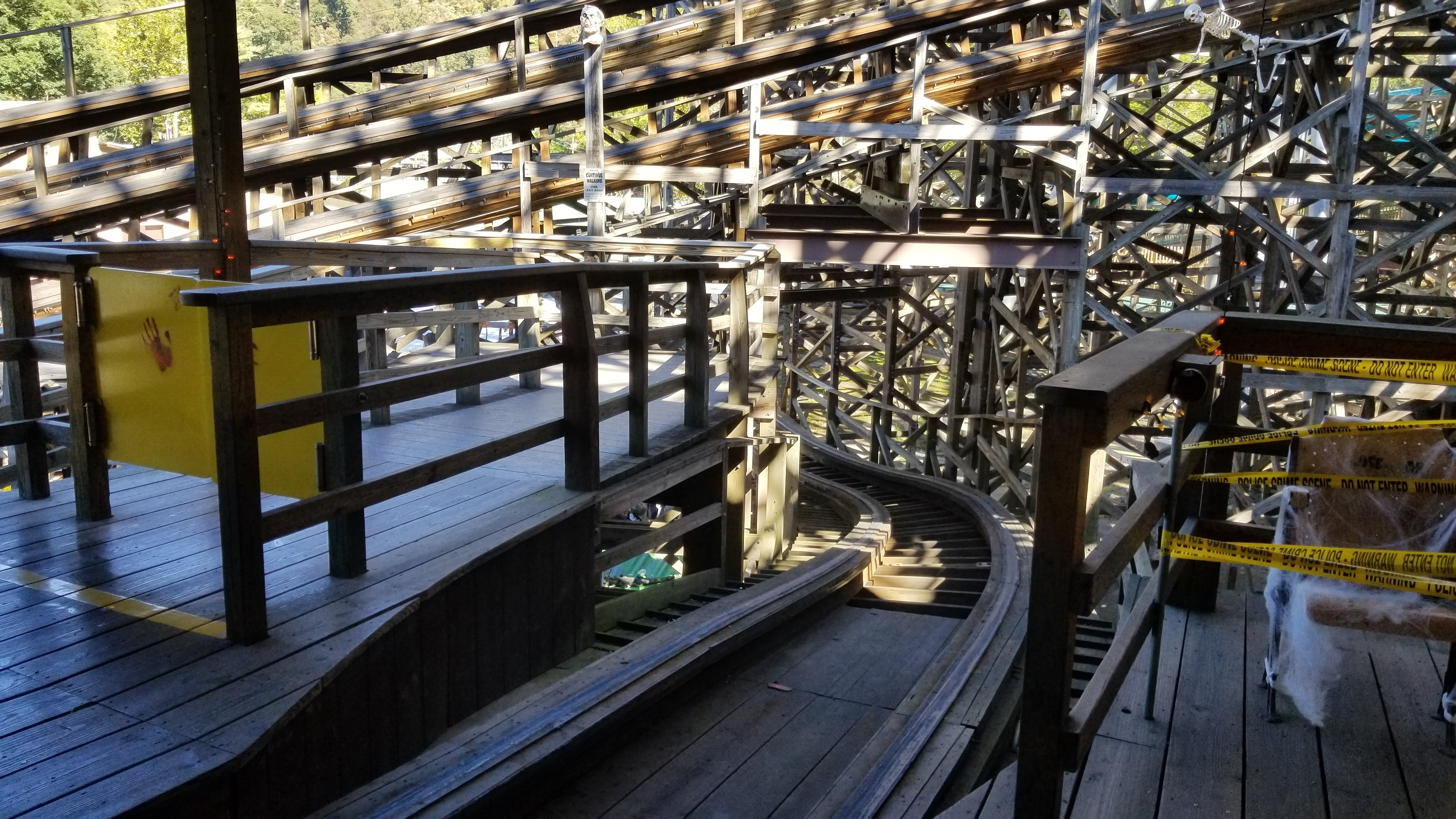
Track heading out of the station

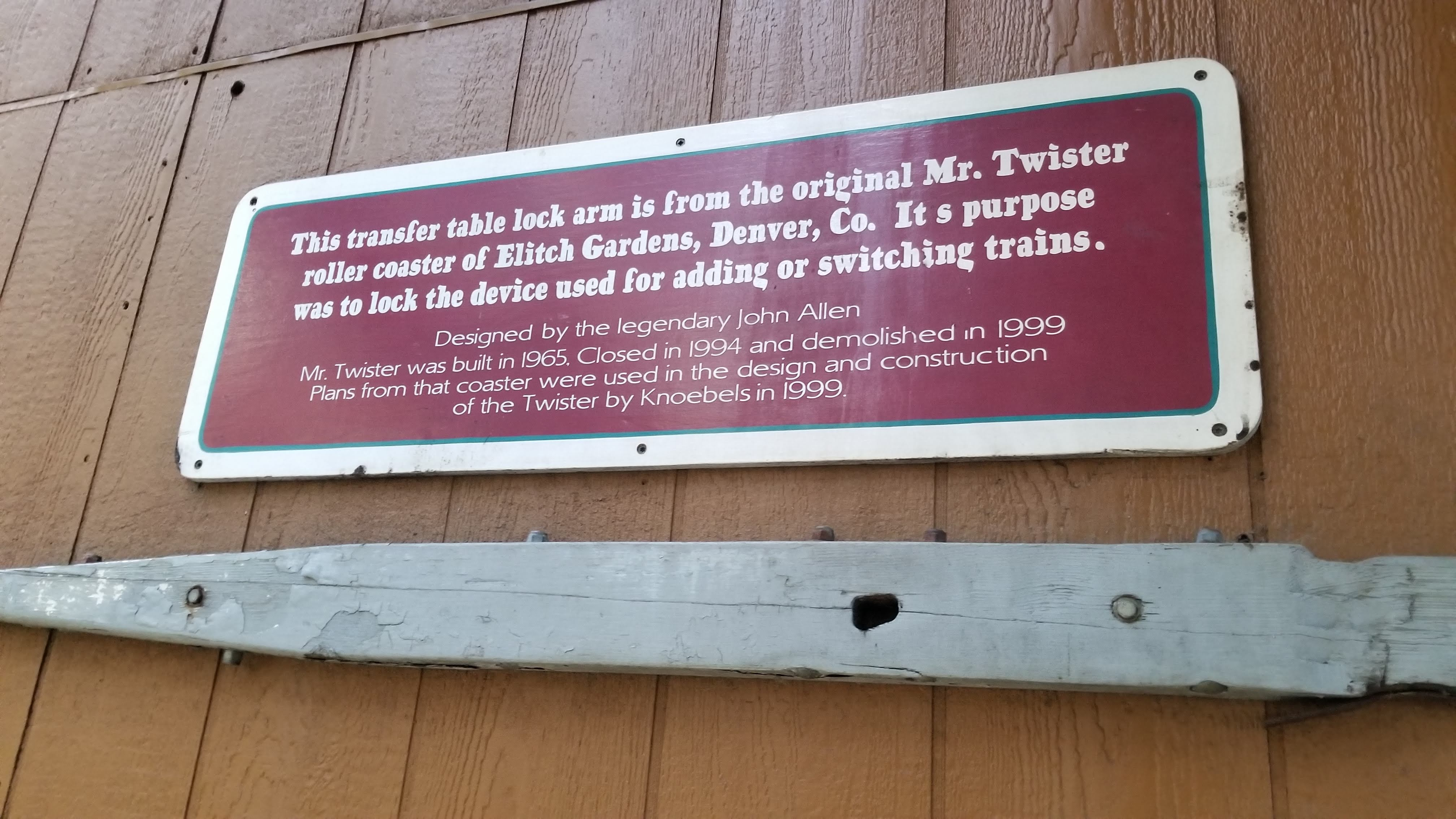
A transfer table lock arm from the original Mister Twister is on display in the queue line

A plaque commemorating the "golden bolt", a bolt salvaged from the original Mister Twister and installed into the structure of the swoop curve

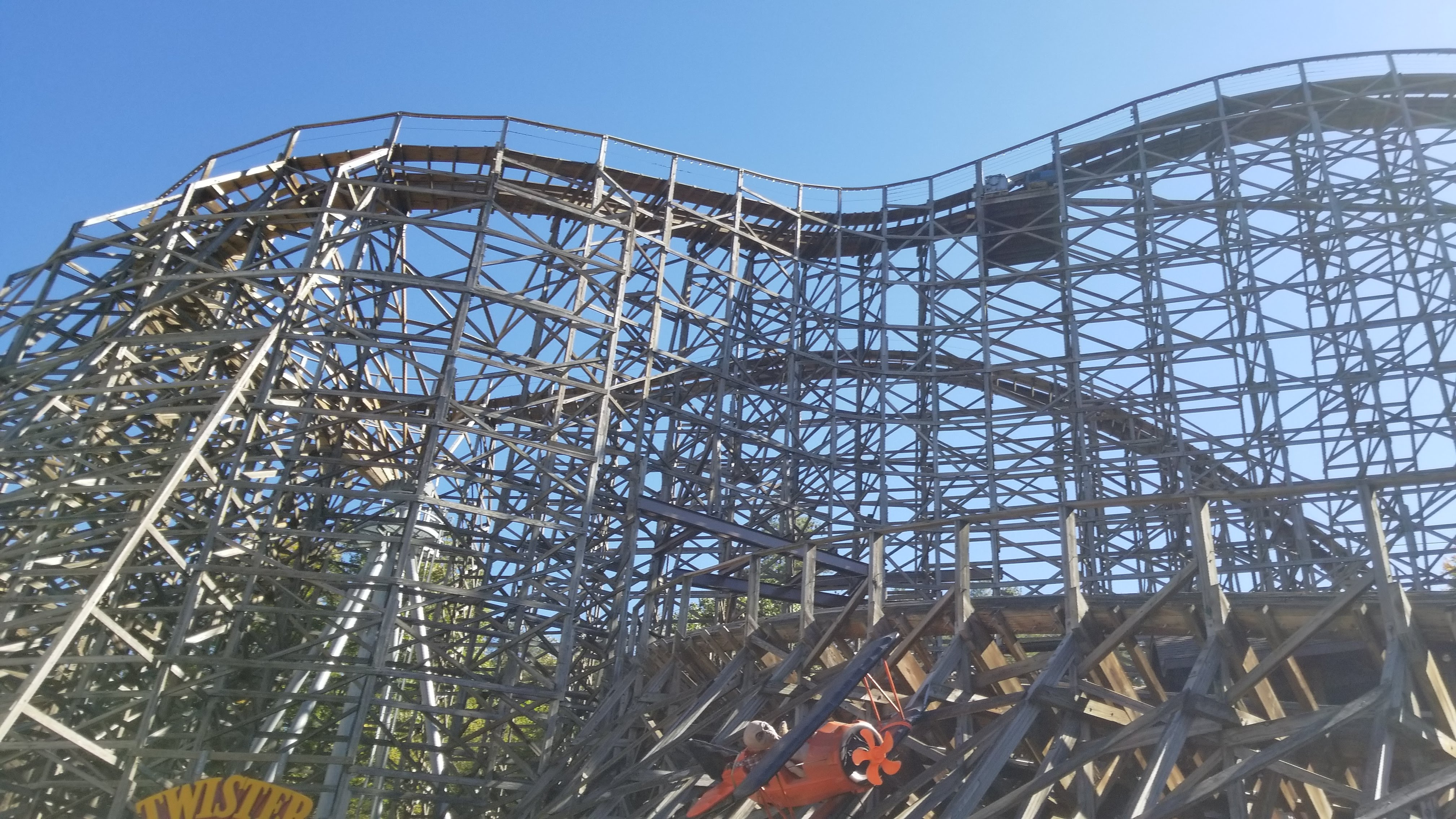
The swoop curve and first drop as viewed from ground level
