= Preston Zachman =

American football player

No. 6 – Indiana Hoosiers
- Position: Safety
- Class: Graduate student

Personal information
- Listed height: 6 ft 2 in (1.88 m)
- Listed weight: 209 lb (95 kg)

Career information
- High school: Southern Columbia Area (Catawissa, Pennsylvania)
- College: Wisconsin (2020–2025); Indiana (2026–present)
- Stats at ESPN

Preston Zachman is an American college football safety for the Indiana Hoosiers. He previously played for the Wisconsin Badgers.

== Early life ==
Zachman grew up in Elysburg, Pennsylvania and attended Southern Columbia Area High School in Catawissa, Pennsylvania, where he lettered in football, baseball and wrestling. Coming out of high school, he was rated as a three-star recruit and committed to play college football for the Wisconsin Badgers.

== College career ==
=== Wisconsin ===
As a freshman in 2020, Zachman played in one game versus Michigan. In 2021, he took a redshirt after missing the entire season with a sports hernia. In 2022, Zachman tallied 11 tackles with one being for a loss, a pass deflection, and an interception in six games. In 2023, he made 49 tackles with one being for a loss, three pass deflections, and two interceptions in 13 games. In week 5 of the 2024 season, Zachman brought in an interception in a loss to USC. In week 7, he recorded ten tackles with one and a half being for a loss, and an interception, in a victory over Rutgers. During the 2024 season, Zachman recorded 58 tackles with two and a half being for a loss, four pass deflections, and two interceptions in 12 starts.

=== Indiana ===
On January 4, 2026, Zachman announced he would be transferring to the Indiana Hoosiers.
