= Jet Star (Luna Park) =

Roller coaster at Luna Park

Luna Park
- Coordinates: 45.726083°N 1.173756°W
- Status: Operating
- Opening date: 2000

Morey's Piers
- Park section: Surfside Pier
- Coordinates: 38.989°N 74.802°W
- Status: Removed
- Opening date: 1993
- Closing date: 1999
- Replaced by: RC-48
- Jet Star at Morey's Piers at RCDB

Knoebels Amusement Resort
- Coordinates: 40.879°N 76.505°W
- Status: Removed
- Opening date: 1977
- Closing date: 1992
- Replaced by: Whirlwind
- Jet Star at Knoebels Amusement Resort at RCDB

Coney Island
- Coordinates: 40.574°N 73.978°W
- Status: Removed
- Opening date: 1976
- Closing date: 1977

Portable
- Park section: Germany
- Coordinates: 51°N 9°E
- Status: Removed
- Opening date: 1972
- Closing date: 1976

General statistics
- Type: Steel – Family
- Manufacturer: Anton Schwarzkopf
- Designer: Ing.-Büro Stengel GmbH
- Model: Jet Star
- Height: 44.25 ft (13.49 m)
- Length: 1,765.1 ft (538.0 m)
- Speed: 31.1 mph (50.1 km/h)
- Inversions: 0
- Duration: 1:07
- Capacity: 240 riders per hour
- Height restriction: 54 in (137 cm)
- Jet Star at RCDB

Jet Star is a steel roller coaster located at Luna Park in La Palmyre, France. It was formerly located at Knoebels Amusement Resort in Elysburg, Pennsylvania, and at Morey's Piers in Wildwood, New Jersey. The ride is a standard production model Schwarzkopf Jet Star, which is a compact ride featuring many small dips and turns.

Jet Star was originally built in 1972 in Germany before being imported to the United States in 1976 into the hands of an independent operator near Astroland of Coney Island. Following the operator's financial troubles, the roller coaster was repossessed and sold to Knoebels where it opened in 1977. Jet Star operated at Knoebels until 1992, when it was sold and relocated to Morey's Piers. Jet Star was eventually sold in 1999 to Luna Park La Palmyre, where it now operates. In its place, Whirlwind was added to Knoebels' attraction lineup.

== Incidents ==
In 1997, a young boy fell out of a train when the emergency brakes were engaged to stop the ride. The child landed 29 feet (8.8 m) below and survived with jaw fractures and various dental injuries. The ride did not include seat belts or any other restraints, and the cause of the accident is believed to be a result of engaging the emergency braking system as one train approached too closely to another.
