= High Speed Thrill Coaster =

Roller coaster at Knoebels Amusement Resort

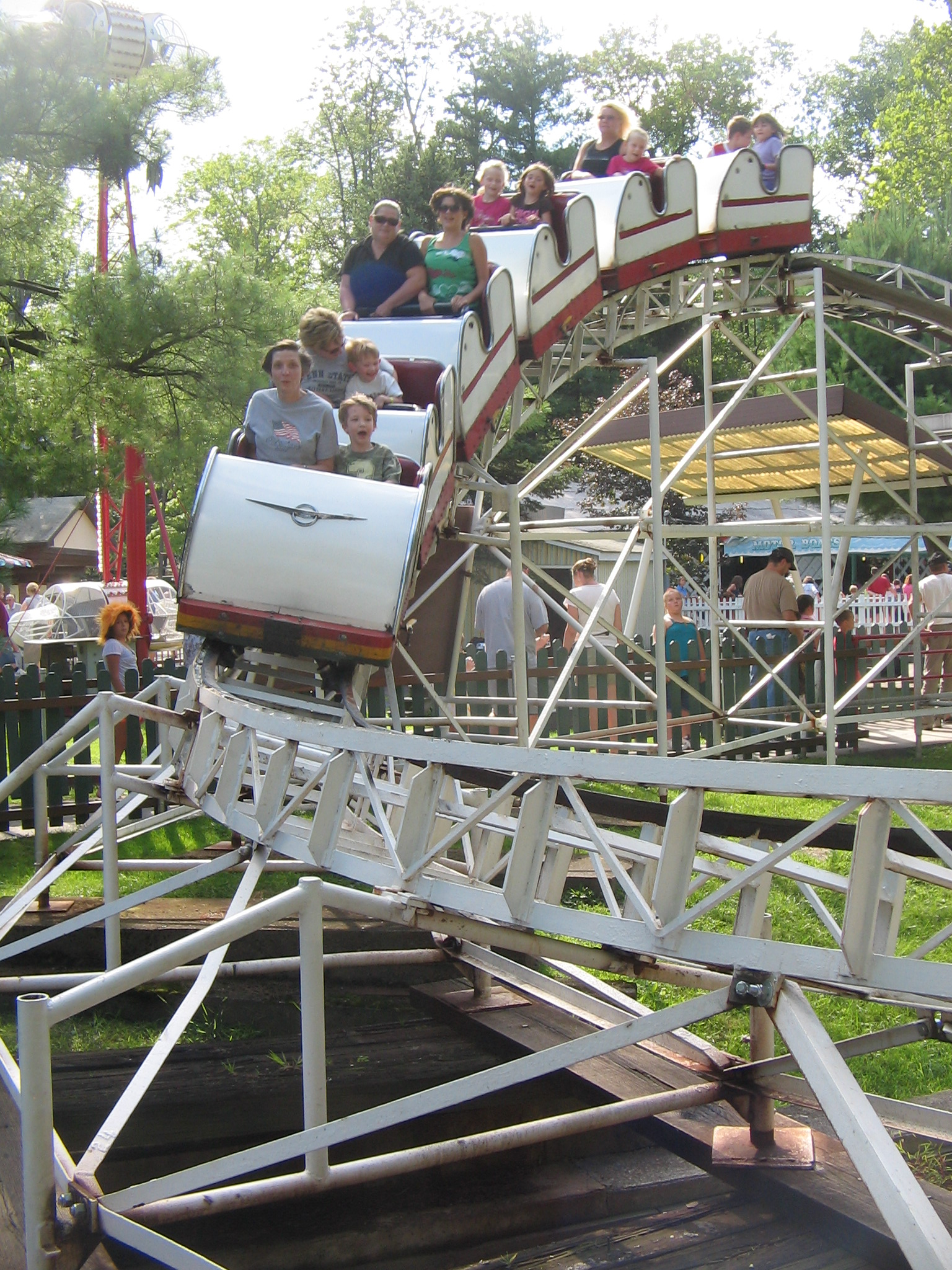
- Cars descending the first drop in 2008

Knoebels Amusement Resort
- Location: Knoebels Amusement Resort
- Coordinates: 40.880140°N 76.502711°W
- Status: Removed
- Opening date: 1955
- Closing date: 2008
- Replaced by: Kozmo's Kurves

General statistics
- Type: Steel
- Designer: Overland Amusement Company
- Track layout: Oval
- Lift/launch system: Chain lift hill
- Height: 18 ft (5.5 m)
- Drop: 12 ft (3.7 m)
- Length: 200 ft (61 m)
- Inversions: 0
- Height restriction: 42 in (107 cm)
- High Speed Thrill Coaster at RCDB

High Speed Thrill Coaster was a steel children's roller coaster located at Knoebels Amusement Resort in Elysburg, Pennsylvania.

== History ==
Built by Overland Amusement Company, it opened in 1955 and operated until 2008. The installation at Knoebels was the last remaining roller coaster from the company in operation.

The layout consisted of a small 18-foot-high (5.5 m) lift hill, followed by a diving 180° turn and several small hills, ending with another 180° turn back to the station. High Speed Thrill Coaster's lift hill was powered by a six-cylinder Ford engine. The operator could control the coaster's overall speed by adjusting the speed of the chain through a clutch lever to engage and disengage the engine from the lift chain.

The ride was dismantled beginning in late 2008. According to the park's website, the ride was "worn out". It was the first roller coaster to be built at Knoebels, and as such was the longest continually-operating roller coaster at the park.

The area where the coaster was located is still used for a junior roller coaster known as Kozmo's Kurves, the successor to High Speed Thrill Coaster. Kozmo's Kurves opened on August 1, 2009.
