= Henry Hynoski =

American football player (born 1988)

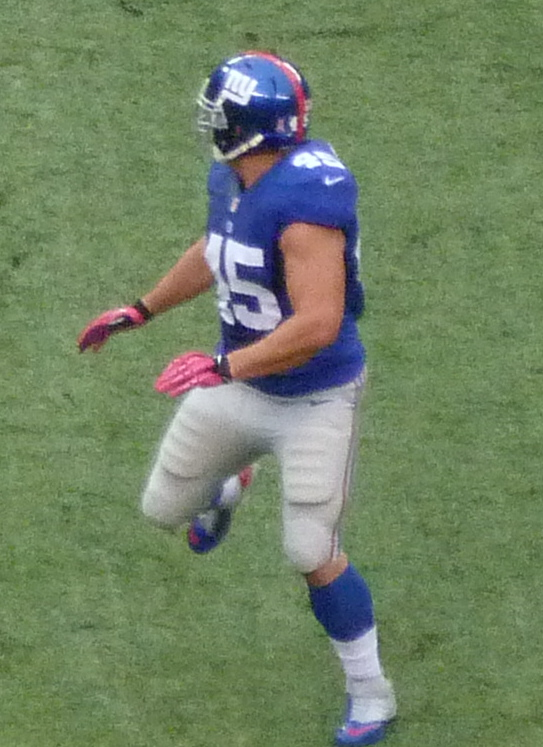
- Hynoski in 2012

No. 45
- Position: Fullback

Personal information
- Born: December 30, 1988 (age 37); Elysburg, Pennsylvania, U.S.
- Listed height: 6 ft 2 in (1.88 m)
- Listed weight: 260 lb (118 kg)

Career information
- High school: Southern Columbia Area (Catawissa, Pennsylvania)
- College: Pittsburgh
- NFL draft: 2011: undrafted

Career history
- New York Giants (2011–2014)

Awards and highlights
- Super Bowl champion (XLVI)

Career NFL statistics
- Rushing yards: 33
- Rushing average: 2.8
- Receptions: 24
- Receiving yards: 138
- Receiving touchdowns: 1
- Stats at Pro Football Reference

Henry Philip Hynoski Jr. (born December 30, 1988) is an American former professional football player who was a fullback for the New York Giants of the National Football League (NFL) from 2011 to 2014. He won Super Bowl XLVI with the team over the New England Patriots. Hynoski played college football for the Pittsburgh Panthers.

== Early life and family ==
Hynoski, nicknamed "Hank the Tank", "Hynoceros", "Polish Hammer", "Polish Plow", was born in Elysburg, Pennsylvania to Henry Sr. and Kathy Hynoski. He is of Polish ancestry — his father's side is from the Mazury area and his mother's parents are from Gdańsk and Suwałki. His paternal grandfather changed his name from Chojnowski to Hynoski after arriving in the US.

His father was a running back at Temple University. In 1975, Henry Sr. was selected in the sixth round by the Cleveland Browns.

Hynoski was a prolific rusher in high school at Southern Columbia Area, finishing his career with 7,165 yards and 113 touchdowns. He led Southern Columbia to four consecutive PIAA class "A" state championships (2003–06). Hynoski is currently tenth on the all-time Pennsylvania high school rushing list, and was regarded as one of the top fullback prospects in the country, being ranked seventh by Rivals and fourth by Scout, in addition to being named the Associated Press Class A player of the year. Despite these accolades he was lightly recruited and he accepted a scholarship offer from the University of Pittsburgh.

== College career ==
Hynoski redshirted in 2007, his freshman year, and was primarily a special-teams player in 2008, his redshirt freshman year, where he played in five games and recorded one carry for five yards. He eventually became the starting fullback halfway through 2009, his redshirt sophomore year. In 2010, as a junior, he remained entrenched as Pitt's starting fullback. In early 2011 he announced that he would forgo his senior season and declare for the NFL draft.

== Professional career ==
Hynoski was regarded as one of the best fullbacks available in the 2011 NFL draft, until he suffered a hamstring injury during the NFL Scouting Combine. Due to the injury, his draft stock fell and he eventually went undrafted; however, soon after the NFL labor dispute was settled he received offers from several teams, subsequently making his decision to play for the New York Giants. Hynoski was given the starting fullback position after the Giants cut veteran Madison Hedgecock due to injury.

Hynoski had no rushing statistics in his rookie season of 2011, being used primarily as a lead blocker for running backs Ahmad Bradshaw and Brandon Jacobs. Hynoski did catch 12 passes for 83 yards (a 6.9 yard per reception average). On February 5, 2012, Hynoski became a Super Bowl champion in Super Bowl XLVI, with a 21–17 win over the New England Patriots. He caught two passes for 19 yards in the game, and recovered a potentially costly Hakeem Nicks fumble in the third quarter. On December 30, 2012, his 24th birthday, he scored his first and only career touchdown against the Philadelphia Eagles. On September 5, 2015, the Giants released Hynoski.

== Coaching career ==
Hynoski was the head football coach and dean of students at Shamokin Area High School in Coal Township, Pennsylvania from 2018 to 2023. Hynoski is now the principal at Southern Columbia Area High School.
