= Jet Star =

Jet Star, JetStar or Jetstar may refer to:

== Aviation and automobiles ==
- Oldsmobile Jetstar I, an automobile produced in the 1964 and 1965 model years
- Oldsmobile Jetstar 88, an automobile produced in the 1964 through 1966 model years
- Lockheed JetStar, an executive jet
- Jetstar Airways, or its sister airlines: Jetstar Asia, Jetstar Pacific Airlines, Jetstar Japan, Jetstar Hong Kong and Valuair
- Apollo Jet Star, a Hungarian ultralight trike aircraft
- Mitsubishi Jetstar, an automobile by Mitsubishi

== Leisure ==
- Jet Star (Casino Pier), a former roller coaster located at Casino Pier from 1970 to 2000
- Jet Star (Knoebels), a former roller coaster located at Knoebels Amusement Resort
- Jet Star (Luna Park), a roller coaster located at Luna Park La Palmyre
- Jet Star (Morey's Piers), a former roller coaster located at Morey's Piers
- Jet Star (Särkänniemi), the last Jet Star type of roller coaster built
- Jet Star 2 (Lagoon), a roller coaster at Lagoon Amusement Park in Farmington, Utah
- Jumbo Jet (Cedar Point) a.k.a. Jet Star 3
- Jumbo Jet (Morey's Piers) a.k.a. Jet Star 3
- Jumbo Jet (Six Flags Great Adventure) a.k.a. Jet Star 3
- Star Jet, a former roller coaster which was located at Casino Pier from 2002 until it was destroyed by Hurricane Sandy in 2012 (and frequently misidentified as Jet Star)

== Music ==
- Jet Star (record distribution company), a United Kingdom record distribution company
- "Jet Star", a song by Blonde Redhead
- "Jet-Star", Ray Toro's alter-ego in Danger Days: The True Lives of the Fabulous Killjoys

== See also ==
- Jet (disambiguation)
- Star (disambiguation)
- The Starjets, Irish pop band
- Lockheed L-133 Starjet, proposed jet fighter
