= Southern Columbia Area High School =

Public school in Pennsylvania, United States

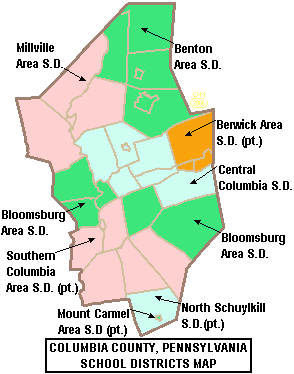

Location
- 812 Southern Drive; Catawissa, Northumberland County and Columbia County, Pennsylvania, Pennsylvania 17820; United States; 40.9044°N 76.4973°W

Information
- Type: Public
- School district: Southern Columbia Area School District
- Superintendent: James Becker
- Principal: Henry Hynoski
- Faculty: 33 teachers in 2010
- Teaching staff: 27.25 (FTE)
- Grades: 9th - 12th
- Enrollment: 378 (2022-2023)
- Student to teacher ratio: 13.87
- Language: English
- Colors: Black and gold
- Mascot: Tigers
- Feeder schools: Southern Columbia Area Middle School
- Website: https://www.scasd.us/o/hs

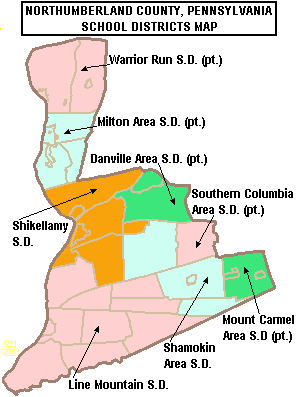
Map of Northumberland County, Pennsylvania Public School Districts

Southern Columbia Area High School is a small, rural public high school located in Catawissa, Pennsylvania. It is the sole high school operated by Southern Columbia Area School District. In 2013, Southern Columbia Area High School reported an enrollment of 437 pupils in grades 9th through 12th. The school employed 33 teachers. Southern Columbia Area High School students may choose to attend Columbia-Montour Area Vocational-Technical School for training. The Central Susquehanna Intermediate Unit IU16 provides the school with a wide variety of services like specialized education for disabled students and hearing, speech and visual disability services and professional development for staff and faculty.

== Graduation rate ==
In 2013, Southern Columbia Area High School's graduation rate was 97%. In 2012, Southern Columbia Area School District's graduation rate was 98%. In 2011, the district had a 98% graduation rate. In 2010, the Pennsylvania Department of Education issued a new, 4-year cohort graduation rate. Southern Columbia Area High School's rate was 91% for 2010.

== Dual enrollment ==
The Southern Columbia Area High School offers the Pennsylvania dual enrollment program. This state program permits high school students to take courses, at local higher education institutions, to earn college credits. The students continue to have full access to activities and programs at their high school, including the high school graduation ceremony. Classes from Bloomsburg University and Luzerne County Community College are typically available to the students.

== U.S. News & World Report award ==
In 2014, Southern Columbia Area High School was recognized by U.S. News & World Report as a bronze-level high school in a nationwide school ranking. Among Pennsylvania high schools (traditional, charter and private) 56 achieved gold or silver medals. Another 103 high schools achieved bronze rating out of 698 Pennsylvania high schools reviewed.

== Extracurricular activities ==
The Southern Columbia Area School District offers a variety of clubs, activities and an extensive sports program. The sports programs are through the Pennsylvania Heartland Athletic Conference and the Pennsylvania Interscholastic Athletic Association. The Pennsylvania Heartland Athletic Conference is a voluntary association of 25 PIAA High Schools within the central Pennsylvania region. Southern Columbia currently holds the Pennsylvania state record for consecutive and total state football championships, with 7 and 15 respectively.

=== Sports ===
The district funds:

Boys

- Baseball - AA
- Basketball- AA
- Bowling - AAAA
- Cross country - A
- Football - AA
- Golf - AA
- Soccer - A
- Track and field
- Wrestling - AA

Girls

- Basketball - AA
- Bowling - AAAA
- Cross country - A
- Field hockey - AA
- Golf
- Soccer - A
- Softball - AA
- Track and field - AA

Junior high school sports

Boys

- Basketball
- Cross country
- Football
- Wrestling

Girls

- Basketball
- Cross country
- Field hockey
- Soccer

According to PIAA directory July 2012

== Notable alumni ==
- Henry Hynoski (Class of 2007), football player
- Julian Fleming (Class of 2020), football player
- Cal Haladay (Class of 2020), football player
- Preston Zachman (Class of 2020), football player
