= Cal Haladay =

American football player (born 2000)

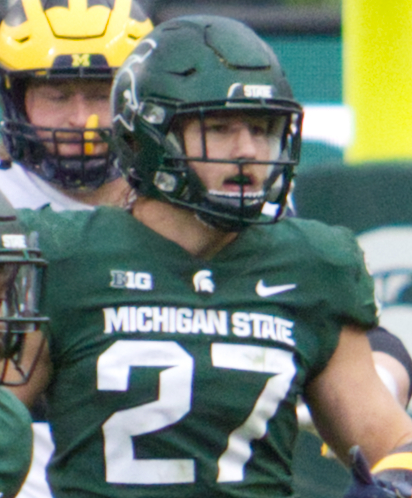
- Haladay in 2021

No. 27 – Michigan State Spartans
- Position: Linebacker
- Class: Redshirt Senior

Personal information
- Born: December 16, 2001 (age 24)
- Listed height: 6 ft 1 in (1.85 m)
- Listed weight: 235 lb (107 kg)

Career information
- High school: Southern Columbia Area
- College: Michigan State (2020–present)

Awards and highlights
- Second-team All-Big Ten (2022)
- Stats at ESPN

Cal Haladay (born December 16, 2000) is an American college football linebacker for the Michigan State Spartans.

== Early life ==
Haladay attended Southern Columbia Area High School in Elysburg, Pennsylvania. In his high school career he notched 334 tackles with 34 going for a loss, 14 sacks, two pass deflections, four interceptions, two fumble recoveries, and two forced fumbles. Haladay committed to play college football at Michigan State over other schools such as Michigan, Nebraska, and Pittsburgh.

== College career ==
As a freshman in 2020, Haladay redshirted and appeared in four games, recording no statistics. In week 5 of the 2021 season, he tallied ten tackles with one going for a loss, a fumble recovery, and a forced fumble in a 48–31 win over Western Kentucky. In week 7, Haladay intercepted a pass thrown by Jack Tuttle and returned it 30 yards for a touchdown, as helped the Spartans beat Indiana 20–15. In the season finale, he racked up 11 tackles with 2.5 being for a loss, 0.5 sack, and a forced fumble, as helped Michigan State beat Penn State 30–27. Haladay was named the defensive MVP of the 2021 Peach Bowl after recording a team-high 11 tackles and a 78-yard interception return for a touchdown to secure the Spartans' 31–21 victory. He finished the 2021 season with 96 tackles with five going for a loss, 0.5 sack, a pass deflection, two interceptions, a fumble recovery, two forced fumbles, and two touchdowns, earning Freshman All-American honors.

In the 2022 season opener, Haladay recorded a strip sack fumble and an interception in a 52–0 victory over Akron. In week 10 he totaled nine tackles with 3.5 being for a loss in a win over Illinois. For his performance, Haladay was named the Big Ten Conference defensive player of the week. The following week, he notched 19 tackles with one going for a loss, as helped the Spartans beat Rutgers 27–21. Haladay was named the Big Ten defensive player of the week for the second straight week. He finished the 2022 season with 120 tackles with 11 going for a loss, 1.5 sacks, a fumble recovery, and a forced fumble.

In Haladay was named to the second-team All-Big Ten by both the coaches and by the media. Ahead of the 2023 season, he was named to the watchlists for the Butkus Award, the Bronko Nagurski Trophy, and the Chuck Bednarik Award.
