= Playland Park (Houston, Texas) =

Former amusement park in Houston, Texas

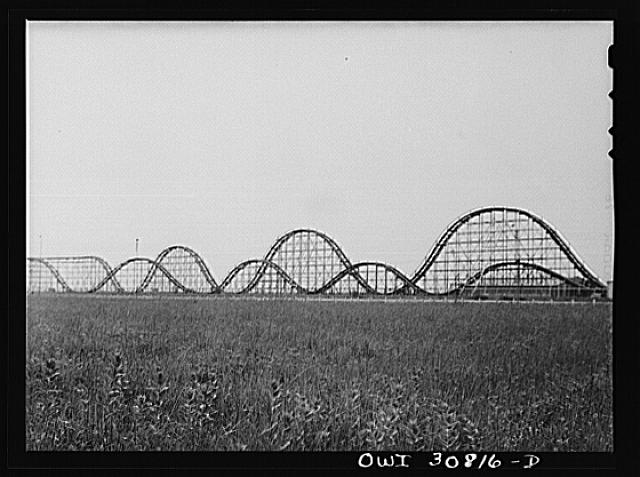
- Giant Skyrocket roller coaster, May 1943
- Interactive map of Playland Park
- Location: Houston, Texas, U.S.
- Coordinates: 29.6839°N 95.4213°W
- Status: Defunct
- Opened: 1940
- Closed: 1967
- Owner: Louis Slusky
- Slogan: "Fun for the whole family!"

Attractions
- Total: 10 - 30
- Roller coasters: 1

Playland Park was an amusement park located in Houston, Texas operating between 1940 and 1967. Louis Slusky opened Playland Park in 1940 at 9200 South Main. It is remembered for its wooden roller coaster, Giant Skyrocket. Texas' first elevated monorail train briefly operated near the park. Next to the park was an adjoining stock-car racetrack known as Playland Speedway. Playland Park closed in 1967, just prior to nearby AstroWorld opening in 1968. Several of its rides had already ceased operations years prior. By 1973, the land where the park once stood was entirely vacant. Years later, it was redeveloped into retail space and apartments.

Playland Park, Houston should not be confused with the Playland Park located in San Antonio, Texas which opened around the same time and had a wooden roller coaster similarly named The Rocket.

== Notable attractions ==
=== Giant Skyrocket ===
Giant Skyrocket was a wooden roller coaster relocated to Playland Park and opened in September 1941. Originally opened in 1924 at Houston’s former Venice Park, it was billed as the “largest roller coaster in the country" with a reported length of 6,600 feet (2,000 m), a height of 110 feet (34 m), and a drop of 90 feet (27 m). The original construction cost in 1924 was $75,000. The relocation from Venice Park to Playland Park was the last roller coaster project John A. Miller was involved with. Miller died in Houston in 1941 while working on this project.

The roller coaster, which was billed as the largest in the South, was operational until some time between 1962 and 1964. By 1964, it had been partially demolished and was no longer operational. This was done in order to make way for a new commercial building. The remainder of the roller coaster was torn down after the park closed in 1967.

=== Playland Speedway ===
The park's racetrack, known as the Playland Speedway, the Playland Park Speedway, and the Playland Park Stadium, opened in 1948. Various races and demolition derbies were held at the track. Local racing talent A. J. Foyt raced there. In 1959, a race car crashed through a fence, killing three people, including Playland Park co-owner Sam Slusky. Within a few years of the crash, the racetrack closed. By 1962, the viewing grandstands were removed, and by 1964, a new building had been constructed where the track once stood.

== See also ==
- List of defunct amusement parks
- Venice Park
- Six Flags AstroWorld
- Playland Park (San Antonio, Texas)
