= JKT =

JKT may refer to:

- Jacobus Kapteyn Telescope
- Jakarta, Indonesia
  - Kemayoran Airport, a former airport serving Jakarta
  - Jakarta Time; see Time in Indonesia
- Jetstar Hong Kong
- Jonathan Kreiss-Tomkins (born 1989), American politician and governor-elect of Alaska
- JKT48, an Indonesian idol group
- John Kilpatrick Turnpike, a toll road that forms the northern and western quadrants of the Oklahoma City beltway
