= Harold L. Ervin =

Superior court judge of Pennsylvania

Harold LeRoy Ervin (April 5, 1895 – November 26, 1990) was a member of the Superior Court of Pennsylvania from 1954 to 1967. He was the President Judge of the court from 1965 to 1967.

== Early life ==
Ervin was the son of Peter B. and Martha E. Ervin. His parents died when he was young and he was raised by his grandparents, John H. and Hannah H. Ervin in Catawissa, Pennsylvania. He finished elementary and high school in Catawissa while becoming interested in law from his childhood neighbor, Charles Fisher who was a local attorney.

After graduating from high school, Ervin attended Temple University where he was editor of The Temple News newspaper, a pitcher on the baseball team, and a member of Sigma Pi fraternity. He was able to complete his undergraduate degree in three years of taking classes where he tutored students and worked during the summers to pay his tuition. He also served as a second lieutenant of infantry in the U.S. Army during World War I. He attended the University of Pennsylvania Law School on a scholarship and graduated in 1920 with his LL.B. degree. During this time, he lived with his aunt and uncle (William H. and Agnes M. Brown) in Philadelphia.

After graduation, Ervin started his law practice in Media, Pennsylvania. He married Ruth Erdman and they had a son, Harold Jr., in 1924.

== Common Pleas Court ==
In July 1941, Ervin was appointed by Governor Arthur James to the Delaware County Common Pleas Court. He spent twelve years with the court and become the county’s presiding judge from 1948 to 1954.

== Superior Court of Pennsylvania ==
In 1953, Ervin ran for a spot on the Superior Court of Pennsylvania and won a ten-year term as a Republican. He took office on January 4, 1954. . At the end of his first term he was the senior judge on the court except for President Judge Chester H. Rhodes, who was ill for most of 1962 and 1963. During this time Ervin handled many of the administrative duties of the presiding judge. When he ran for re-election in 1963 he used this experience in his successful campaign.

Ervin went on to serve as President Judge in his own right from January 4, 1965 to December 31, 1967. As a judge his main focus was on moving cases more efficiently through the court system while still providing justice. He was able to keep the number of backlogged cases in Delaware County to a minimum.

== Retirement ==
Ervin retired from the court on January 1, 1968. His wife, Ruth, had died in February 1963. His son, who was also an attorney, died in 1972. He married a second time to Elsie Margaret Peterson. She died in 1985. He died in 1990.

Ervin was a member of the Masonic Lodge, the American Legion, and the Union League of Philadelphia.
