= Giant Skyrocket =

Wooden roller coaster

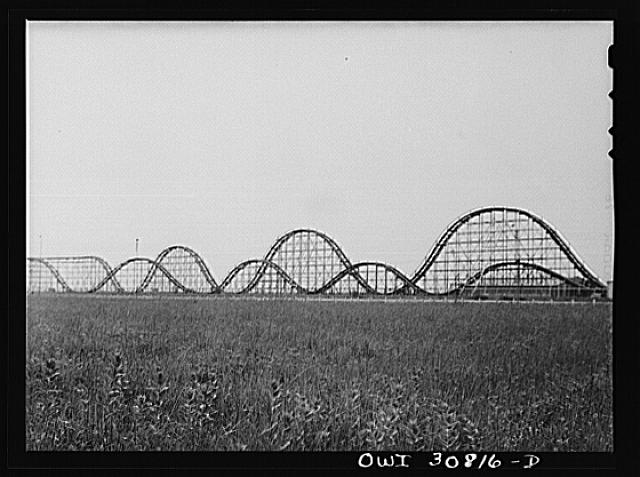
- Giant Skyrocket at Playland Park in 1943

Venice Park
- Coordinates: 29.685120°N 95.419708°W
- Status: Removed
- Opening date: September 5, 1941

Venice Park
- Coordinates: 29.777360°N 95.370619°W
- Status: Removed
- Opening date: June 28, 1924
- Closing date: ca.1932
- Cost: $75,000

General statistics
- Type: Wood
- Manufacturer: Lake Contrary Amusement Park
- Designer: Audley Ingersoll
- Height: 110 ft (34 m)
- Drop: 90 ft (27 m)
- Length: 6,600 ft (2,000 m)
- Giant Skyrocket at RCDB

Giant Skyrocket was a wooden roller coaster originally designed and built by Audley Ingersoll in 1924 for the now defunct Venice Park in Houston, Texas. It was one of the largest roller coasters built in the 1920s, and was Houston's first major roller coaster. It was later relocated to Houston's Playland Park with involvement from John A. Miller and H. S. Smith, where it operated until its closure in the early 1960s.

== History ==
The roller coaster was designed and fabricated at Lake Contrary Amusement Park in 1924 in St. Joseph, Missouri by Ingersoll before being shipped to Houston for assembly and construction.

It was an out-and-back design, with a long flat stretch after leaving the station until the first lift hill. It had a height of 110 feet and a 90 foot drop, with pictures suggesting an exceedingly steep angle. It continued through three more hills until turning approximately 90 degrees left and following a series of hills and turns before returning to the station, forming an "L" layout. The length was stated to be "a mile and a quarter", or 6,600 feet. At the time of its opening, it was reportedly the largest roller coaster in the United States.

=== Venice Park ===
1924 - 1930s

While Venice Park (originally known as Luna Park) was originally scheduled to open in May 1924, a storm damaged the park, including the roller coaster, which was still under construction at the time. After further construction delays, Giant Skyrocket opened to the public on June 28, 1924, 3 days after the park itself had opened. The cost of construction was reported to be $75,000. The roller coaster operated until the park closed around 1932.

From Luna Park advertisement placed in Houston Post on June 26, 1924

Undated photograph of Giant Skyrocket at Playland Park

=== Playland Park ===
1941 - 1960s

Playland Park opened in 1940. Sometime in 1941, Playland Park undertook the project to relocate the nearby roller coaster to the park. John A. Miller, a notable roller coaster designer, died in Houston in 1941 while working on this project. Playland Park credited H. S. Smith for the coaster's reconstruction. Comparing photographs shows the Playland Park coaster to not have retained the full length of its original form at Venice Park, having been seemingly modified and shortened.

The roller coaster opened on September 5, 1941. It was advertised as the "largest roller coaster in the South". Playland Park appears to have only referred to it as "Giant Roller Coaster" or simply "Roller Coaster". However, park guests generally continued to refer to it as "The Skyrocket".

While the park remained open until 1967, the roller coaster ceased operations sometime between 1962 and 1964. By 1964, it was partially removed to make room for a new commercial building. It was torn down in 1967 following the park's closure. By 1973, only an empty lot remained where it once stood.

=== Incidents ===
In October 1924, two passengers were killed in a fall from the coaster. In 1962, a passenger fell from the ride and was seriously injured.

=== Legacy ===
By 1964, the roller coaster had been partially removed at the turn hill. The portion of land it stood on had been sold by Playland Park, and a new commercial building was constructed in its place, which would become 2525 Murworth Drive. By 1973, the entire coaster was gone.

Built during the golden era of wooden coaster design, Giant Skyrocket is one of the few that survived well beyond the Great Depression, albeit in a shortened form at a new location.
