= Venice Park (Houston) =

Former amusement park in Houston, Texas

Luna Park
- Location: Houston, Texas, United States
- Status: Defunct
- Opened: 1924
- Closed: ca. 1934

Venice Park (originally Luna Park) was an amusement park in Houston, Texas that operated from 1924 to around 1934. The 36-acre (150,000 m^{2}) park was built at a cost of $325,000 and featured a carousel, picnic areas, live entertainment (including diving horses), a dance hall, and various mechanical rides, including the Giant Skyrocket roller coaster. At its inception, it was a trolley park.

== History ==
Located on the banks of White Oak Bayou, Venice Park opened to the public for the first time on June 26, 1924, then known as Luna Park. Contemporary press coverage stated that the park had "virtually every variety of amusement device known in the world of showdom”. Houston's first roller coaster, the 100-foot (30 m)-tall Giant Skyrocket, featured an 84-foot (26 m) drop and was billed as the "largest" and "highest" roller coaster in the United States at that time, with a length of more than 1.25 miles (2 km). The popularity of Giant Skyrocket was immense, as it carried between 2500 and 3000 passengers daily.

In addition, a "monstrous seaplane swing" operated at the park, as did a Caterpillar, a merry-go-round, Dodgems, a "baby airplane swing", a junior Ferris wheel, a miniature railway, and several other rides. The park's grand pavilion was also advertised as the largest in the American South. Live entertainment was offered in the form of aerobatics, little people (billed as Williamson's Midget City), and shows entitled "See America First" and "The Mysterious Sensation".

In addition to the mechanical rides, Venice Park patrons were offered a variety of activities, including boxing and wrestling exhibitions, dance marathons, beauty pageants, and a variety of outdoor competitions. By 1928, the park was observing the Mexican Independence Day, with activities organized by the Mexican consulate, including "patriotic speeches, patriotic music, and the reading of the Mexican Declaration of Independence". In 1929, the success of the dancing marathons prompted the park to schedule a "floating marathon" in a water tank specially built for the event.

In 1926, park's original owners sold the property to Abe W. Wagner, a local lawyer, who held a contest to choose a new name. The winning name was Venice Park.

By 1934, Giant Skyrocket had closed and been relocated to nearby Playland Park.

Today, the park's land is occupied by various businesses near a small residential development.

== Incidents ==
- A 1924 lawsuit filed by a park guest accused park employees of treating her roughly as she was waiting in line for the Giant Skyrocket.
- Two guests were killed in a fall from Giant Skyrocket in October 1924.
- Professional parachutist Montie LeMay died in the park in October 1924 when her parachute failed to open after attempting a stunt.
