= Playland Park (San Antonio, Texas) =

Former amusement park in San Antonio, Texas

- Interactive map of Playland Park
- Location: San Antonio, Texas, U.S.
- Coordinates: 29.6840°N 95.4217°W
- Status: Defunct
- Opened: May 15, 1943
- Closed: September 1, 1980
- Owner: Jimmy Johnson
- Slogan: "The fun spot of San Antonio!"

Attractions
- Total: 16
- Roller coasters: 1

Playland Park was an amusement park formerly located in San Antonio, Texas. Playland Park opened in 1943 and was owned by Jimmy Johnson. Prior to this it operated as a small venue at Brackenridge Park. It was the original home of The Rocket, a popular wooden roller coaster currently located at Knoebels Amusement Resort. Ed Gaida, who lived at Playland Park and had access to records and archives, wrote a book about the park and its owner.

Playland Park closed on September 1, 1980. For several decades, the original "Playland" sign stood at the original gate as the last remnant of the park. Today, the location is a campus of the Alamo Colleges District and no trace remains of the original park.

Playland Park of San Antonio, Texas should not be confused with Playland Park of Houston, Texas which operated around the same time and had a wooden roller coaster similarly named The Skyrocket. These two parks operated independently of each other.

== The Rocket ==
The Rocket was designed and built by Herbert Paul Schmeck and the Philadelphia Toboggan Company. The roller coaster operated from 1947 until the park's closure in 1980. Knoebels Amusement Resort in Elysburg, Pennsylvania purchased the ride in 1984 and dismantled it in early 1985. As there were no blueprints to work with, each individual board was numbered and cataloged on site. The restored roller coaster opened at Knoebels on June 15, 1985, as Phoenix.

== See also ==
- List of abandoned amusement parks
- Playland Park (Houston, Texas)
