= Knoebels Amusement Resort =

Amusement park in Elysburg, Pennsylvania

- Previously known as: Knoebels Grove; Knoebels Amusement Park
- Interactive map of Knoebels Amusement Resort
- Location: Elysburg, Pennsylvania, United States
- Coordinates: 40.879°N 76.505°W
- Opened: July 4, 1926; 100 years ago
- Owner: Knoebel family
- Slogan: "Fun, food, and fantasy!"
- Operating season: April–September (limited days in October–January for seasonal events)
- Area: 150 acres (61 ha)

Attractions
- Total: 58
- Roller coasters: 6
- Water rides: 2
- Website: knoebels.com

Knoebels Amusement Resort (/kəˈnoʊbəlz/) (oftened shortened to just Knoebels) is a family-owned and operated amusement park, picnic grove, and campground in Elysburg, Pennsylvania. Opened in 1926, it is the United States' largest free-admission park. Visitors are able to ride the park's attractions by purchasing unlimited-access wristbands, limited-access hand stamps, or books of tickets.

The amusement park is owned and operated by the Knoebel family. The park's name has traditionally been spelled "Knoebels" without an apostrophe, and appears that way on all official park advertising and correspondence.

The park has 58 rides, including three wooden roller coasters, three steel roller coasters, a 1913 carousel, and a dark ride. The park and its rides have won awards from organizations such as Amusement Today, American Coaster Enthusiasts (ACE), and the International Association of Amusement Parks and Attractions (IAAPA). In 2014, Travel Channel rated Knoebels one of their Top 10 Family Friendly Amusement Parks in the United States, and in 2026, TripAdvisor ranked it as the number one amusement park in the United States.

== History ==
Knoebels is located in a small wooded valley in central Pennsylvania. In 1828, a local man by the name of Henry Knoebel purchased the land for $931 (equivalent to $32,360 in 2026). The valley, originally known as Peggy's Farm, was used as farming land until the early 1900s, when a creek-fed swimming hole was introduced. Knoebel turned the property into a popular picnic destination, attracting Sunday travelers and horse-drawn hayride wagons. Soft drinks, ice cream, and snacks were sold to visitors. As the popularity of the area (which was known as Knoebels Grove by this point) grew, the owners leased plots of land along the creeks for use as summer cottage sites. Some of these privately owned cottages still exist on the property today.

=== Development of select park features ===
In 1926, Knoebels added a restaurant, a steam-powered Philadelphia Toboggan Coasters (PTC) carousel, and a few simple games to the grove, marking the beginning of Knoebels Amusement Park. On July 4, 1926, a large concrete swimming pool was opened on the site of the original swimming hole. Featuring a filtration system that provided clean water instead of muddy creek water, the pool was named Crystal Pool. Since then, the park has developed around the pool, adding rides, games, concession stands, and other attractions.

In 1962, a campground with six sites opened behind the amusement park. As of 2004, the campground spanned 160 acres (65 ha) with 500 campsites.

After the 1972 flood, the roller rink building was re-floored and used as a skating rink until the mid-1980s, when it was converted into the Roaring Creek Saloon. The building now contains a concession stand, an arcade, the XD Theater, and a place for live performances.

In 1973, the Haunted Mansion dark ride opened. The ride has been recognized as one of America's best dark rides by organizations such as Dark Ride and Funhouse Enthusiasts (DAFE) and the National Amusement Park Historical Association (NAPHA). In 2008, it was the subject of a one-hour documentary, "Laff In The Dark's Behind The Scenes At Knoebel's Haunted House".

From 2007 to 2019, the park's Grand Carousel was consistently voted the best carousel in the Golden Ticket Awards. The carousel competition was retired in 2019 because the Grand Carousel was undefeated.

For the 2013 season, Knoebels added StratosFear, the park's tallest ride at 148 feet (45 m). In October of that season, Flying Turns, a wooden bobsled coaster inspired by similar early 20th century rides, opened after seven years of delays.

In 2015, a new roller coaster named Impulse opened, replacing two former rides: Bumper Boats and Boat Tag.

In 2023, the Pennsylvania Trolley Museum acquired a trolley that had been converted into a cottage at Knoebels.

Richard “Dick” Knoebel, who was the long-standing president of the park and led many significant projects, died at the age of 87 in July 2026.

=== Floods ===
Because the park sits at the confluence of the South Branch Roaring Creek and Mugser Run creeks, it has suffered several major floods and a marker at the park shows the flood levels for them.

- June 1972: Resulting from Hurricane Agnes, this was the park's worst flood. The creeks rose 6 feet (1.8 m) over their banks. The flood destroyed six cottages and damaged many other buildings, including 24 of the park's then-25 rides, as well as the roller rink.
- September 1975: Resulting from Hurricane Eloise
- January 1996: Resulting from a blizzard that was followed by a quick thaw
- September 2004: Resulting from Hurricane Ivan
- June 2006: Resulting from heavy rains
- September 2011: Resulting from Tropical Storm Lee, this was the park's second-worst flood with waters reaching nearly as high as the 1972 flood.
- July 2018: Resulting from heavy rains and flash flooding

== Rides and attractions ==
=== Roller coasters ===
Knoebels has six operating roller coasters. Knoebels' two main wooden roller coasters are well-known, with Phoenix consistently rated in top ten lists and Twister ranking high as well.

Ride	Opened	Manufacturer	Description	Photo
Phoenix	1985	Designed by Herbert Paul Schmeck, built by Philadelphia Toboggan Coasters	A relocated and restored Herbert Paul Schmeck/Philadelphia Toboggan Coasters wooden roller coaster. This coaster has consistently been rated as one of the top ten wooden roller coasters in the Golden Ticket Awards, placing first every year since 2018. The ride was originally built in 1947 and known as The Rocket. It was purchased from Playland Park in San Antonio, Texas after the park's 1980 closure. It was moved to Knoebels in 1985. It utilizes buzz bars.	
Twister	1999	Designed by John Fetterman, built in-house	A wooden roller coaster heavily inspired by Mr. Twister, a 1964 Philadelphia Toboggan Coasters ride that was designed by John Allen.	
Flying Turns	2013	Designed by John Fetterman, built in-house	A wooden bobsled roller coaster modeled after a 1920s John Norman Bartlett and John A. Miller design and built on the site of the former Whirlwind coaster. The coaster was completed in 2007, but its opening was pushed back numerous times due to problems with cars navigating the course. It opened on October 5, 2013. It won the Golden Ticket Award for Best New Ride in 2014.	
Kozmo's Kurves	2009	E&F Miler Industries	A steel children's roller coaster that operates on the site of the former High Speed Thrill Coaster	
Black Diamond	2011	Philadelphia Toboggan Coasters	A steel enclosed roller coaster. It was originally known as Golden Nugget and operated at Dinosaur Beach in Wildwood, New Jersey from 1960 to 1998. The ride was eventually purchased by Knoebels, and was built on the former site of the relocated Bald Eagle Habitat. The name change to Black Diamond was in recognition of the anthracite coal industry, which is prevalent in the area.	
Impulse	2015	Zierer	A steel roller coaster. It has a high-hat initial rise to 98 feet (30 m), and features a cobra roll, a vertical inversion, and a zero-g roll. It replaced Bumper Boats and Boat Tag.	

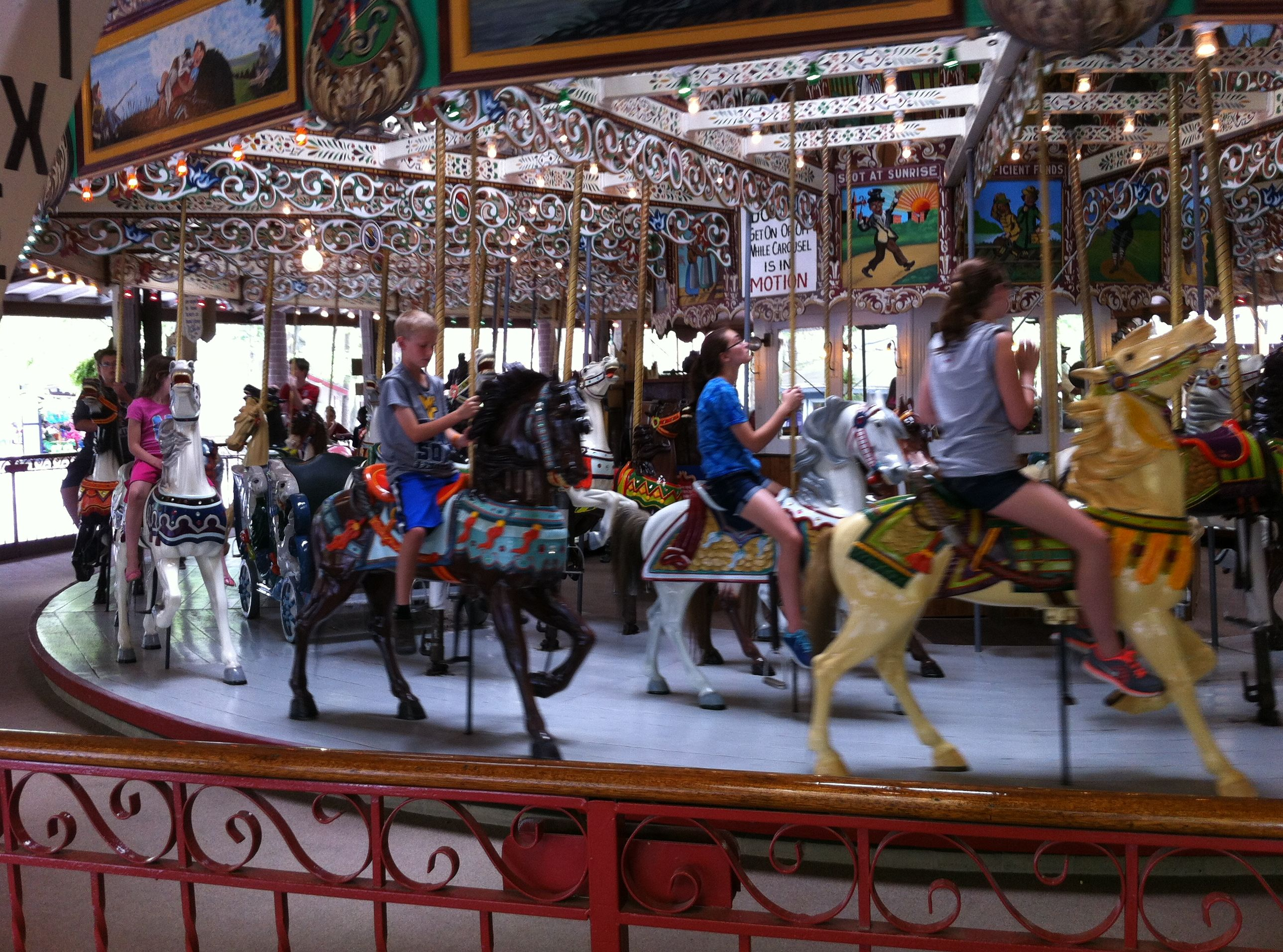
Grand Carousel

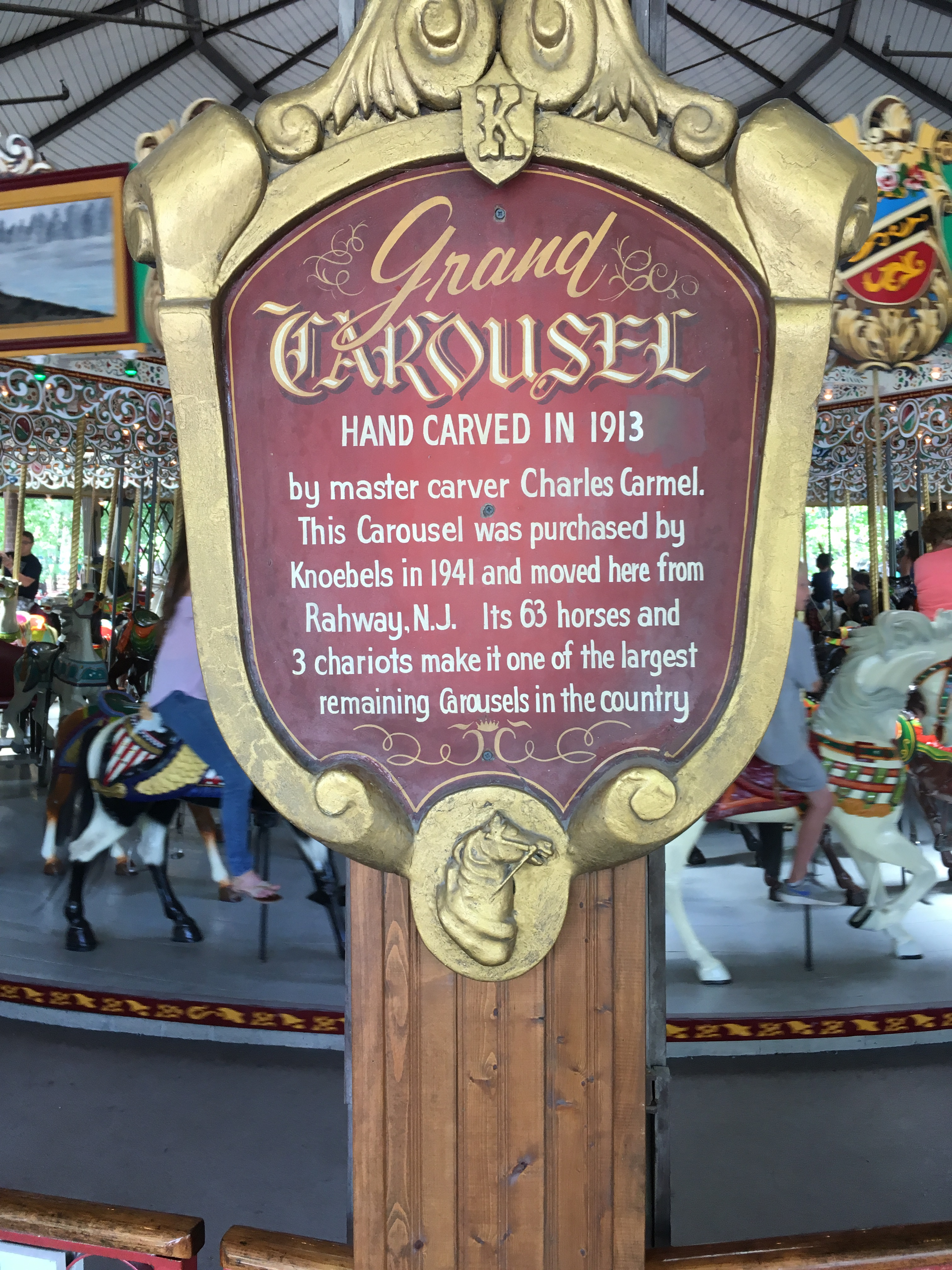
Grand Carousel sign

=== Rides ===
Haunted Mansion dark ride

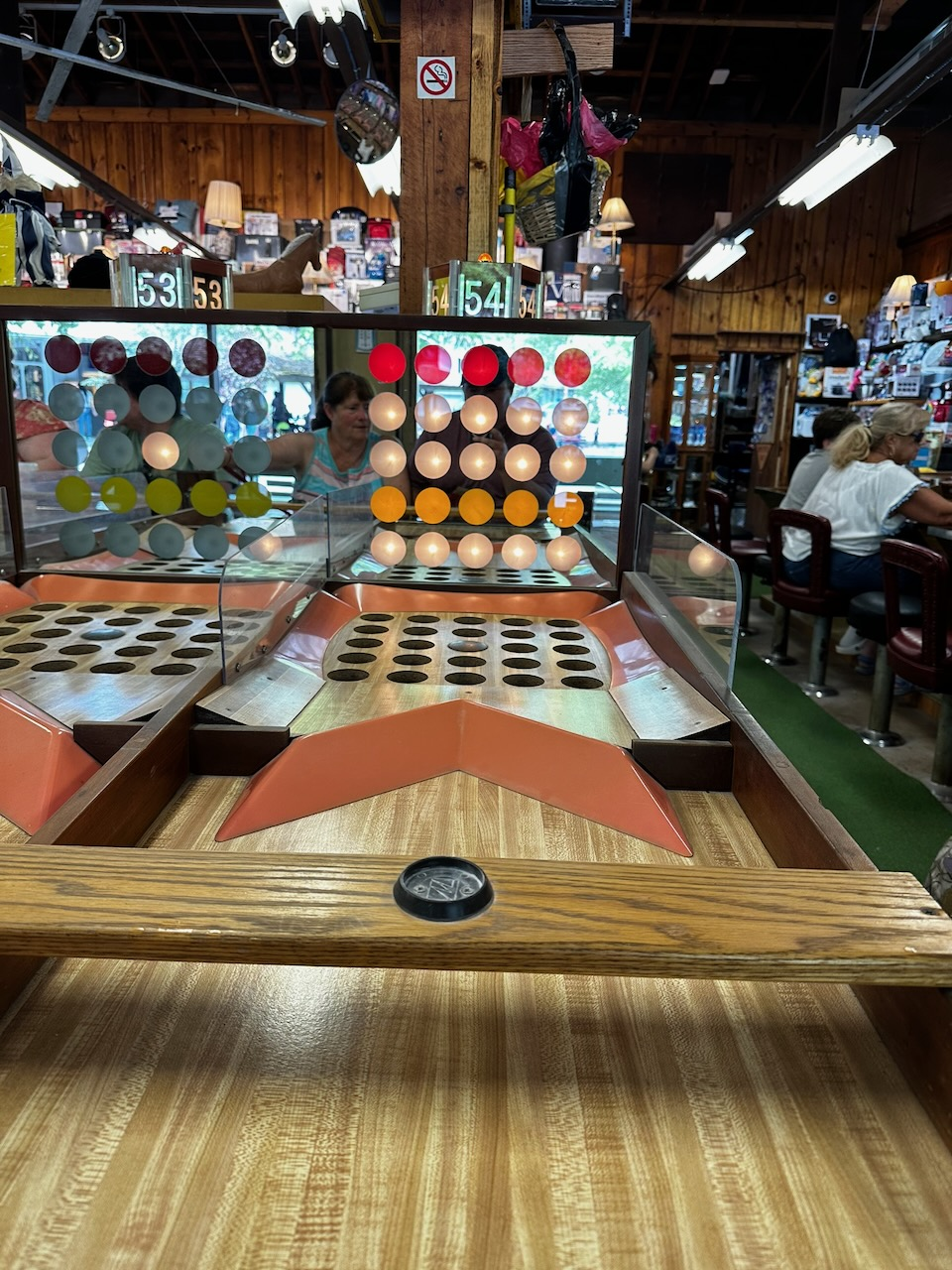
Knoebels' Fascination machine

Ride	Opened	Manufacturer	Description
Bumper Cars	1940	Lusse	Bumper cars
Grand Carousel	1942	Kremer's Carousel Works, Charles I. D. Looff, and Charles Carmel	A carousel that was originally built in 1913. It was purchased from Riverside Park in Piscataway Township, New Jersey. One of the largest carousels in the world, with 63 horses and 3 chariots. One of few carousels remaining with a working ring dispenser game. Three band organs provide its music.
Whipper	1944	William F. Mangels	A The Whip originally built in 1915. Purchased from Croop's Glen in Hunlock Creek, Pennsylvania.
Kiddie Wheel	1945	Unknown	A children's Ferris wheel
Looper	1948	Allan Herschell Company	A restored Looper
Pete's Fleet	1950	Allan Herschell Company	A children's spinning boat ride
Sky Slide	1950	In-house	A helter skelter. Has been out of operation for several years pending a refurbishment.
Roto-Jets	1952	Kasper Klaus	An elevated spinning ride
Hand Cars	1955	Unknown	A children's rider-powered car ride
Motor Boats	1955	Unknown	A boat ride
Helicopters	1960	Allan Herschell Company	A children's spinning helicopter ride
Ole Smokey Train	1960	Crown Metal Products	A 16 in (406 mm) gauge anthracite coal-fueled steam locomotive
Paratrooper	1960	Frank Hrubetz & Company	A Paratrooper
Pioneer Train	1960	Allan Herschell Company	A 16 in (406 mm) gauge gasoline-powered half-mile railroad
Merry Mixer	1967	Garbrick Amusements, Inc.	A Scrambler
Jet Skyfighter	1968	Unknown	A children's spinning rocket ship ride
Kiddie Boats	1968	Unknown	A children's spinning boat ride
Panther Cars	1968	Philadelphia Toboggan Company	A children's car ride
Satellite	1970	Eyerly Aircraft Company	A Roll-O-Plane
Flyer	1972	Bisch Rocco	A Flying Scooters
Haunted Mansion	1973	Unknown	A dark ride
S&G Carousel	1976	Stein & Goldstein	A carousel that was originally built in 1910. One of only two Stein & Goldstein carousels still in operation.
Super Round-Up	1976	Frank Hrubetz & Company	A Round-Up. Has been out of operation since 2025 pending a refurbishment.
Tea Cups	1980	Philadelphia Toboggan Coasters	Teacups
Red Baron	1982	Unknown	A children's spinning plane ride
Spanish Bambini	1986	Unknown	A children's spinning car ride
Antique Cars	1990	D. H. Morgan Manufacturing	An Antique Car ride. The original cars were purchased at auction from Rocky Glen Park in Moosic, Pennsylvania after its 1987 closure.
Giant Flume	1990	Hopkins Rides	A log flume
Kiddie Bumper Cars	1990	Soli	Children's bumper cars
Kiddie Firetrucks	1990	William F. Mangels	A children's spinning fire truck ride
Kiddie Whip	1990	William F. Mangels	A children's The Whip
Flying Tigers	1991	Zamperla	A children's spinning ride
Giant Wheel	1991	Chance Rides	A 110-foot (34 m) Ferris wheel
Tilt-A-Whirl	1991	Sellner Manufacturing	A Tilt-A-Whirl
Balloon Race	1992	Unknown	A Balloon Race
Paradrop	1995	Unknown	A parachute tower
Sklooosh!	1997	Hopkins Rides	A shoot the-chute
Cosmotron	1998	Wisdom Rides	An enclosed Himalaya
Italian Trapeze	1999	Zamperla	A swing ride
Crazy Sub	2000	Zamperla	A children's swinging ride
PowerSurge	2000	Zamperla	A spinning ride
Umbrella Ride	2000	Hampton Amusement Company	A children's spinning car ride
Scenic Skyway	2003	Hopkins Rides	A chairlift. Formerly known as Spring Fling when it operated at Sugarbush Resort.
Goin' Buggy	2009	Zamperla	A children's spinning ride. Originally operated at Kentucky Kingdom in Louisville, Kentucky and later at Geauga Lake in Aurora, Ohio.
Kiddie Himalaya	2009	Unknown	A children's Himalaya
Fandango	2010	Moser's Rides	A Frisbee
Ribbit	2011	Moser's Rides	A children's drop tower
StratosFear	2013	A.R.M. Rides, Larson International	A 148-foot (45 m) drop tower, the tallest ride at Knoebels.
Pony Carts	2014	Unknown	A children's spinning pony ride
Galleon	2016	Zamperla	A swinging ship
Downdraft	2019	Battech Enterprises	A Downdraft
Tumbling Timbers	2019	SBF Visa Group	A spinning ride
Tornado	2021	Wisdom Rides	A Tornado
Rock-O-Plane	2024	Eyerly Aircraft Company	A Rock-O-Plane. Purchased from Joyland Amusement Park in Lubbock, Texas after its 2022 closure.
Bayern Kurve	TBD	Schwarzkopf	A refurbished Bayern Kurve
Kiddie Turtles	TBD	R. E. Chambers Company	A spinning children's ride relocated from Conneaut Lake Park

=== Former rides ===
- 1001 Nacht - HUSS Park Attractions/Weber - 1001 Nights
- Axis - Zamperla Mixer
- Boat Tag - Boat ride
- Bumper Boats - Bumper boats
- Eli Ferris Wheel - Eli Bridge Company - Ferris wheel
- Flying Cages
- Fire Ball
- Frog Hopper - Children's drop tower
- German Carousel - Wilhelm Hennecke Uelzen
- Hey Dey - Spillman Manufacturing
- High Speed Thrill Coaster - Overland Amusements - Steel children's roller coaster that operated from 1955 to 2008
- Jet Star - Schwarzkopf - Steel Jet Star roller coaster that operated from 1977 to 1992. The ride was purchased from independent operators from Coney Island who had fallen on hard times. After being removed from Knoebels, it was relocated to Morey's Piers in Wildwood, New Jersey, where it operated under the same name. In 2000, the coaster was sold to a traveling showman in France.
- Kiddie Carousel - Allan Herschell Company
- Kiddie Cars - Allan Herschell Company
- Kiddie Planes
- Lindy Loop - Spillman Manufacturing
- Merry-Go-Round - Edward Joy Morris
- Moon Rocker - Overland Amusements
- Spindle
- Space Ship - Converted into Sky Slide
- Strat-O-Ship
- Over the Top - SBF Visa Group - Operated for only a few weeks in 2018 before being removed due to complications
- Wipeout - Removed following the 2020 season
- The Whip - Earlier 8-car model replaced by the 12-car Whipper
- Whirlwind - Vekoma - A steel roller coaster that operated on the site of the former Jet Star coaster from 1993 to 2004. This ride was purchased from Playland in New York, where it operated from 1984 to 1992 under the same name before being moved to Knoebels. After the 2004 operating season, the ride was moved to Parque Diversiones in San José, Costa Rica, where it now operates under the name Bocaraca.

=== Restaurants and food ===
Knoebels has several restaurants throughout the park. These eateries have contributed to the park winning awards from organizations which judge amusement park food, including Amusement Today's Golden Ticket Award for Best Food every year from 2000 to 2012. The park tied with Dollywood in 2013, but Knoebels reclaimed the title in 2015, 2016, and 2018. In 2025, Amusement Today magazine retired the Best Food contest and awarded Knoebels their "Legend" Golden Ticket Award for the category.

The park's Cesari's Pizza (now simply named Pizza) and the International Food Court were featured on a Food Network special. The alligator bites served at the International Food Court were selected by Delish.com as one of the top seven most daring amusement park foods.

=== Three Ponds Golf Course ===
Knoebels' Three Ponds Golf Course is located roughly a quarter mile from the park and campground. It is a par 71 eighteen-hole golf course which provides two nine-hole layouts. There is also a restaurant on the golf course grounds.

== Incidents ==
- On June 13, 2003, a man was seriously injured in a 30-foot (9.1 m) fall from the Scenic Skyway chairlift ride. The man was a member of a group home for mentally disabled people and was riding alone. He was airlifted to a local hospital and recovered. The ride had opened to the public only two weeks before the accident. Inspectors found no problems with the ride.
- On July 6, 2011, a young boy was found face down in the Crystal Pool. Lifeguard performed CPR on the boy, and by the time the ambulance arrived, he had obtained a heartbeat and was breathing on his own. However, he later died at Geisinger Medical Center from breathing complications. It was later determined that the child suffered from a pre-existing heart condition that is associated with Noonan syndrome.
- On March 26, 2015, a worker suffered cuts to the back of his head and hand after being hit by one of the Impulse coaster's trains. The ride was being tested before its public debut a month later. He was taken to a nearby hospital and recovered.
- On July 16, 2016, a young boy died after he was found unresponsive in the Crystal Pool. He was rushed to a nearby hospital, where he was pronounced dead.
- On August 15, 2016, at around 4:30 p.m., an 11-year-old girl from Hellertown, Pennsylvania was injured when a 40-foot tree fell onto her family's campsite in a strong gust of wind. The girl, her father, and her two siblings were all taken to a nearby hospital for treatment, where she remained in critical condition.
- On July 15, 2023, a woman was stabbed at the campground during an altercation with another guest. After a cooler of ice water was dumped on her daughter's head, 32-year-old Jessica Bertholf grabbed a knife and tried to slash the truck tires of the person who dumped the water. The victim tried to defend herself against Bertholf, who slashed the victim across the neck with the knife. The victim survived her injuries and Bertholf was taken to jail facing charges of aggravated assault.
- On March 2, 1999, an attorney representing two girls who sustained injuries while riding the park's Speed Slide discovered a history of 15 complaints of injuries on the same ride. The tort lawsuit filed sought $9,200 in medical costs and at least $50,000 in damages on behalf of one girl, age 11. The suit also sought $5,300 in medical costs and at least $100,000 in damages on behalf of the other girl, age 12. Both girls had undergone emergency surgery as a result of their injuries. The park was charged with negligence, failure to monitor the force of the water and its effect on riders, failure to fix defects, and failure to provide adequate warnings to riders. Both girls fully recovered.

== See also ==
- Lawrence L. Knoebel Covered Bridge
- List of incidents at independent amusement parks
