= Phoenix (roller coaster) =

Roller coaster at Knoebels Amusement Resort

- Previously known as The Rocket (1947–1980)
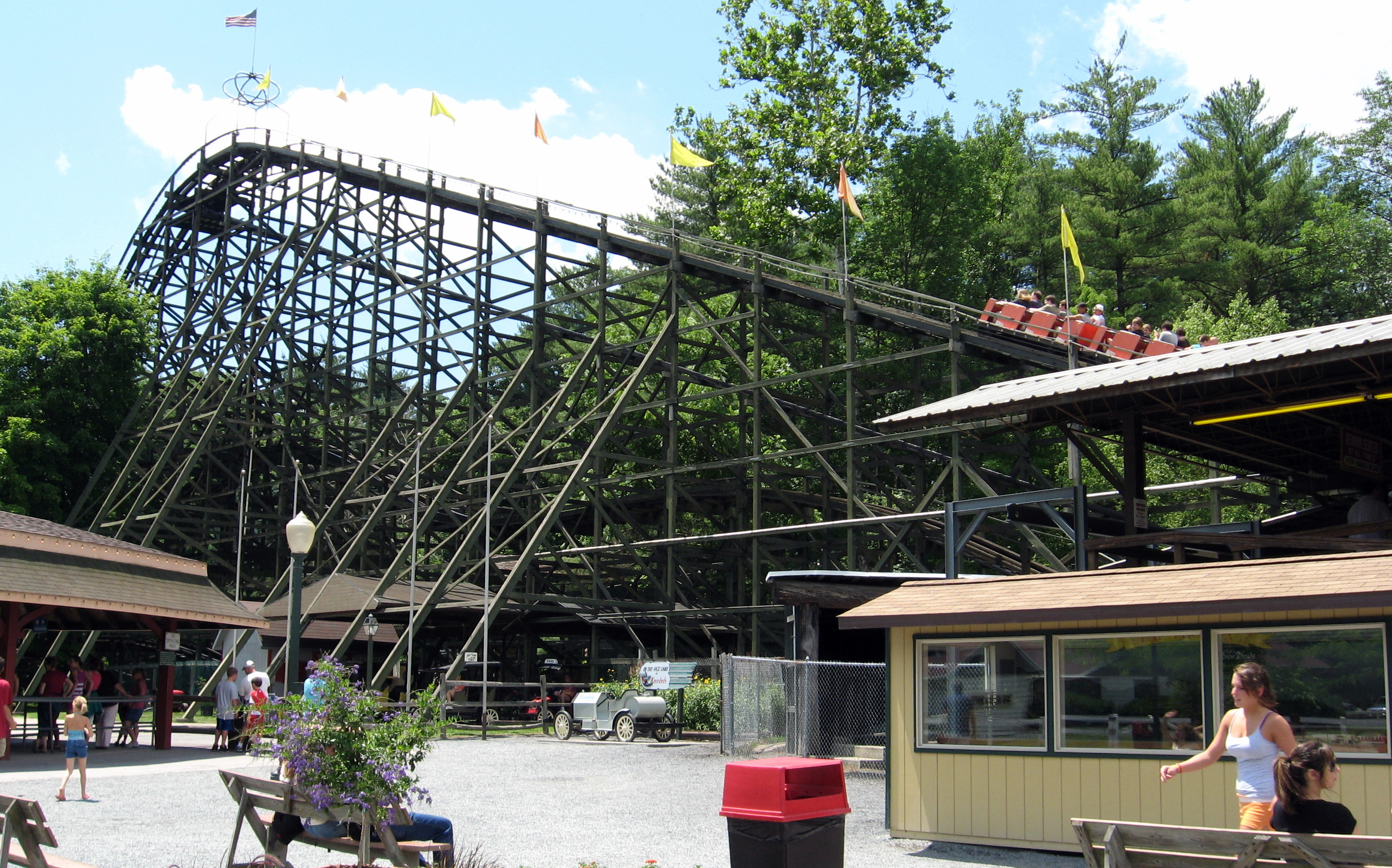
- Lift hill of Phoenix

Knoebels Amusement Resort
- Location: Knoebels Amusement Resort
- Coordinates: 40°52′42″N 76°30′23″W
- Status: Operating
- Opening date: June 15, 1985
- Cost: $1,500,000

General statistics
- Type: Wood
- Manufacturer: Philadelphia Toboggan Coasters
- Designer: Herbert Paul Schmeck
- Track layout: Double out-and-back
- Lift/launch system: Chain lift hill
- Height: 78 ft (24 m)
- Drop: 72 ft (22 m)
- Length: 3,200 ft (980 m)
- Speed: 45 mph (72 km/h)
- Inversions: 0
- Duration: 2:00
- Capacity: 720 riders per hour
- Height restriction: 42 in (107 cm)
- Trains: 2 trains with 4 cars; riders arranged 2 across in 3 rows for a total of 24 riders per train
- Phoenix at RCDB

Video

Phoenix is a wooden roller coaster located at Knoebels Amusement Resort in Elysburg, Pennsylvania. It was moved to its current location in central Pennsylvania in 1985. Prior to its purchase and relocation to Knoebels, it operated under the name The Rocket at Playland Park in San Antonio, Texas.

== History ==
Phoenix was designed and built by Herbert Paul Schmeck and Philadelphia Toboggan Coasters (PTC). It operated as "The Rocket" at Playland Park in San Antonio, Texas from 1947 until the park's closure in 1980. At its opening, The Rocket was hailed as "the largest roller coaster in the world", with 3,200 feet of track and a 78-foot lift hill. Knoebels purchased the ride in 1984 and dismantled it starting in January 1985. As there were no blueprints to work with, each individual board was numbered and cataloged on site.

Since 1986, Knoebels has held the "Phoenix Phall Phun Phest", a yearly October event for roller coaster enthusiasts. The event was voted the third best Halloween event in 2008 and 2009 in an Amusement Today survey.

== Ride experience ==
The ride features two PTC trains, one yellow and one orange, each capable of accommodating 24 passengers. The trains feature buzz bars as a form of restraint, and do not feature seatbelts. After being dispatched, the train takes a sharp right turn as it exits the station and enters a dark tunnel. Upon reaching the end of the tunnel, the train ascends the 78-foot lift hill. After reaching the top of the lift hill, the train drops down a 72-foot initial descent before entering the first turnaround.

Following a leftward turn, the train descends to ground level and traverses two smaller airtime hills before ascending into the second turnaround. Now running parallel to the lift hill, the train descends another drop, and hits a double-up, followed immediately afterwards by a double-down. The train then rises up into a final turnaround, wrapping around the outer side of the initial turnaround's structure. Subsequently, the train traverses a series of four consecutive bunny airtime hills before hitting the brake run, making a right hand turn to return to the station.

== Awards and rankings ==
Phoenix has consistently ranked among the top 10 wooden roller coasters in various polls such as the annual Golden Ticket Awards from Amusement Today magazine, and won the title of Best Wooden Coaster from 2018 to 2025. It was also awarded the Coaster Landmark designation by American Coaster Enthusiasts.

Golden Ticket Awards: Top wood Roller Coasters
Year									1998	1999
Ranking									10	6
Year	2000	2001	2002	2003	2004	2005	2006	2007	2008	2009
Ranking	5	4	5	4	4	4	5	3	3	4
Year	2010	2011	2012	2013	2014	2015	2016	2017	2018	2019
Ranking	3	2	3	3	4	3	2	2	1	1
Year	2020	2021	2022	2023	2024	2025	2026			
Ranking	N/A	1	1	1	1	1	2			

NAPHA Members Survey: Favorite Wood Roller Coaster
Year	2005	2006	2007	2008	2009	2010	2011	2012	2013	2014	2015	2016	2017	2018	2019	2020
Ranking	1	1	1 (tie)	2	2	2	1	1	1	1	1	1	1	1	1	1
