= Catawissa, Pennsylvania =

Borough in Pennsylvania, US

- Borough
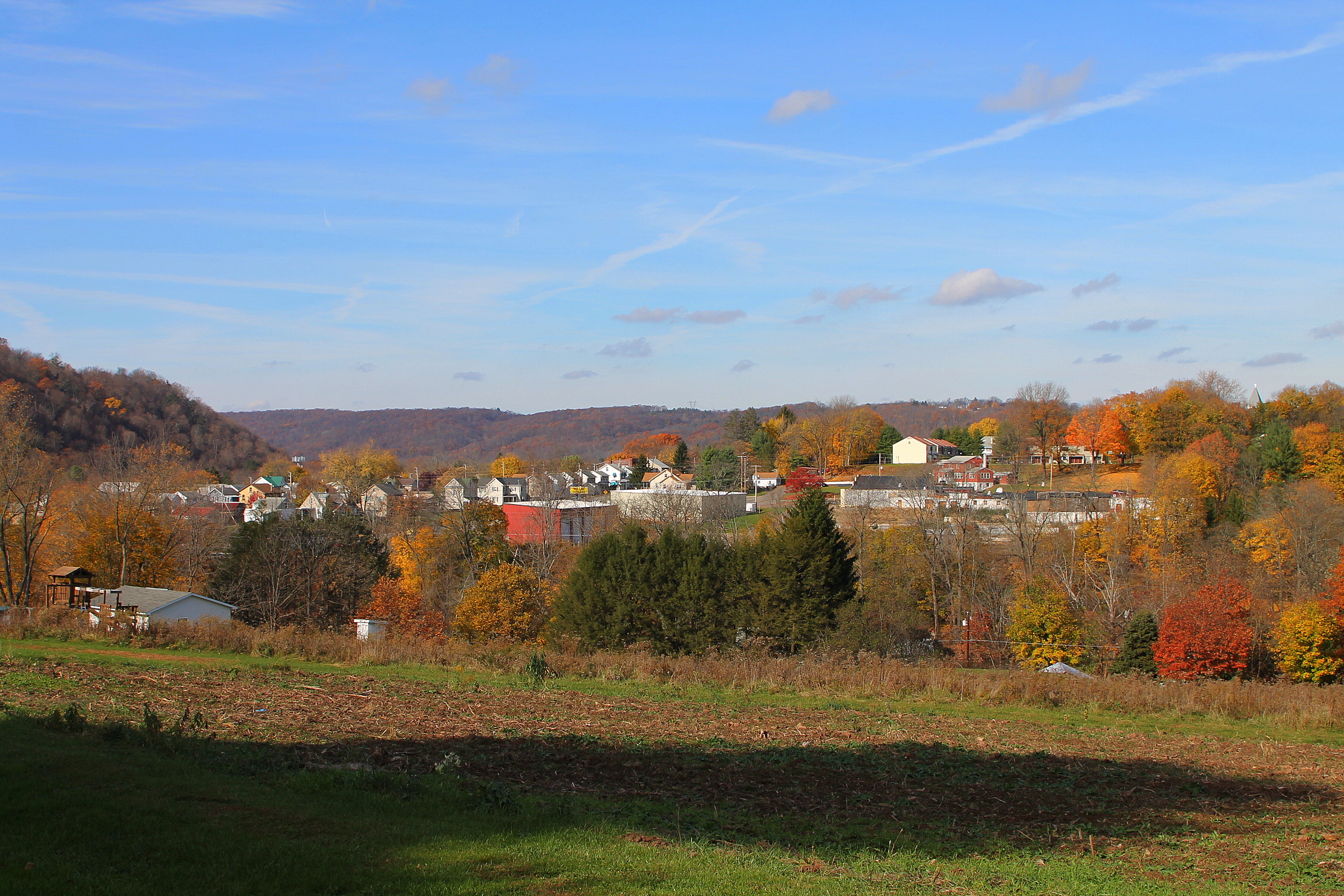
- Catawissa from the southwest
- Nickname: Home of a Covered Bridge
- Location of Catawissa in Columbia County, Pennsylvania.

- Location of Columbia County in Pennsylvania

- Location in Pennsylvania Catawissa (the United States)
- Coordinates: 40°57′09″N 76°27′37″W
- Country: United States
- State: Pennsylvania
- County: Columbia
- Settled: 1774
- Incorporated: 1892

Government
  - Type: Borough Council
  - Council President: Sue Helwig

Area
  - Total: 0.54 sq mi (1.39 km^{2})
  - Land: 0.51 sq mi (1.33 km^{2})
  - Water: 0.023 sq mi (0.06 km^{2})
- Elevation: 520 ft (160 m)

Population (2020)
  - Total: 1,536
  - Density: 2,992.1/sq mi (1,155.26/km^{2})
- Time zone: UTC-5 (Eastern (EST))
  - Summer (DST): UTC-4 (EDT)
- ZIP Code: 17820
- Area code: 570
- FIPS code: 42-11736
- Website: www.catawissa.us

Catawissa is a borough in Columbia County, Pennsylvania, United States. It is part of the Susquehanna Valley in Pennsylvania. The population was 1,539 at the 2020 census. It is part of the Bloomsburg-Berwick micropolitan area.

== History ==
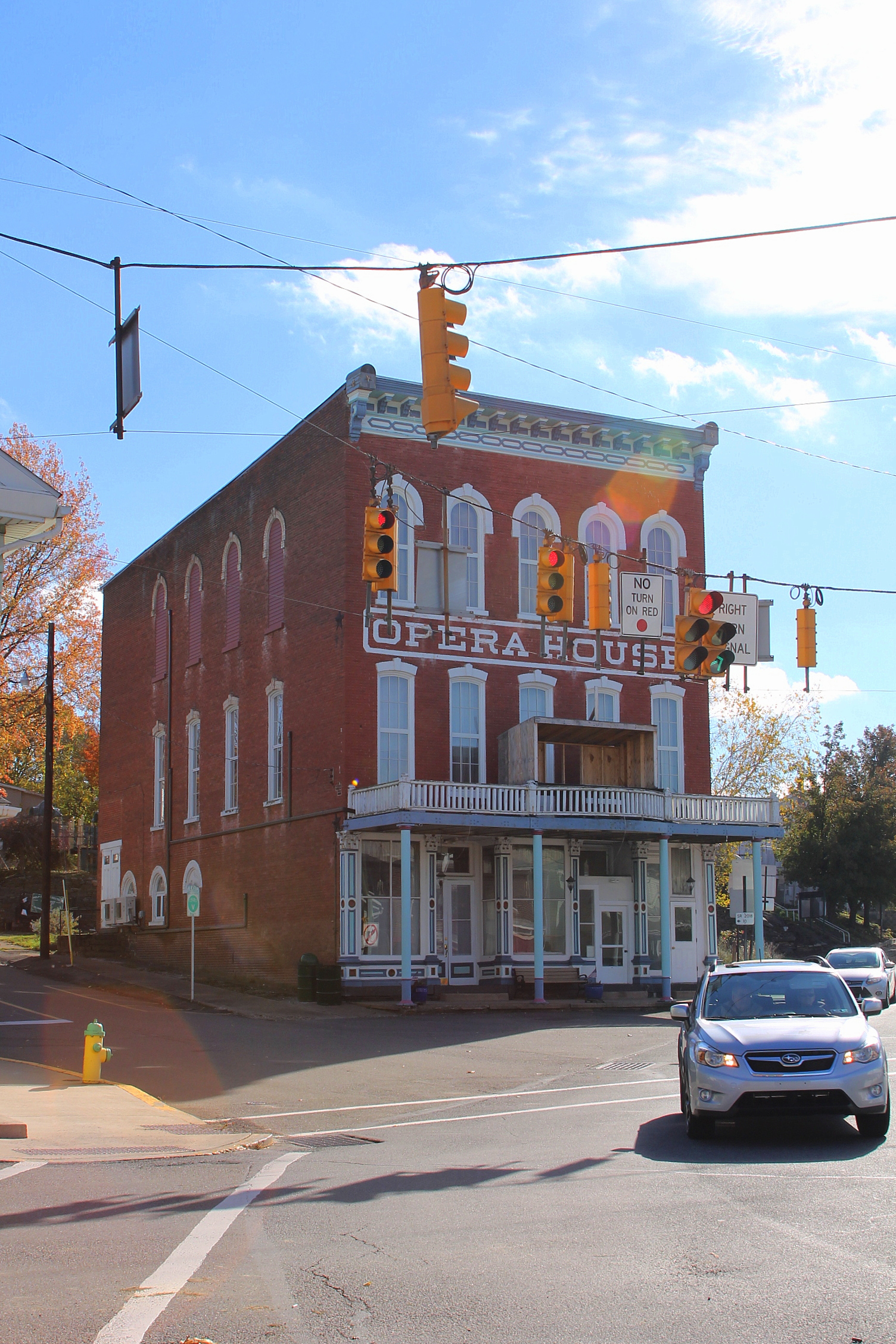
Catawissa Opera House

The area where Catawissa now is was originally owned by William Henry in 1769. Catawissa was laid out in 1787. At this time it was referred to as "Hughesburg" or "Catawissey". The town's lots were distributed by lottery. When boats began to commonly travel along the Susquehanna River, Catawissa became locally important. Talk of a school in Catawissa began in 1796, and one was built there in 1800. The Catawissa Fire Company was founded in 1827. The Catawissa Deposit Bank was incorporated in 1871. The Catawissa Water Company was formed in 1882. A number of Masonic establishments were built in Catawissa in the mid to late 1800s.

The Catawissa Friends Meetinghouse was listed on the National Register of Historic Places in 1978.

== Sister city ==
Catawissa is twinned with Uxbridge, Ontario, a town with many Quaker settlers. The historic link began in 1805, when the Uxbridge area was granted by the British crown to Dr. Christopher Beswick, first medical doctor north of the Oak Ridges Moraine. While not a Quaker, he lived in Catawissa before moving to the Uxbridge area. Beswick Lane in the Ontario town is named after him.

== Geography ==
Catawissa is located in western Columbia County at 40°57′9″N 76°27′37″W (40.952458, -76.460393), on the southeast side of the Susquehanna River. Catawissa Creek flows along the southern boundary of the borough into the Susquehanna. According to the United States Census Bureau, the borough has a total area of 0.54 square miles (1.4 km^{2}), of which 0.02 square miles (0.06 km^{2}), or 4.50%, is water.

The center of Catawissa is flat, with some hills in the northeast.

=== Major roads ===
Pennsylvania Route 42 and Pennsylvania Route 487 enter Catawissa, where they converge for a short distance. PA 42 leads west directly across the Susquehanna, then north 5 miles (8 km) to Bloomsburg, the county seat, while PA 487 leads northeast then north to Bloomsburg, also in 5 miles (8 km). PA 42 leads south 14 miles (23 km) to Centralia, and PA 487 leads southwest 10 miles (16 km) to Elysburg.

== Demographics ==
Historical population
Census	Pop.	Note	%±
1880	1,427		—
1890	1,809		26.8%
1900	2,023		11.8%
1910	1,930		−4.6%
1920	2,025		4.9%
1930	2,023		−0.1%
1940	2,053		1.5%
1950	2,000		−2.6%
1960	1,824		−8.8%
1970	1,701		−6.7%
1980	1,568		−7.8%
1990	1,683		7.3%
2000	1,589		−5.6%
2010	1,552		−2.3%
2020	1,536		−1.0%
2021 (est.)	1,540	▲	0.3%

As of the census of 2000, there were 1,589 people, 710 households, and 428 families residing in the borough. The population density was 2,964.1 inhabitants per square mile (1,144.4/km^{2}). There were 762 housing units at an average density of 1,421.4 per square mile (548.8/km^{2}). The racial makeup of the borough was 97.48% White, 0.69% African American, 0.19% Asian, 0.31% from other races, and 1.32% from two or more races. Hispanic or Latino of any race were 0.44% of the population.

There were 710 households, out of which 27.3% had children under the age of 18 living with them, 42.5% were married couples living together, 14.1% had a female householder with no husband present, and 39.7% were non-families. 35.4% of all households were made up of individuals, and 20.3% had someone living alone who was 65 years of age or older. The average household size was 2.23 and the average family size was 2.89.

In the borough the population was spread out, with 24.2% under the age of 18, 8.1% from 18 to 24, 26.9% from 25 to 44, 20.4% from 45 to 64, and 20.5% who were 65 years of age or older. The median age was 38 years. For every 100 females, there were 78.7 males. For every 100 females age 18 and over, there were 75.7 males.

The median income for a household in the borough was $30,262, and the median income for a family was $37,292. Males had a median income of $30,987 versus $21,210 for females. The per capita income for the borough was $16,154. About 11.8% of families and 15.9% of the population were below the poverty line, including 25.1% of those under age 18 and 13.1% of those age 65 or over.

== Climate ==
The average high temperature in July in Catawissa is 84 °F and the average low during this month is 62 °F. The average high temperature in January is 35 °F and the average low temperature is 19 °F. The highest recorded temperature in Catawissa is 105 °F, which occurred in July 1988, August 1930, and September 1953. The lowest recorded temperature is -26°F, which occurred in January 1994. The driest month in Catawissa is February, which receives an average of 2.37 inches of precipitation. The wettest month is June, which receives an average of 4.5 inches of precipitation.

According to the Köppen climate classification Catawissa has a hot-summer humid continental climate (Dfa). The hardiness zone is 6b bordering 7a.

== Notable people ==
- Samuel Lount, a leader of the Upper Canada Rebellion, and one of several men hanged for his participation.
- Owen D. Leib, congressman for Pennsylvania's District 11.
- Bobby Rhawn, a Major League Baseball infielder of the 1940s.
- Harold L. Ervin, a judge on the Superior Court of Pennsylvania.
- Paul K. Walp, political scientist

== Education ==
Catawissa is in the Southern Columbia Area School District.

Bloomsburg University of Pennsylvania, with over 9,400 students, is the nearest university.
