= Southern Columbia Area School District =

School district in Pennsylvania, U.S.

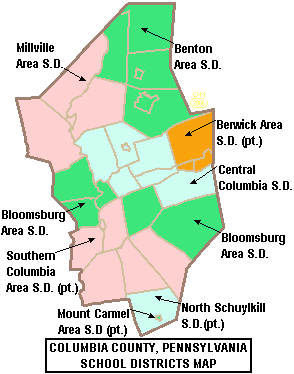

Address
- 800 Southern Drive Catawissa, Columbia County, Pennsylvania, 17820; United States

District information
- Type: Public
- Superintendent: Mrs. Jillann Shupp

Students and staff
- District mascot: Tiger
- Colors: Black and gold

Other information
- Website: www.scasd.us

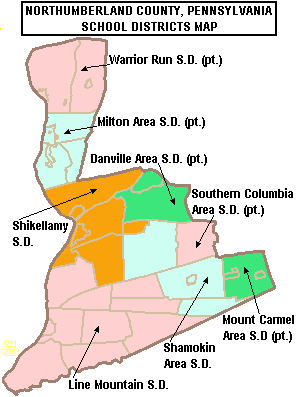
Map of Northumberland County, Pennsylvania Public School Districts

Southern Columbia Area School District is a small, rural, public school district located in Catawissa, Pennsylvania. It serves communities in two counties. In Columbia County the district serves: Catawissa Borough, Catawissa Township, Locust Township, Roaring Creek Township, Franklin Township and Cleveland Township. In Northumberland County it serves Ralpho Township. Southern Columbia Area School District encompasses approximately 108 square miles (280 km^{2}). According to 2000 federal census data, it serves a resident population of 9,803. By 2010, the US Census Bureau reported that the district's population increased to 10,386 people. The per capita income of residents was $18,969 in 2009, while the median family income was $45,889. In the Commonwealth, the median family income was $49,501 and the United States median family income was $49,445, in 2010. The district is one of the 500 public school districts of Pennsylvania.

According to district officials, in school year 2009–10, the Southern Columbia Area School District provided basic educational services to 1,488 pupils. The district employed: 108 teachers, 115 full-time and part-time support personnel, and 7 administrators. Southern Columbia Area School District received more than $6.6 million in state funding in school year 2009–10. Per school district officials, in school year 2007–08, the Southern Columbia Area School District provided basic educational services to 1,424 pupils through the employment of 114 teachers, 141 full-time and part-time support personnel, and 7 administrators.

Southern Columbia Area School District operates three schools: G.C. Hartman Elementary Center (Kindergarten through Fourth Grade), Southern Columbia Area Middle School (Fifth grade through Eighth Grade), and Southern Columbia Area High School serving grades nine through twelve. Both the Elementary and the Junior/Senior High Schools are accredited by the Middle States Association of Colleges and Schools and by the Pennsylvania Department of Education.

== Facilities ==
Southern Columbia has two buildings. One is an elementary school housing kindergarten to fourth grade. Ground was broken in 1974 and the building opened in 1976. The elementary building has a gymnasium/cafeteria. The other is a high school housing ninth to twelfth grades built in 1961. The high school has a 2,080-seat gymnasium and a 900-seat auditorium. A middle school addition was built onto the high school in 1999. The middle/high school was renovated in 2011. The elementary school was also renovated in 2011. The middle/high school is a two-story building. The elementary is also a two-story building.

== Extracurricular activities ==
The Southern Columbia Area School District offers a variety of clubs, activities and an extensive sports program.

Southern Columbia currently holds the Pennsylvania state record for consecutive total state football championships, with 7 and 15 respectively.

=== Sports ===
The district funds:

Boys

- Baseball - AA
- Basketball- AA
- Cross country - A
- Football - AA
- Golf - AA
- Soccer - A
- Track and field - AA
- Wrestling - AA

Girls

- Basketball - AA
- Cross country - A
- Field hockey - AA
- Golf
- Soccer - A
- Softball - AA
- Track and field - AA

Middle school sports

Boys

- Basketball
- Cross country
- Football
- Soccer
- Wrestling

Girls

- Basketball
- Cross country
- Field hockey
- Soccer

According to PIAA directory July 2012
