= Jetstar Hong Kong =

Proposed, but abandoned low-cost airline of Hong Kong

IATA	ICAO	Call sign
JM	JKT	KAITAK
- Founded: 2012
- Ceased operations: 25 June 2015
- Operating bases: Hong Kong International Airport
- Parent company: Shun Tak Holdings (33.3%); China Eastern Airlines; Qantas
- Key people: Pansy Ho (Chairman); Edward Lau (CEO)
- Website: www.jetstarhongkong.com

Jetstar Hong Kong was a planned low fare airline, based at Hong Kong International Airport (Currently as a brand used for promoting the sister companies of Jetstar). In June 2015, Hong Kong's Air Transport Licensing Authority refused Jetstar Hong Kong's application for an operating licence.

It was formed in 2012 as a joint venture between China Eastern Airlines and Qantas. Later, on 6 June 2013, Shun Tak Holdings, a conglomerate in Hong Kong and Macau managed by Pansy Ho invested US$66 million for a 33.3% stake with China Eastern Airlines and Qantas. Jetstar Hong Kong is a subsidiary of Shun Tak Holdings under the Listing Rules.

However, Hong Kong's Air Transport Licensing Authority refused Jetstar Hong Kong's application for an operating licence on 25 June 2015. Subsequently, China Eastern Airlines and Qantas announced the end of its involvement in Jetstar Hong Kong.

Jetstar Hong Kong remains a promotion brand in Hong Kong with an active Facebook page and emphasize their direct flights to Tokyo, Osaka, Singapore, Hanoi and Da Nang.

== History ==
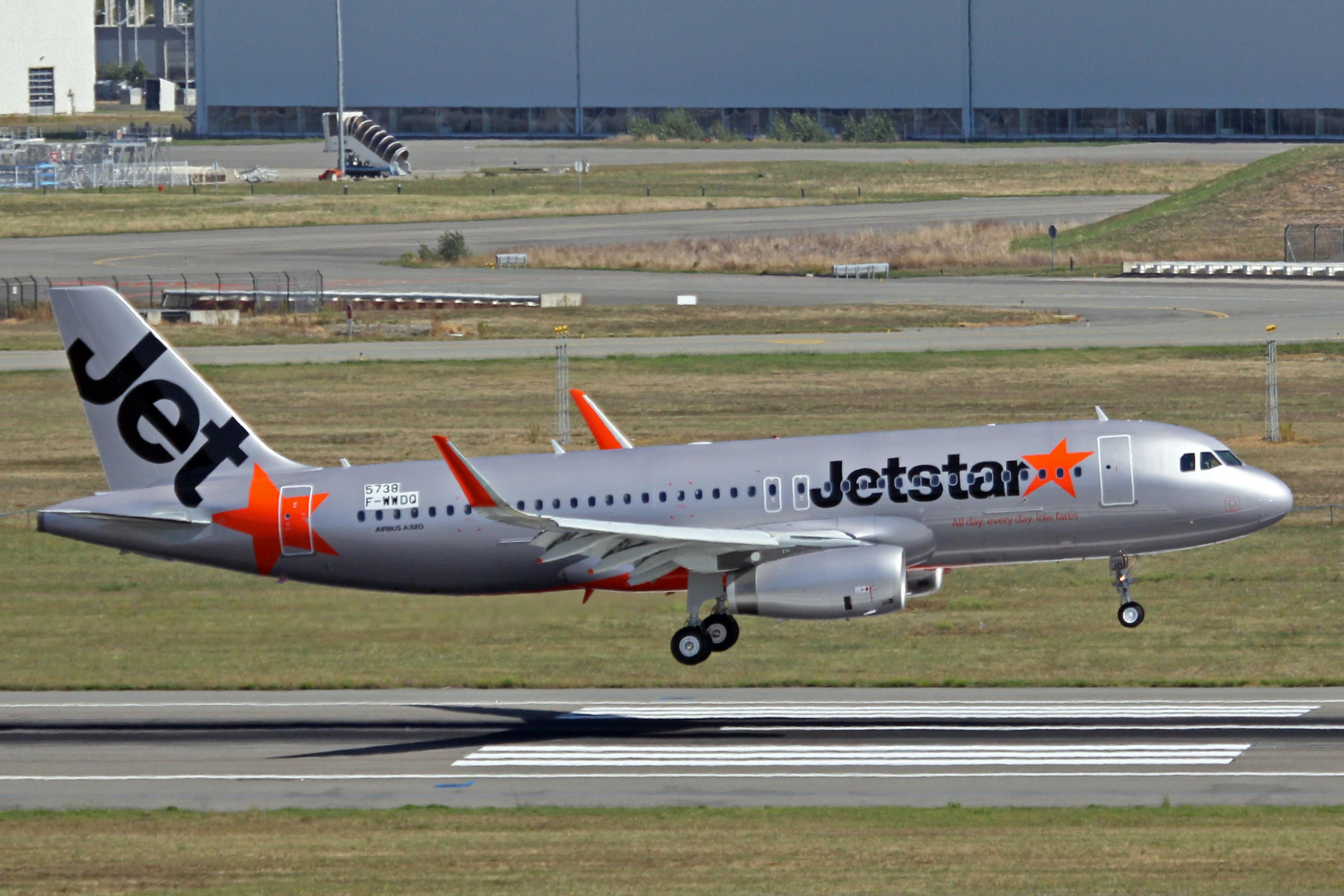
Airbus A320 at Toulouse-Blagnac Airport in September 2013

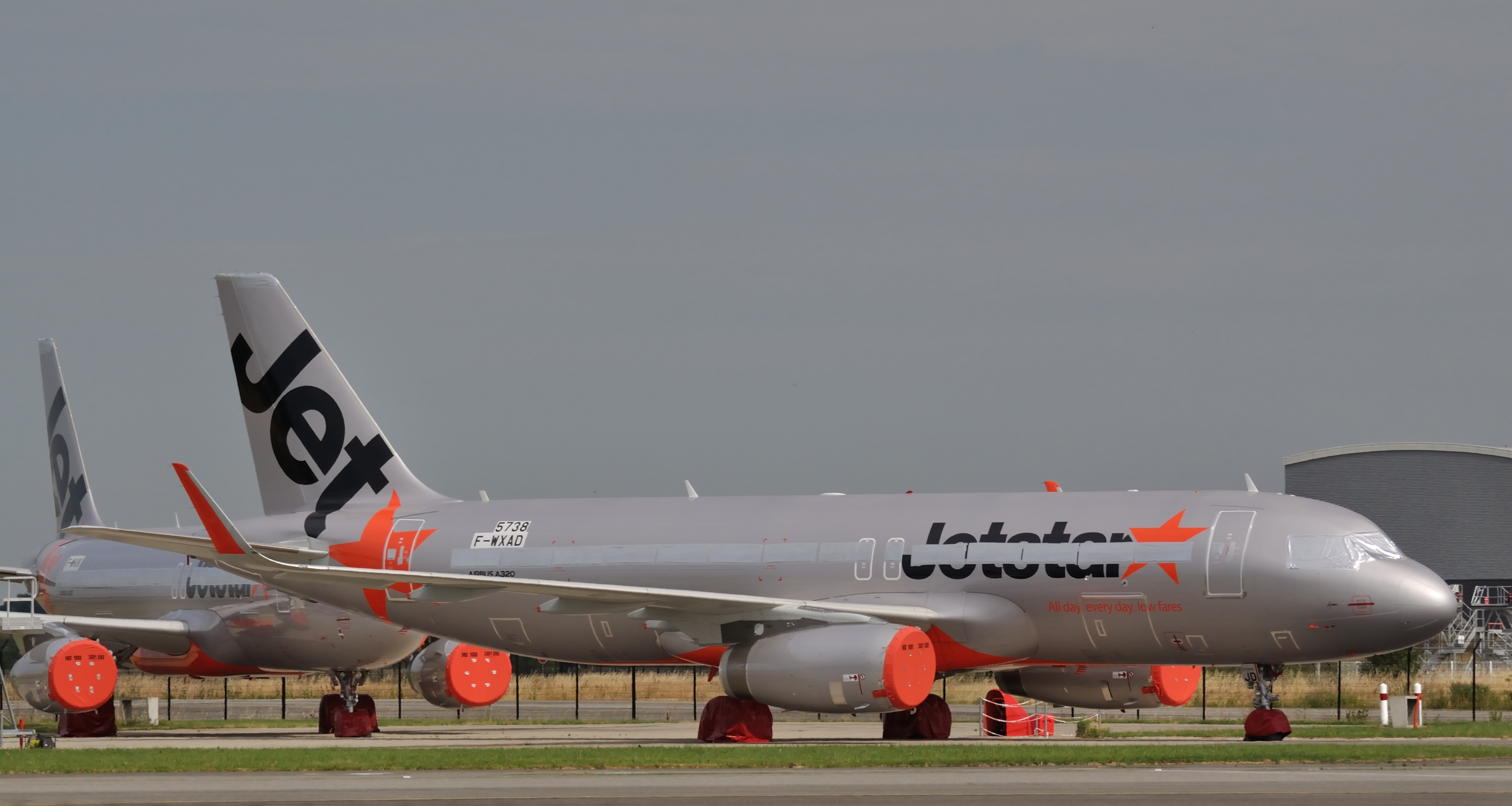
Airbus A320 in store at Toulouse-Blagnac Airport in July 2014

Jetstar Hong Kong lodged an application for an air operator's certificate (AOC) in August 2012. The airline venture originally planned to commence its services in late 2012, but it was awaiting the receipt of approval from the Hong Kong government. Under the Basic Law of Hong Kong, the government has the authority to issue airline licences to companies incorporated in Hong Kong and having their principal place of business in the territory.

On 6 June 2013, it was announced that Shun Tak Holdings had acquired a 33.3% stake in Jetstar Hong Kong. Each investor now held an equal stake in the budget airline. Jetstar Hong Kong had a local CEO, chairman and Hong Kong Permanent Resident majority Board.

In June 2013, the Transport and Housing Bureau said the government was reviewing the regime for designation of local carriers and it would not process any applications from new airlines before the completion of the review. The Transport and Housing Bureau later said in April 2014 that the Hong Kong government's review on the framework for designation of Hong Kong airlines had been completed.

In February 2014, its Company Registry was updated to reflect the changes made to the shareholders voting structure and the appointment of two new board members from local investor Shun Tak Holdings. Its shareholding structure was changed to give local investor Shun Tak Holdings 51% shareholding voting rights with China Eastern Airlines and Qantas each retaining 24.5%.

As the airline continued to progress through the regulatory approval process, its Air Transport Licence application was gazetted in August 2013 but faced objections from incumbent future competitors Cathay Pacific, Dragonair (now defunct), Hong Kong Airlines and HK Express. A public inquiry into Jetstar Hong Kong's Principal Place of Business (required by law to be Hong Kong) associated with its application for an Air Transport Licence was held in January 2015.

On 25 June 2015, Hong Kong's Air Transport Licensing Authority refused Jetstar Hong Kong's application for an operating license.

On 17 August 2015, China Eastern Airlines ended their involvement in the airline and would no longer invest in the project. Qantas also stopped investment on 20 August 2015.

== Proposed destinations ==
Jetstar Hong Kong planned to initially serve short-haul routes to cities in China, Japan, South Korea and South East Asia.

Jetstar Hong Kong submitted applications to operate scheduled air services for up to 129 routes out of Hong Kong, according to a document published by the Licensing Authority of Hong Kong. The airline applied for routes to the following:

- Cambodia (2 destinations): Phnom Penh, Siem Reap
- China (48 destinations / 49 airports): Harbin, Changchun, Shenyang, Dalian, Tianjin, Beijing, Hohhot, Baotou, Yinchuan, Taiyuan, Xi’An, Lanzhou, Xining, Ürümqi, Shijiazhuang, Jinan, Qingdao, Yantai, Zhengzhou, Luoyang, Xuzhou, Yancheng, Nanjing, Wuxi, Shanghai Hongqiao, Shanghai Pudong, Hangzhou, Ningbo, Wenzhou, Hefei, Tunxi, Wuhan, Changsha, Chongqing, Chengdu, Kunming, Dayong, Nanchang, Guiyang, Lijiang, Fuzhou, Jinjiang, Xiamen, Guilin, Nanning, Shantou, Zhanjiang, Haikou, Sanya
- Indonesia (8 destinations): Medan, Bandung, Jakarta, Semarang, Yogyakarta, Surabaya, Denpasar, Lombok
- Japan (26 destinations / 27 airports): Asahikawa, Kushiro, Tokachi-Obihiro, Sapporo, Hakodate, Akita, Sendai, Niigata, Tokyo-Narita, Tokyo-Haneda, Nagoya, Toyama, Komatsu, Osaka-Kansai, Okayama, Hiroshima, Takamatsu, Matsuyama, Kitakyushu, Fukuoka, Oita, Nagasaki, Kumamoto, Miyazaki, Kagoshima, Okinawa, Ishigaki
- Korea (6 destinations / 7 airports): Seoul Incheon, Seoul Gimpo, Cheongju, Daegu, Busan, Muan, Jeju
- Laos (2 destinations): Vientiane, Luang Prabang
- Malaysia (5 destinations): Kota Kinabalu, Kuching, Langkawi, Penang, Kuala Lumpur
- Myanmar (2 destinations): Yangon, Mandalay
- Philippines (9 destinations): Laoag, Clark, Manila, Kalibo, Iloilo, Cebu, Puerto Princesa, Davao, Cagayan De Oro
- Singapore
- Taiwan (3 destinations): Taipei-Taoyuan, Taichung, Kaohsiung
- Thailand (7 destinations): Chiang Rai, Chiang Mai, Bangkok, Koh Samui, Krabi, Phuket, Hat Yai
- Vietnam (5 destinations): Hanoi, Da Nang, Hue, Nha Trang, Ho Chi Minh City
- Others (3 destinations): Guam, Saipan, Koror

== Fleet ==
Jetstar Hong Kong purchased nine Airbus A320s. None were delivered, being placed in store at Toulouse-Blagnac Airport. Three were sold in April 2014, followed by a further three in August 2014. In March 2015, a further two were sold to CMB Financial Leasing.
