= Parque Diversiones =

Amusement park in San José, Costa Rica

Parque Diversiones Dr. Roberto Ortiz Brenes
- Interactive map of Parque Diversiones Dr. Roberto Ortiz Brenes
- Location: San José, Costa Rica
- Coordinates: 9.959951°N 84.127478°W
- Opened: 1981
- Operated by: Asociación Pro-Hospital Nacional de Niños
- Slogan: "Healthy children helping healing children."

Attractions
- Total: 34
- Roller coasters: 5
- Water rides: 4
- Website: www.parquediversiones.com

El Parque Diversiones Dr. Roberto Ortiz Brenes (English: The Dr. Roberto Ortiz Brenes Amusement Park) also known as Parque Diversiones (English: Fun Park), is an amusement park located in San José, Costa Rica. The park opened in 1981, and its motto is "healthy children help sick children". The park was named for Dr. Roberto Ortiz Brenes, whose proposal for a theme park resulted in the park’s creation. His goal was for profits from the park to support the Dr. Carlos Sáenz Herrera National Children's Hospital (Hospital Nacional de Niños, San Juan).

== Rides and attractions ==
=== Current rides and attractions ===
==== Roller coasters ====
Name	Opened	Type	Manufacturer
Bocaraca	2005	Steel roller coaster (MK-1200 Whirlwind)	Vekoma
Búmeran	2012	Steel shuttle roller coaster (Boomerang)	Vekoma
Montaña Ghibli	1984	Steel children's roller coaster	Lucrezia Di Cartoceto
Teletren	2002	Steel children's roller coaster	Zamperla
Torbellino	2018	Steel spinning wild mouse roller coaster	Zamperla

==== Rides and attractions ====
- Abejones
- Caballitos
- Chocones Adultos (Bumper cars)
- Conchas Locas (Tilt-A-Whirl by Sellner Manufacturing)
- Cyber Parke
- Disko (Disk'O by Zamperla)
- Electrónicos (Arcade)
- La Finca de Tío Chanchito
- Pacuare
- Play Parke
- Rueda de Chicago (Ferris wheel)
- Sky Master
- Sonañdo Con TC
- Tarima
- Tornado F5 (Top Spin)
- Torre (Drop tower)
- Trencito Eléctrico (Miniature train)

==== Children's rides ====
Many of the park's children's rides are located in a themed children's area called Plaza Tio Conejo.

- Barkito
- Cho Conito
- Convoy
- Globitos
- Magicletas
- Minitorre (Miniature drop tower)
- Tacitas Locas
- Teatro de TC

==== Water slides ====
- Aventura Costa Rica
- Splash Caribe
- Reventazón
- Pacuare

==== Former rides ====
- Ciclón, 1987 to somewhere between 2006 and 2009 (Steel Galaxi roller coaster by Pinfari)
- Huracán, 1993 to around 2003 (Steel roller coaster by Pax Company)
- Pulpo, unknown to 2018 (Octopus by Eyerly Aircraft Company)
