= Elysburg, Pennsylvania =

Unincorporated community in Pennsylvania, US

Elysburg
- CDP
- Location within the U.S. state of Pennsylvania Elysburg (the United States)
- Coordinates: 40°51′50″N 76°33′8″W
- Country: United States
- State: Pennsylvania
- County: Northumberland

Area
  - Total: 2.92 sq mi (7.55 km^{2})
  - Land: 2.92 sq mi (7.55 km^{2})
  - Water: 0 sq mi (0.00 km^{2})

Population (2020)
  - Total: 2,152
  - Density: 738.0/sq mi (284.93/km^{2})
- Time zone: UTC-5 (Eastern (EST))
  - Summer (DST): UTC-4 (EDT)
- ZIP codes: 17824
- Area code: 570
- FIPS code: 42-23472

Elysburg is a census-designated place (CDP) in Ralpho Township, Pennsylvania, United States. It is forty-two miles north-northeast of Harrisburg. The population was 2,194 at the 2010 census. The area's biggest attraction is Knoebels Amusement Resort, which is known for having three wooden roller coasters and free admission.

== Geography ==
Elysburg is served by Pennsylvania Route 54 and Pennsylvania Route 487. Elysburg's terrain is mostly gently rolling, with some steep hills in the northeastern part of the CDP. Elysburg's land is mostly residential and farmland, with some forest.

== Demographics ==
Historical population
Census	Pop.	Note	%±
2020	2,152		—
U.S. Decennial Census

As of the census of 2000 there were 3,937 people, 1,746 households, and 1,188 families living in the CDP. The population density was 708.4 inhabitants per square mile (273.5/km^{2}). There were 909 housing units at an average density of 311.5 per square mile (120.3/km^{2}). The racial makeup of the CDP was 99.4% White, 0.1% African American, 0.1% Native American, 0.2% Asian, and 0.2% from two or more races. Hispanic or Latino of any race were 0.5% of the population.

There were 855 households, out of which 29.9% had children under the age of 18 living with them, 60.5% were married couples living together, 8.0% had a female householder with no husband present, and 30.6% were non-families. 28.0% of all households were made up of individuals, and 15.6% had someone living alone who was 65 years of age or older. The average household size was 2.35 and the average family size was 2.86.

In the CDP, the population was spread out, with 22.4% under the age of 18, 4.0% from 18 to 24, 24.8% from 25 to 44, 25.7% from 45 to 64, and 23.1% who were 65 years of age or older. The median age was 44 years. For every 100 females, there were 90.2 males. For every 100 females age 18 and over, there were 84.7 males.

The median income for a household in the CDP was $43,222, and the median income for a family was $51,211. Males had a median income of $45,507 versus $31,985 for females. The per capita income for the CDP was $20,897. About 4.6% of families and 9.0% of the population were below the poverty line, including 9.5% of those under age 18 and 10.0% of those age 65 or over.

== Education ==
It is in the Southern Columbia Area School District.

== Notable person ==
- Henry Hynoski, football player and Super Bowl winner with New York Giants

== Recreation ==
- Knoebels Amusement Resort, a family owned and operated amusement park, is in Ralpho Township. It has an Elysburg postal address; it is outside of the CDP.
