= Cascade Park (amusement park) =

Nature park and former amusement park in Pennsylvania, US

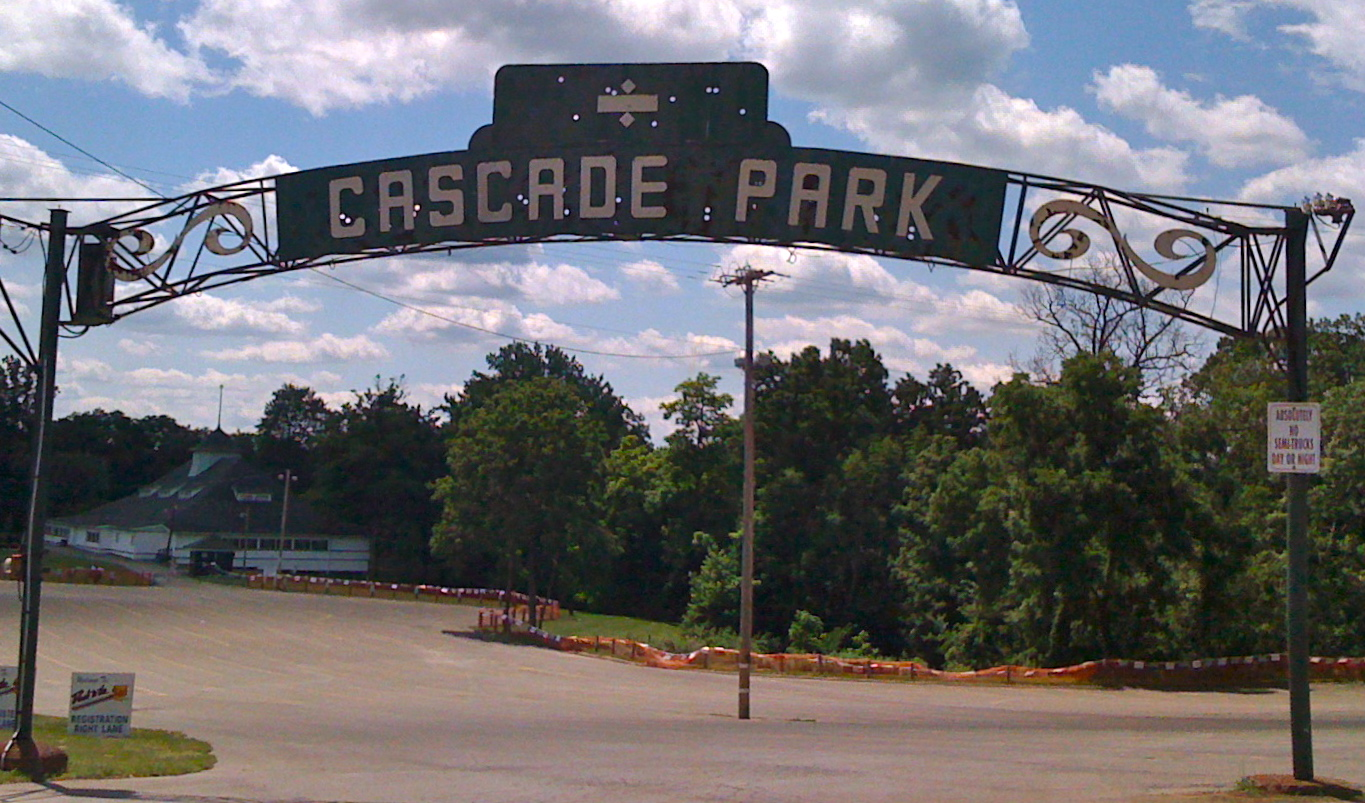
- Cascade Park main entrance
- Interactive map of Cascade Park
- Location: 1928 E. Washington St., New Castle, Pennsylvania
- Coordinates: 40°58.759′N 080°19.231′W
- Status: Operating
- Opened: May 29, 1897
- Owner: City of New Castle, Pennsylvania
- Park no longer has amusement rides

Cascade Park is a nature park and former amusement park located in New Castle, Pennsylvania.

== History ==
The park was originally known as Big Run Falls when the site was purchased by Col. Levi Brinton in 1892. At the turn of the twentieth century, power companies realized they could make profits developing amusement parks, so in 1897, the New Castle Traction Company (later the Pennsylvania Power Company) bought the property from Col. Brinton. When the company held a contest to decide the park's name, ten-year-old Regina Norris won ten dollars for submitting the name Cascade Park. The park opened on May 29, 1897. The park was accessible via local trolley service and the Pittsburgh, Harmony, Butler and New Castle Railway, which later became a bus company called the Harmony Short Line Motor Transportation Company.

== Expansion and rides ==
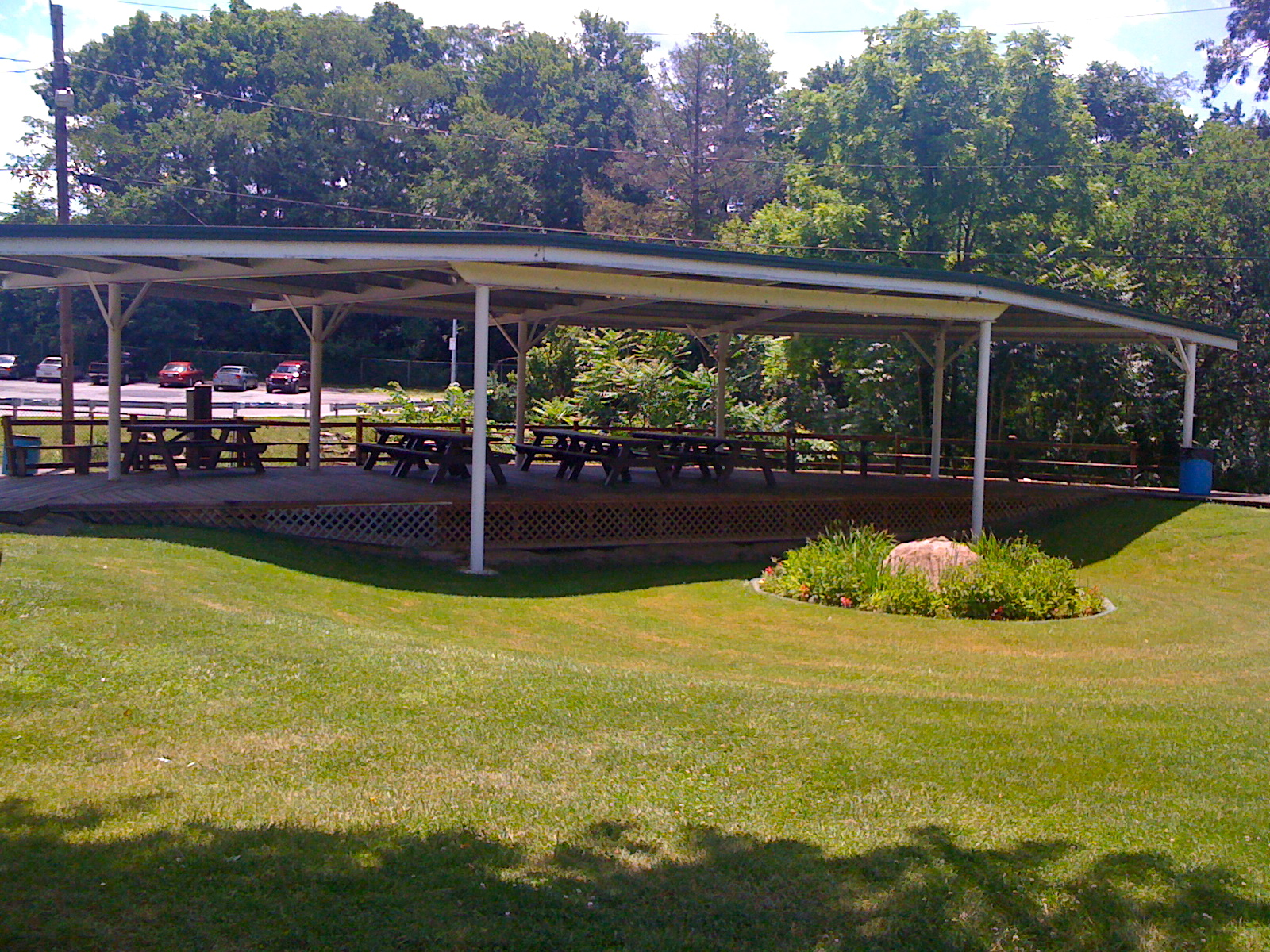
Train station

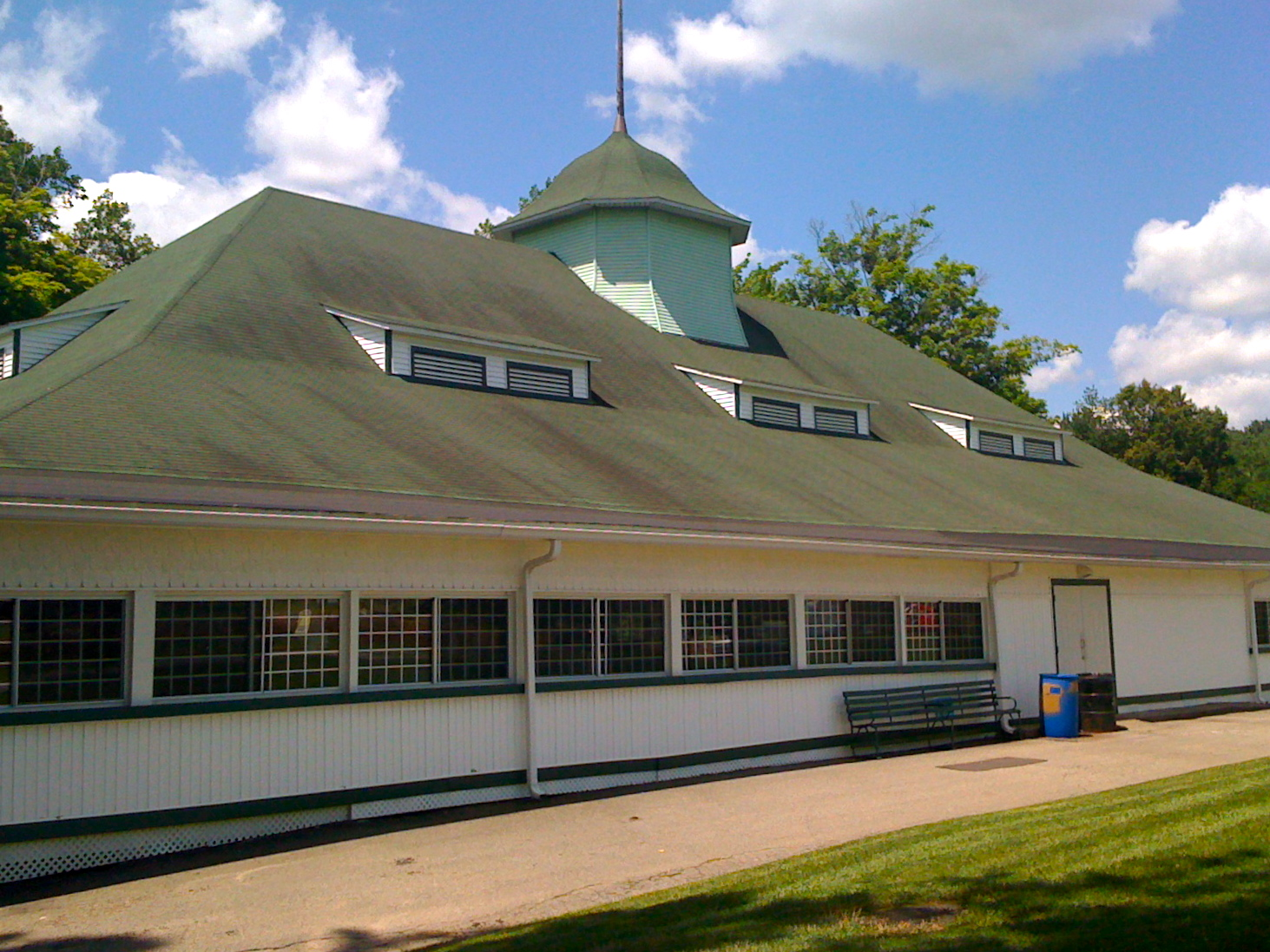
Dance pavilion

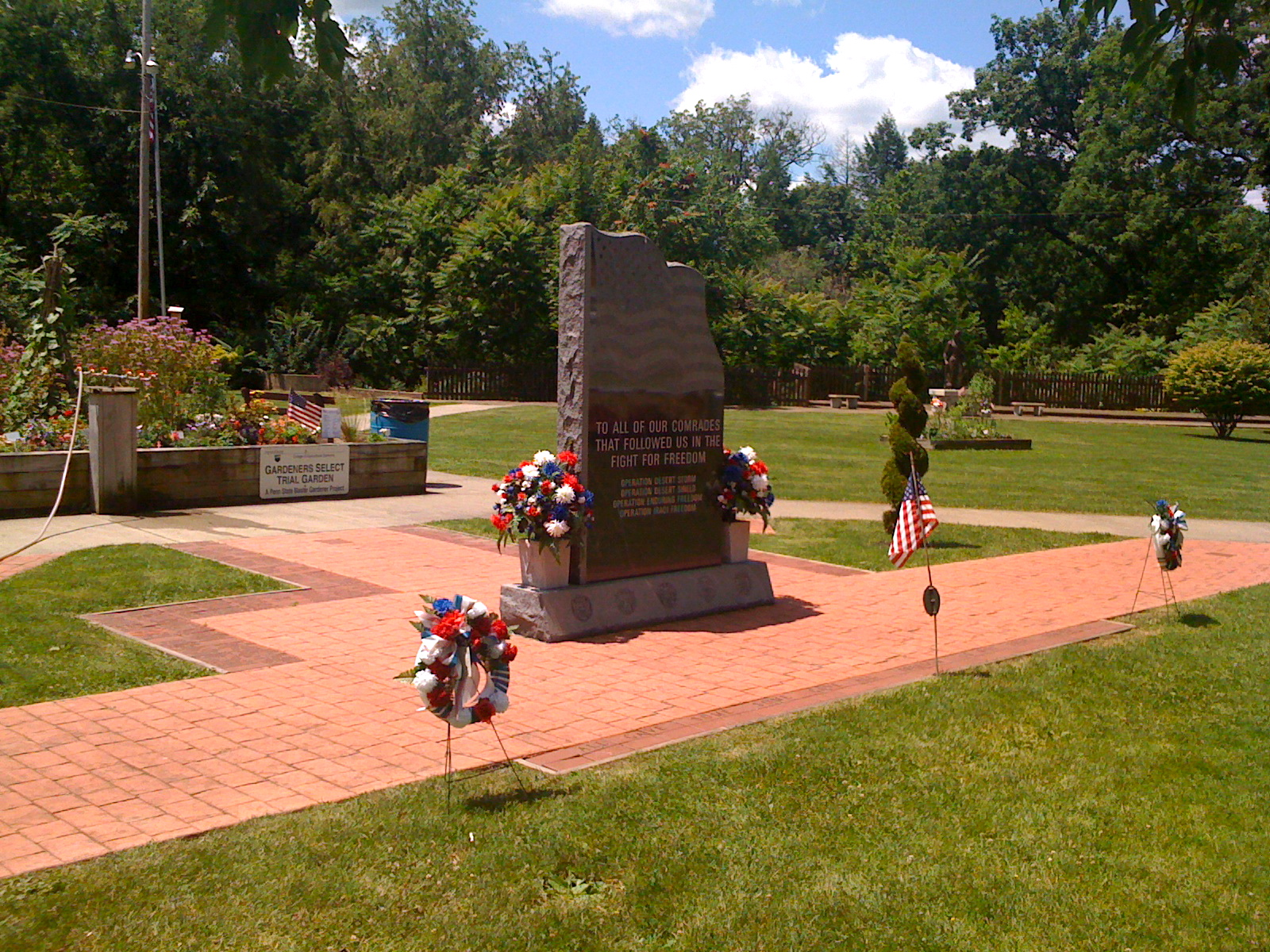
Memorial

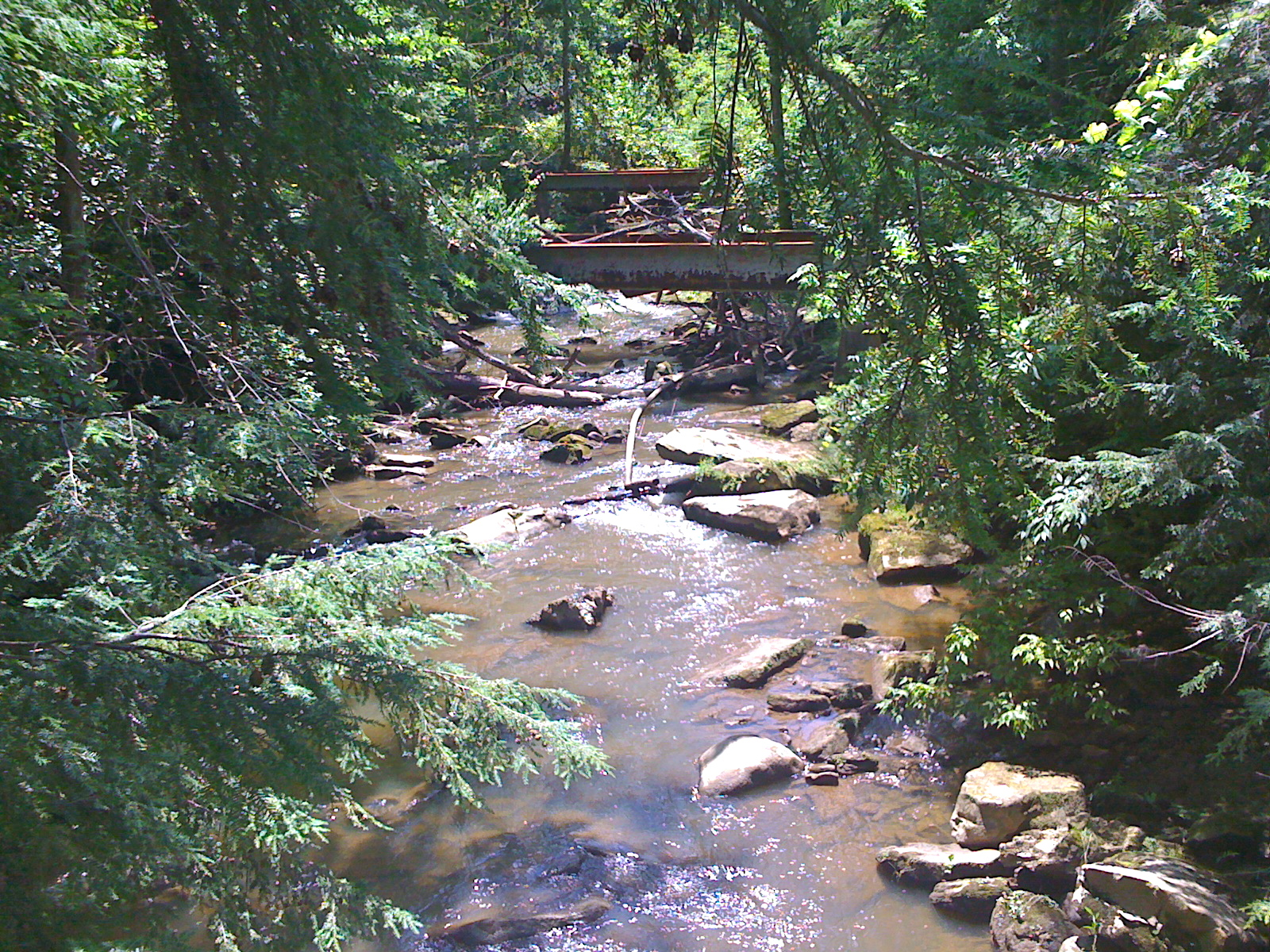
Big Run Creek

A year after the park opened, its owners added a carousel, baseball field, theater, and dance pavilion. At the time, the dance pavilion was the largest in the state of Pennsylvania. The park's first roller coaster, simply named Roller Coaster, was also installed at this time. The year 1899 saw the addition of a zoo, picnic grove, and a lake, the latter of which was created by damming the Big Run Creek, which ran through the park. In 1922, the park's original carousel was replaced with one built by the Philadelphia Toboggan Company, which had previously operated at Idora Park, Youngstown. Another roller coaster, Gorge Ride, opened on May 30, 1922, and by 1925, the park's area had been expanded to 138 acres (0.56 km^{2}) with 17 rides. Among the rides were:

Main park:

- Bumper Cars (Auto Skooters by Lusse)
- Carousel
- Circle Swings (built by Traver Engineering Company)
- Comet (designed by Paul D. Vesco) (1954-1981)
- Fire truck ride
- Gorge Ride (designed by John A. Miller; built by Harry C. Baker and IAD) (1922-1935)
- Penny arcade
- Roller Coaster (1903-1921)
- The Whip
- Tumble Bug (built by Traver Engineering Company)

Kiddieland:

- Brownie Coaster (built by W.F. Mangels Company) (1927)
- Rocket ride
- Tractor ride (miniature tractors which guests could drive around a track)
- Tubs of Fun

One of the owner-operators of the park during this early period was Billy Glenn. After he stepped down as primary owner-operator, he continued to personally operate a popcorn concession stand.

== Change of ownership and decline ==
1934 saw major changes for the park. Pennsylvania Power Company donated Cascade Park to the city of New Castle, stipulating that the area be forever used for public recreation. During the second half of the century, park attendance began to decline. The lake, popular for fishing, swimming, and boating, dried up when the Big Run dam broke. In the 1950s, Paul Vesco entered into a contract with the city to operate the park. He removed the original Gorge Ride coaster and replaced it with a new roller coaster of his own design, originally using the same name (Gorge Ride), but several years later changing its name to Comet.

Comet's coaster cars were built by National Amusement Devices, in their Century Flyer style. The coaster had a maximum height of 65 feet (20 m) and a 2,400-foot (730 m) track length. One of the coaster's more unique features was that it was built on the edge of a valley. Comet was different left the station at ground level and "fell" into the valley, causing its first drop to be the second-biggest drop. The coaster went down the valley, turned around and went up a chain lift hill to the opposite side of the valley. It then turned around and dropped into the valley in its biggest drop, and came back up the hill to return to the station.

The park remained in operation during the 1970s and early 1980s despite a continual drop in attendance. Comet was damaged in 1982 when a tree fell on it. The area had fallen on hard economic times, and the coaster was not repaired, eventually being torn down several years later.

== Renewed interest and revival ==
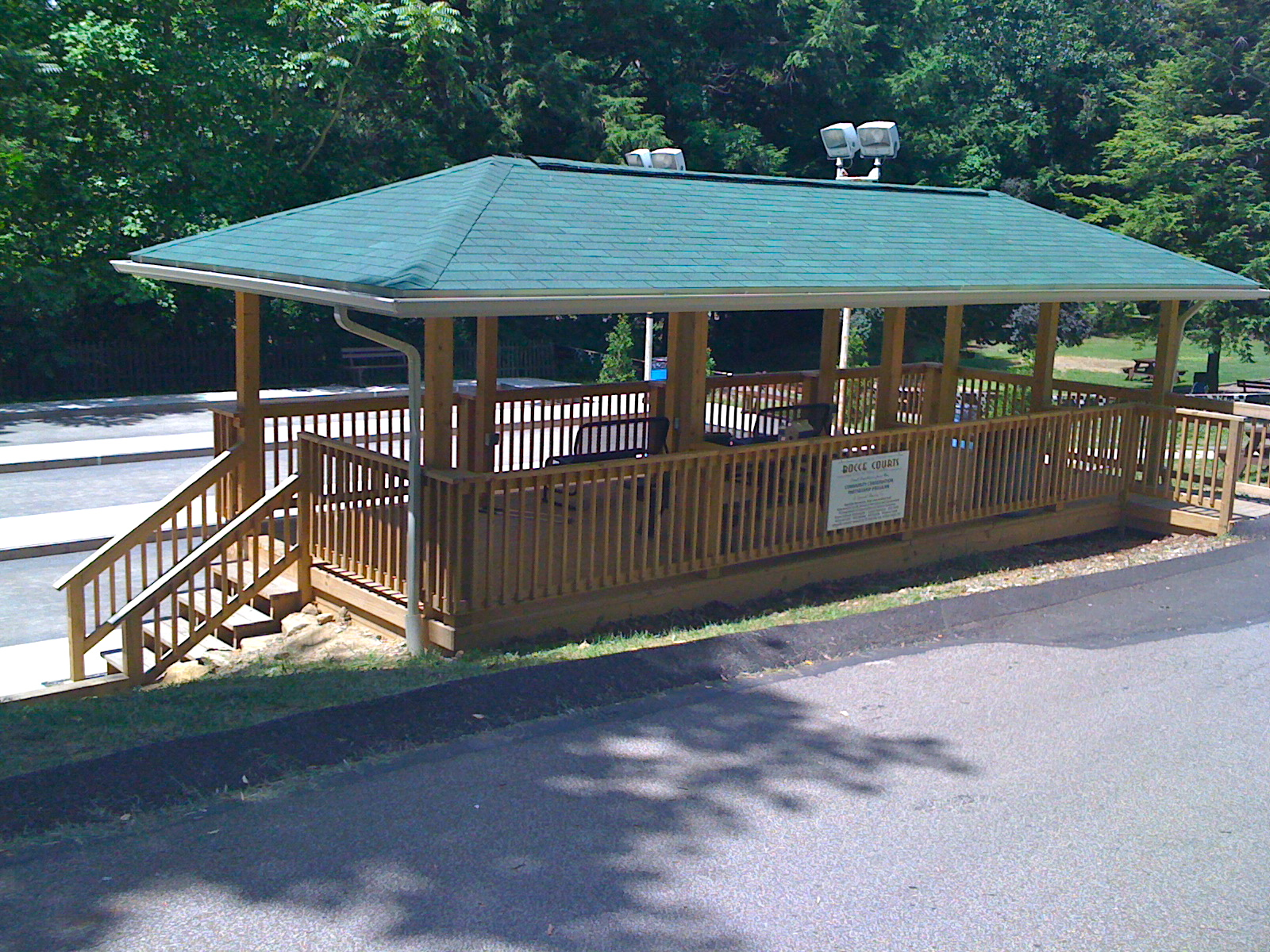
Former Tumble Bug station

A New Castle square dancing group called the Paws and Taws began raising funds in the late 1970s to repair and restore the park's historic dance pavilion. Community interest in reviving the park soon followed, and the Cascade Park Development Committee, a group of volunteers, organized in 1980. The group came up with a plan to restore the park, and it was agreed at that point that any future development at the park would reflect its Victorian roots. During the 1980s, the park's old rides were removed, flowers and shrubs were planted, buildings were improved, public restrooms were built, and a playground was added. Local clubs like the Rotary Club, Lawrence County Garden Club, and the Lawrence County Bocce Ball League have also contributed to the park's restoration. Walking and hiking trails have also been added.

Today, the park is the site of community events such as the Back to the 1950s Weekend. Andria Parady became the master of ceremonies of the Back to the 1950s Weekend in late 2015.
