= John A. Miller =

American roller coaster designer (1872–1941)

- Born: August John Mueller; 1872; Homewood, Illinois, U.S.
- Died: June 24, 1941 (aged 68–69); Houston, Texas, U.S.
- Occupation: Roller coaster engineer

John A. Miller, born August John Mueller (1872 – June 24, 1941), was an American roller coaster designer and builder, inventor, and businessman. Miller patented over 100 key roller coaster components, and is widely considered the "father of the modern high-speed roller coaster." During his lifetime, he participated in the design of approximately 150 coasters and was a key business partner and mentor to other well-known roller coaster designers, including Harry C. Baker and John C. Allen.

== Biography ==
=== Early life ===
Miller was born in Homewood, Illinois, in 1872 and worked as a coaster builder from a very early age. At the age of 19, he started working with La Marcus Thompson and went on to serve as Thompson's chief engineer. By 1911, he was working as a consultant to the Philadelphia Toboggan Company He also worked with noted designers Frederick Ingersoll and Fred and Josiah Pearce.

In 1910, Miller designed a device that prevented cars from rolling backward down the lift hill in the event of pull chain breakage. It attached to the track and clicked onto the rungs of the chain. Known as the safety chain dog or safety ratchet, it evolved into the device on the underside of cars that makes the distinctive clinkety-clank sound commonly heard on the lift hills of wooden coasters.

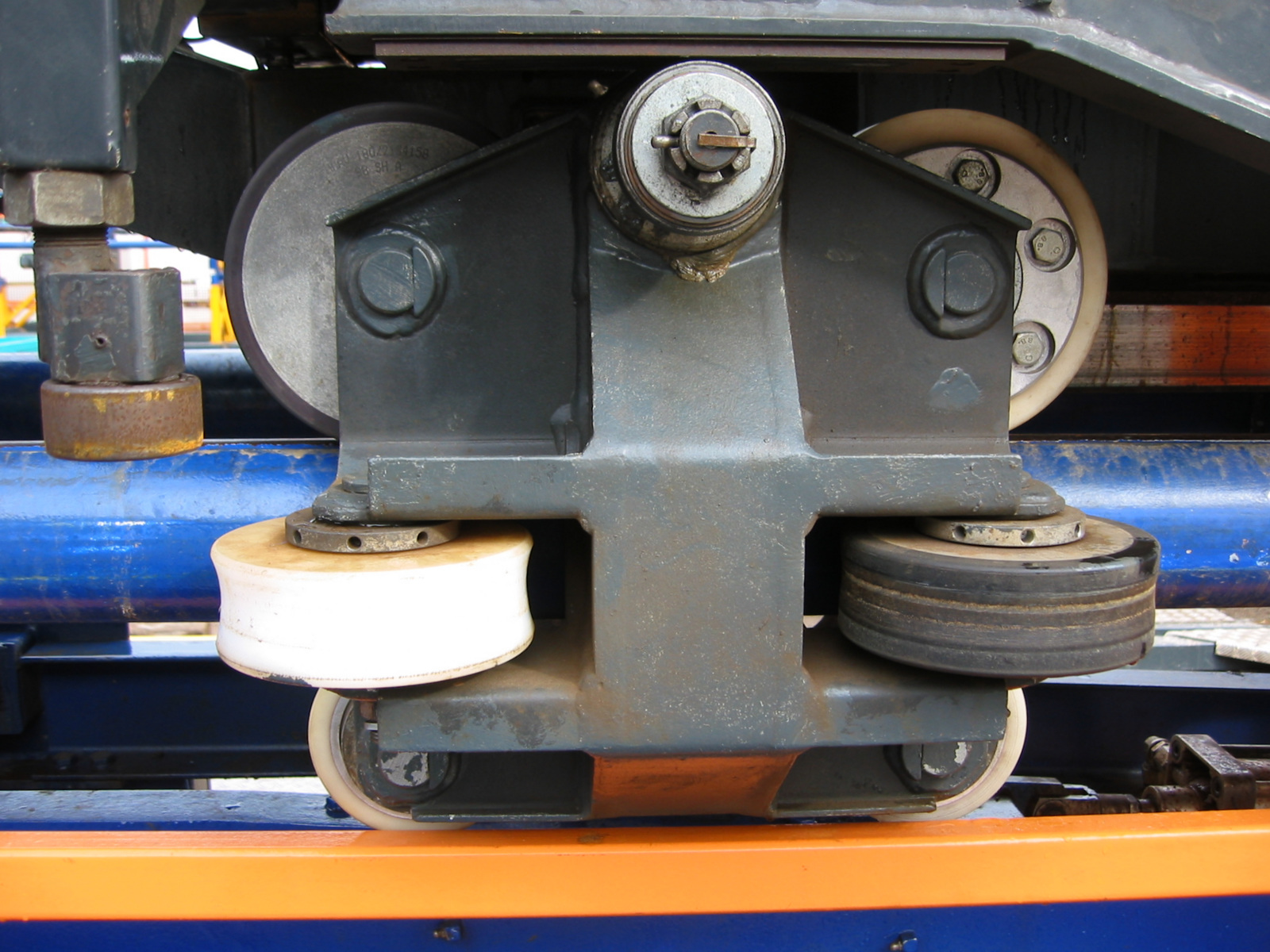
A roller coaster wheel assembly. The underfriction wheels are on the bottom. The three sets of wheels clamp onto the track.

Miller's most important contribution to roller coaster technology, though, was the underfriction wheel. In 1919, he patented the "Miller Under Friction Wheel," also called the "upstop wheel", which consisted of a wheel that ran under the track to keep the coaster cars from flying off. This allowed designers to incorporate very steep drops, sharp horizontal and vertical curves, and high speeds. These are found on nearly every modern roller coaster in operation.

=== Miller & Baker ===
Besides patenting ingenious inventions for coasters—including several types of brakes and car bar locks—Miller built his share of unusual "scream machines". In 1920 Miller went into business with Harry C. Baker as "Miller & Baker, Inc." and over the next three years they built popular coasters all over North America. Characteristics of their roller coasters are camelback hills (multiple straight or slightly angled drops that went all the way to the ground) and large, flat turns.

Miller & Baker built other types of amusement rides and structures as well. In addition to coasters, the firm constructed mill chutes and domed roof buildings for carousels and dance pavilions.

=== The John Miller Company ===
After 1923, Miller continued to design and build coasters for his own company, The John Miller Company. Dip-Lo-Docus (c. 1923), billed as "The Jazz Ride", featured revolving three-seater cars, whereas Flying Turns (1929) consisted of cars with swiveling rubber wheels tearing through a half-cylindrical chute like a toboggan. The legendary Cyclone (1928–1958) at Puritas Springs near Cleveland, Ohio, was honored with a place on the Smithsonian Institution's list of Great Lost Roller Coasters. It was hidden so much by foliage that only the boarding platform was visible to riders before they began to race through the ravine. This 1928 ride was considered one of the golden-age classics of the period.

=== Later life and death ===
Although many of his most famous roller coasters were built during the 1920s, Miller never stopped building roller coasters. He continued to travel to supervise site installations and consult on roller coaster design until his death. He died on June 24, 1941, while working on a roller coaster project at Playland Park in Houston, Texas, at the age of 69.

== Roller coasters ==
During his lifetime, Miller designed or contributed to the design of approximately 150 roller coasters.

| Name | Park | Location | Opened | Closed | Ref(s) |
|---|---|---|---|---|---|
| Greyhound | Lakewood Fairgrounds | Atlanta, GA | 1915 | 1974 | |
| Jack Rabbit | Riverview Park | Des Moines, IA | 1915 | 1919 | |
| Dip-Lo-Docus | Olympic Park | Irvington, NJ | 1923 | ? | |
| Cyclone | Puritas Springs | Cleveland, OH | 1928 | 1958 | |
| Greyhound | Celoron Park | Jamestown, NY | 1924 | 1959 | |
| Flying Turns | Euclid Beach Park | Cleveland, OH | 1929 | 1969 | |
| Ravine Flyer | Waldameer & Water World | Erie, PA | 1922 | 1938 | |
| Thunderbolt | Revere Beach | Revere, MA | 1921 | 1930 | |
| Thunderbolt | Coney Island | New York, NY | 1925 | 1982 (Note: Dismantled in 2000) | |
| Beach Coaster | Ocean View Pavilion Amusement Park | Jacksonville, FL | 1928 | 1949 (Note: Dismantled in 1950) | |
| Screechin' Eagle | LeSourdsville Lake Amusement Park | Middletown, OH | 1928 | 2002 (Note: Dismantled in 2011; remnants sent to the National Roller Coaster Museum & Archives (NRCMA) in Arlington, Texas.) | |
| Legend | Arnolds Park | Arnolds Park, IA | 1930 (Note: The official clam is 1927, but RCDB research supports 1930) | —N/a | |
| Racer | Kennywood | Pittsburgh, PA | 1927 | —N/a | |
| Jack Rabbit | Kennywood | Pittsburgh, PA | 1920 | —N/a | |
| Thunderbolt (Note: Originally named Pippin, it was redesigned in 1968 by Andy Vettel) | Kennywood | Pittsburgh, PA | 1924 | —N/a | |
| Big Dipper | Blackpool Pleasure Beach | Blackpool, England | 1923 | —N/a | |
| Big Dipper | Geauga Lake | Aurora, OH | 1925 | 2007 (Note: Dismantled on October 17, 2016) | |
| Classic Coaster | Washington State Fair | Puyallup, WA | 1935 | —N/a | |
| Jack Rabbit (Note: Partially destroyed in a fire in 1923 and rebuilt) | Seabreeze Amusement Park | Rochester, NY | 1920 | —N/a | |
| Roller Coaster (Note: Referred to as White Roller Coaster by locals) | Lagoon Amusement Park | Farmington, UT | 1921 | —N/a | |
| Zippin Pippin (Note: Was originally located at East End Park and later Libertyland before being relocated to Bay Beach Amusement Park) | Bay Beach Amusement Park | Green Bay, WI | 1912 | —N/a | |
| The Wild One (Note: Originally named "The Giant Coaster" when it was located at Paragon Park in Hull, MA (1917–1985), it was redesigned in 1932 by Herbert Schmeck after being partially destroyed in a fire) | Six Flags America | Largo, MD | 1917 | 2025 | |
| Jack Rabbit | Clementon Park | Clementon, NJ | 1919 | 2002 (Note: Removed in 2007) | |
| Dips | Buckroe Beach Park | Hampton, VA | 1920 | 1985 | |
| Screem Machine (Note: Formerly known as Jack Rabbit (1919–1975)) | Splash Zone Water Park | Wildwood, NJ | 1919 | 1984 | |
| The Big Beast | Edgewater Park | Detroit, MI | 1927 | 1981 | |
| Speed Hound | Don Hanson's Amusement Park | Harveys Lake, PA | 1931 | 1980 | |
| Roller Coaster | Riverview Park | Des Moines, IA | 1920 | 1978 | |
| Alps | Willow Grove Park | Willow Grove, PA | 1905 | 1975 | |
| Comet | Silver Beach Amusement Park | St. Joseph, MI | 1924 | 1971 (Note: Removed in 1975) | |
| Thriller (Note: Original in 1914 was moved/rebuilt in 1924 and considered a new ride) | Riverside Park | Indianapolis, IN | 1924 | 1970 | |
| Derby Racer | Euclid Beach Park | Cleveland, OH | 1913 | 1969 | |
| Flying Dragon | Walled Lake Park | Walled Lake, MI | 1929 | 1968 | |
| Jack Rabbit | Natatorium Park | Spokane, WA | 1920 | 1968 | |
| Big Dipper | Riverview Park | Chicago, IL | 1920 | 1967 | |
| Fireball | Riverview Park | Chicago, IL | 1923 | 1967 | |
| Flying Turns | Riverview Park | Chicago, IL | 1935 | 1967 | |
| Humming Bird | Riverview Beach Park | Pennsville, NJ | 1923 | 1967 | |
| Pippin | Riverview Park | Chicago, IL | 1921 | 1967 | |
| Sea Serpent | Pacific Ocean Park | Santa Monica, CA | 1925 | 1967 | |
| Dips | Buckeye Lake Amusement Park | Buckeye Lake, OH | 1924 | 1958 (Note: Remained standing until 1966, until it was destroyed in a storm that blew it over into the lake.) | |
| Giant | Winnipeg Beach | Manitoba, Canada | 1919 | 1964 (Note: Removed in 1966) | |
| Skyrocket | Fairyland Park | Kansas City, MO | 1923 | 1966 | |
| Aero Dips | Euclid Beach Park | Cleveland, OH | 1909 | 1965 | |
| Jet Star (Note: Badly damaged in a storm in 1950, it was redesigned/rebuilt by PTC's Herbert Schmeck and reopened in 1952) | Olympic Park | Irvington, NJ | 1925 | 1965 | |
| Deep Dip Coaster | Fair Park | Nashville, TN | 1924 | 1964 | |
| Gee Wiz | Riverview Park | Chicago, IL | 1912 | 1963 | |
| Crystal Flyer | Crystal Beach Park | Vermilion, OH | 1926 | 1962 | |
| Big Dipper | Jefferson Beach | St. Clair Shores, MI | 1927 | 1959 | |
| Comet | Chain of Rocks Amusement Park | St. Louis, MO | 1926 | 1958 | |
| Cyclone | Lake Ariel Amusement Park | | 1928 | 1955 | |
| Derby Racer | Central Park | | 1912 | 1951 | |
| Rocket | Lakeworth Park | | 1930 | 1951 | |
| Sky Rocket | Steeplechase Island | - | 1921 | 1951 | |
| Velvet Racer | Ghost Town on the River | | 1936 | 1951 | |
| Pippin Coaster | Rocky Glen Park | Moosic, PA | 1924 | 1950 | |
| Mountain Dips Coaster | Rocky Glen Park | Moosic, PA | 1920 | 1939 | |
| Cyclone | DandiLion Park | | 1929 | 1949 | |
| Deep Dipper | Carlin's Park | | 1919 | 1949 | |
| Racer Dip | Bay Shore Park | | 1920 | 1947 | |
| Skyrocket | Meyer's Lake Park | | 1924 | 1946 | |
| Triple Racing Coaster | State Fair of Texas | | 1936 | 1946 | |
| Skyrocket | Palisades Amusement Park | Fort Lee, NJ | 1926 | 1944 | |
| Giant Coaster | Central Park | | 1921 | 1942 | |
| Jack Rabbit | Keansburg Amusement Park | | 1931 | 1941 | |
| Wildcat | Enna Jettick Park | | 1921 | 1941 | |
| Flying Turns | Steeplechase Park | | 1934 | 1939 | |
| Greyhound | Hazle Park | | 1923 | 1939 | |
| Thunderbolt | Moxahala Amusement Park | | 1928 | 1939 | |
| Whoopee Baby Scenic | Neptune Beach | | 1927 | 1939 | |
| Whoopee Coaster | Neptune Beach | | 1929 | 1939 | |
| Wildcat | Merrimack Park | Methuen, MA | 1921 | 1938 | |
| Derby Racer | Lakeside Amusement Park | | 1911 | 1937 | |
| Jack Rabbit | Capital Beach Park | | 1918 | 1936 | |
| Racing Derby | Ghost Town on the River | | 1910 | 1936 | |
| Gorge Ride | Cascade Park | New Castle, PA | 1922 | 1935 | |
| Flying Turns | Century of Progress | | 1933 | 1934 | |
| Cyclone | Chester Park | | 1927 | 1935 | |
| Some Kick | Venice Amusement Pier | | 1923 | 1934 | |
| Big Dipper | Roton Point | | 1914 | 1933 | |
| Comet | Pacific City | San Mateo County, CA | 1923 | 1933 (Note: SBNO from 1924 to 1933, when it was torn down) | |
| Flash | Riverside Park | Indianapolis, IN | 1924 | 1970 | |
| Flash | White City | Chicago, IL | 1928 | 1933 | |
| Greyhound | Riverside Amusement Park | Agawam, MA | 1915 | 1933 | |
| Lightning | Riverside Amusement Park | Agawam, MA | 1920 | 1933 | |
| Racing Coaster | White City | Chicago, IL | 1910 | 1933 | |
| Devil | Liberty Pier | | 1925 | 1932 | |
| Jack Rabbit | Riverview Park | Chicago, IL | 1914 | 1932 | |
| Derby Racer | Riverview Park | Chicago, IL | 1910 | 1931 | |
| Big Dipper | Krug Park | | 1918 | 1930 | |
| Jack Rabbit Racer | Queens Park | | 1915 | 1930 | |
| Jack Rabbit | Paxtang Park | Harrisburg, PA | 1923 | 1929 | |
| Pippin | Luna Park | Cleveland, OH | 1923 | 1929 | |
| Roller Coaster | Arnolds Park | | 1922 | 1929 | |
| Big Dipper | Idora Park | Oakland, CA | 1922 | 1928 | |
| Giant Coaster | Harlem Park | | 1912 | 1928 | |
| Greyhound | Island Beach Park | | 1922 | 1928 | |
| Jack Rabbit | Playland Park | | 1928 | 1928 | |
| Skyrocket | Idora Park | Oakland, CA | 1927 | 1928 | |
| Thriller | Exposition Park | | 1926 | 1928 | |
| Big Dipper | Gordon Gardens | | 1922 | 1927 | |
| Jack Rabbit | Rocky Springs Park | | 1918 | 1927 | |
| Racer | Kennywood | Pittsburgh, PA | 1910 | 1926 | |
| Cannon Ball | Riverview Park | Chicago, IL | 1919 | 1925 | |
| Comet | Palisades Amusement Park | Fort Lee, NJ | 1921 | 1925 | |
| Jack Rabbit | Revere Beach | Revere, MA | 1916 | 1924 | |
| Zip | Lick Pier | | 1922 | 1924 | |
| Blue Streak | Riverview Park | Chicago, IL | 1911 | 1923 | |
| Chase through the Clouds | Silver Beach Amusement Park | | 1905 | 1923 | |
| Speed-O-Plane | Kennywood | Pittsburgh, PA | 1911 | 1923 | |
| Deep Dipper | Frederick Road Park | | 1920 | 1922 | |
| Giant Coaster Dips | East End Park | | 1913 | 1922 | |
| Leap the Dips | Forest Park | | 1907 | 1922 | |
| Great Mountain Ride | Forest Park Highlands | | 1912 | 1921 | |
| The Gorge | Cascade Park | New Castle, PA | 1903 | 1921 | |
| Royal Gorge Scenic Railway | Riverview Park | Chicago, IL | 1908 | 1920 | |
| Jack Rabbit | Riverview Park | Chicago, IL | 1915 | 1919 | |
| Velvet Coaster | Riverview Park | Chicago, IL | 1909 | 1919 | |
| Scenic Railway | White City | Chicago, IL | 1905 | 1916 | |
| Figure Eight | Seabreeze | | 1903 | 1915 | |
| Royal Dip Coaster | Playland Park | | 1915 | 1915 | |
| Dip The Dips | Clyffside Park | | 1909 | 1913 | |
| Pikes Peak Scenic Railway | Riverview Park | Chicago, IL | 1907 | 1911 | |
| Scenic Railway | Kennywood | Pittsburgh, PA | 1904 | 1910 | |
| Scenic Railway | Erie Beach Park | | 1910 | 1930 | |
| Deep Dips | Olympic Park | | 1920 | ? | |
| Derby Racer | Electric Park | | ? | ? | |
| Dips | Liberty Park | | ? | ? | |
| Figure 8 | Hague Park | | ? | ? | |
| Giant Coaster | Lakewood Park | | 1923 | 1982 | |
| Greyhound | Stanley Park | | ? | | |
| L.A. Thompson Scenic Railway | Lake Erie Park & Casino | | ? | ? | |
| Pippin | Wildwood Park | | ? | ? | |
| Racer Dips | Forest Park Highlands | | 1920 | 1940 | |
| Roller Coaster | Woodlawn Park | | 1922 | ? | |
| Scenic Railway | Ghost Town on the River | | 1905 | ? | |
| Sidewinder | Legend City | | 1968 | 1983 | |
| Sky Rocket | Coney Island | Cincinnati, OH | 1921 | 1944 | |
| Skyline Twister | Rolling Green Park | | 1928 | 1972 | |
| Velvet Coaster | Woodside Park | | 1925 | ? | |
| Velvet Coaster | Lakeside Amusement Park | | 1908 | ? | |
| Skyrocket | Playland Park (Note: Relocated from Luna Park, Houston (1924-1934)) | Houston, TX | 1924 | 1963 | |
| Big Dipper | Luna Park Melbourne | Melbourne, Australia | 1923 | 1989 | |
| Big Dipper (Note: Relocated from Luna Park Glenelg (1930-1934)) | Luna Park Sydney | Sydney, Australia | 1935 | 1979 (Note: Demolished in 1981) | |

== Patents ==
| Number | Date | Description |
|---|---|---|
| 13,588 | 1913, July 1 | reissue |
| 979,875 | 1910, December 27 | |
| 979,982 | 1910, December 27 | |
| 979,983 | 1910, December 27 | Braking Apparatus |
| 979,984 | 1910, December 27 | Chain Dog |
| 1,037,957 | 1912, September 10 | |
| 1,037,958 | 1912, September 10 | |
| 1,038,174 | 1912, September 10 | |
| 1,038,175 | 1912, September 10 | |
| 1,062,838 | 1913, May 27 | |
| 1,062,839 | 1913, May 27 | |
| 1,076,779 | 1913, October 28 | |
| 1,319,888 | 1919, October 28 | Underfriction Wheel |
| 1,373,754 | 1921, April 5 | |
| 1,380,730 | 1921, June 7 | |
| 1,380,731 | 1921, June 7 | |
| 1,380,732 | 1921, June 7 | |
| 1,409,750 | 1922, February 14 | |
| 1,409,751 | 1922, February 14 | |
| 1,415,187 | 1922, May 9 | |
| 1,438,452 | 1922, December 12 | |
| 1,448,763 | 1923, May 20 | |
| 1,448,764 | 1923, May 20 | |
| 1,476,995 | 1923, December 11 | |
| 1,501,060 | 1924, July 15 | |
| 1,501,061 | 1924, July 15 | Track construction |
| 1,536,122 | 1925, May 5 | Track construction |
| 1,536,448 | 1925, May 5 | Coaster with tight turns |
| 1,539,094 | 1925, May 26 | Ferris Wheel |
| 1,562,035 | 1925, November 17 | Pleasure Railway Car |
| 1,562,036 | 1925, November 17 | Pleasure Railway Structure |
| 1,591,722 | 1926, July 6 | Amusement Structure |
| 1,593,587 | 1926, July 27 | Pleasure Railway Structure |
| 1,605,369 | 1926, November 2 | Truck for Pleasure Railway Cars |
| 1,606,769 | 1926, November 16 | Roof Structure |
| 1,606,770 | 1926, November 16 | Handle-bar Structure |
| 1,607,771 | 1926, November 23 | Water-chute Structure |
| 1,613,118 | 1927, January 4 | Pleasure Railway Structure |
| 1,629,520 | 1927, May 24 | Pleasure Railway Structure |
| 1,645,202 | 1927, October 11 | Roof Structure |
| 1,656,218 | 1928, January 17 | Pleasure Railway Car |
| 1,825,468 | 1931, September 29 | Pleasure Railway Structure |
