= Zippin Pippin =

Roller coaster at Bay Beach Amusement Park

- Previously known as Pippin

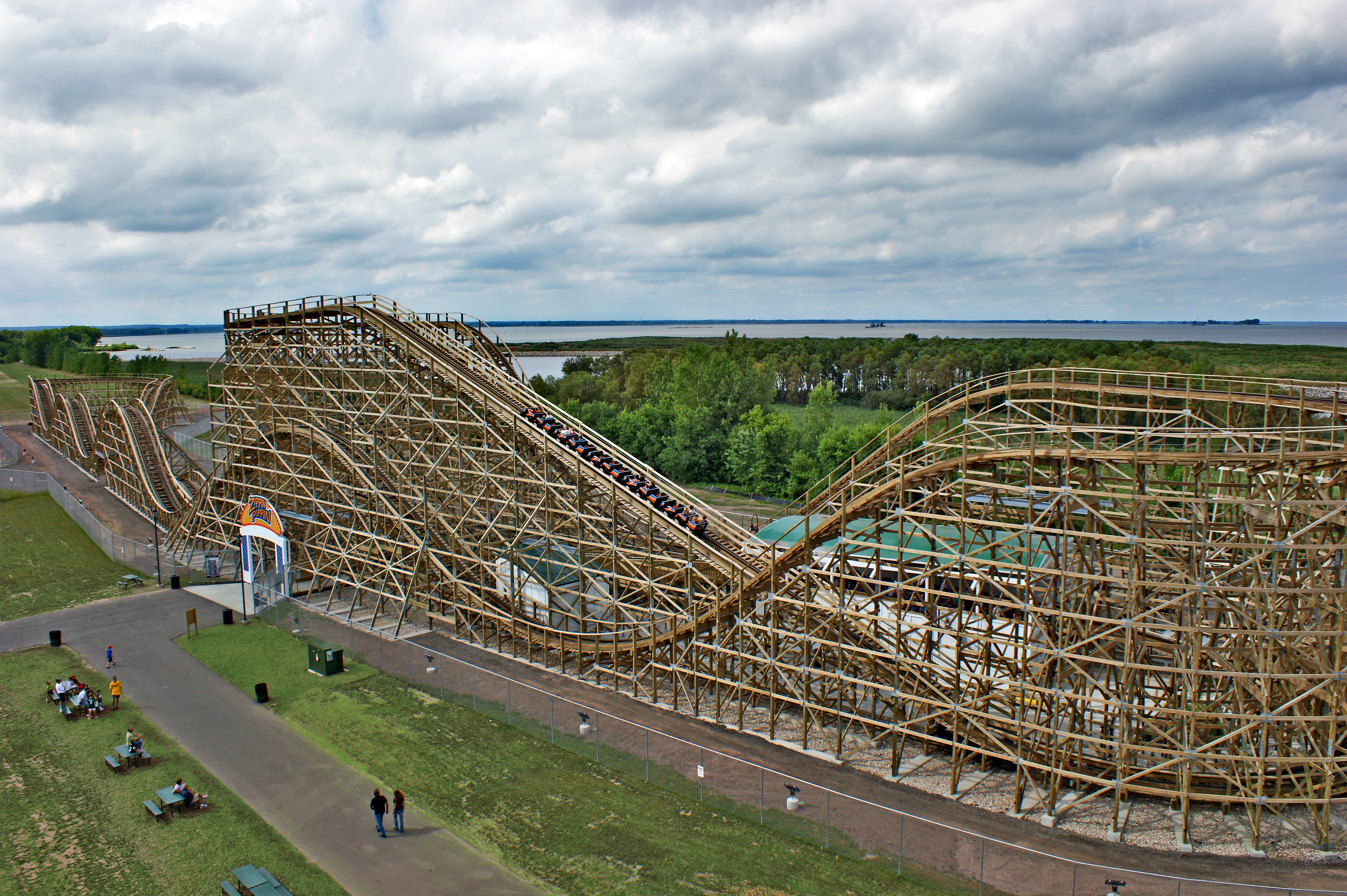
- Zippin Pippin at Bay Beach Amusement Park

Bay Beach Amusement Park
- Coordinates: 44°32′0″N 87°59′2″W
- Status: Operating
- Opening date: May 21, 2011

Libertyland
- Coordinates: 35.119543°N 89.982630°W
- Status: Removed
- Opening date: 1923
- Closing date: October 29, 2005

General statistics
- Type: Wood
- Manufacturer: Martin & Vleminckx
- Designer: John A. Miller
- Track layout: The Gravity Group
- Lift/launch system: Chain lift hill
- Height: 70 ft (21 m)
- Drop: 63 ft (19 m)
- Length: 2,347 ft (715 m)
- Speed: 42 mph (68 km/h)
- Duration: 1:30
- Max vertical angle: 50.6°
- Height restriction: 48 in (122 cm)
- Trains: 2 trains with 5 cars; riders arranged 2 across in 3 rows for a total of 30 riders per train
- Zippin Pippin at RCDB

Video

Zippin Pippin is a wooden roller coaster located at Bay Beach Amusement Park in Green Bay, Wisconsin. It originally opened in 1923 at the Libertyland amusement park in Memphis, Tennessee, and operated there until the park's closure in 2005.

The city of Green Bay, Wisconsin wanted to purchase the coaster, but it had deteriorated too far to be salvageable. They instead purchased the ride's blueprints, and in 2011, an exact replica opened at Bay Beach Amusement Park.

== History ==
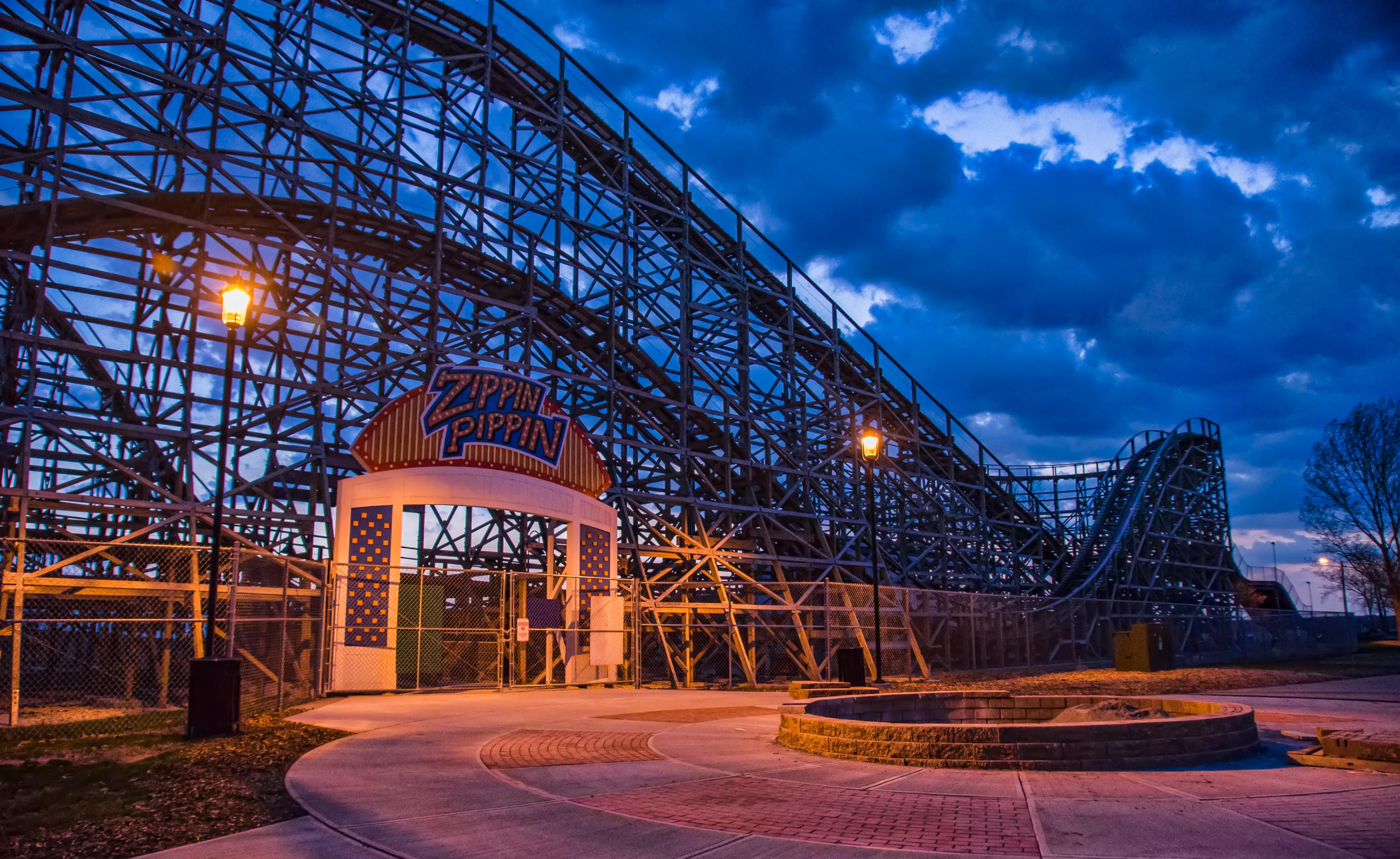
Sunrise on Zippin Pippin before opening day of 2013

Giant Coaster Dips was a wooden side-friction roller coaster constructed in 1913 in the former East End Park in Memphis, Tennessee by John A. Miller and Harry C. Baker. It was built from pine wood. As the park declined in popularity, the coaster was dismantled in 1922 and relocated adjacent to the horse track in Montgomery Park, later known as the Mid-South Fair.

The ride reopened at the Mid-South Fair as Pippin in 1923. After severe damage from a tornado in April 1928, Pippin was rebuilt "higher and longer than before" by July of the same year at a cost of $45,000.

In 1976, the city of Memphis opened an amusement park called Libertyland around the Pippin and a few other rides already on the fairgrounds. It was renamed Zippin Pippin and was billed as the most prominent and historic ride at Libertyland. It was Elvis Presley's favorite roller coaster. Presley was known to rent the entire park on occasion to ride it without fan interference. On August 8, 1977, eight days before his death, Presley rented the park from 1 a.m. to 7 a.m. to entertain a small number of guests, during which he rode Zippin Pippin for hours without stopping.

The Libertyland website described Zippin Pippin as "One of the oldest operating wooden roller coasters in North America". It cited the ride as being 2,865 feet (873 m) long, having top speeds of 40 mph (64 km/h), having a height of 70 feet (21 m), and a ride duration of 90 seconds. It credited Amusement Device Company as the manufacturer. On October 29, 2005, citing persistent loss of money, Libertyland closed for good.

Zippin Pippin stood out of operation for four years, as several parties fought in court over who would claim the ride. Initially, the ride was claimed by the city of Memphis, though it would still end up being auctioned off with all the other rides still belonging to the Mid-South Fair.

== Dismantling and relocation ==
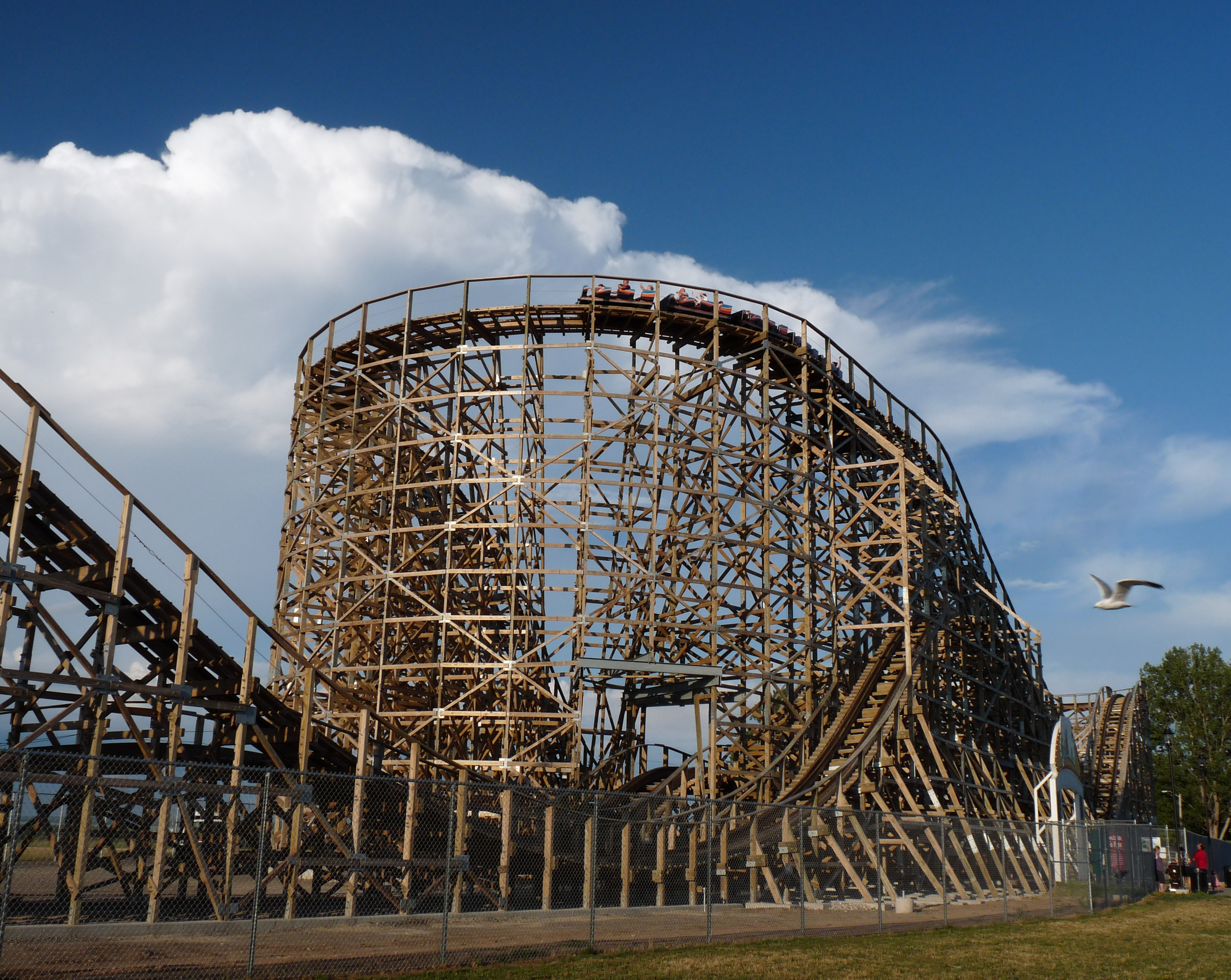
The ride in operation at Bay Beach Amusement Park in July 2012

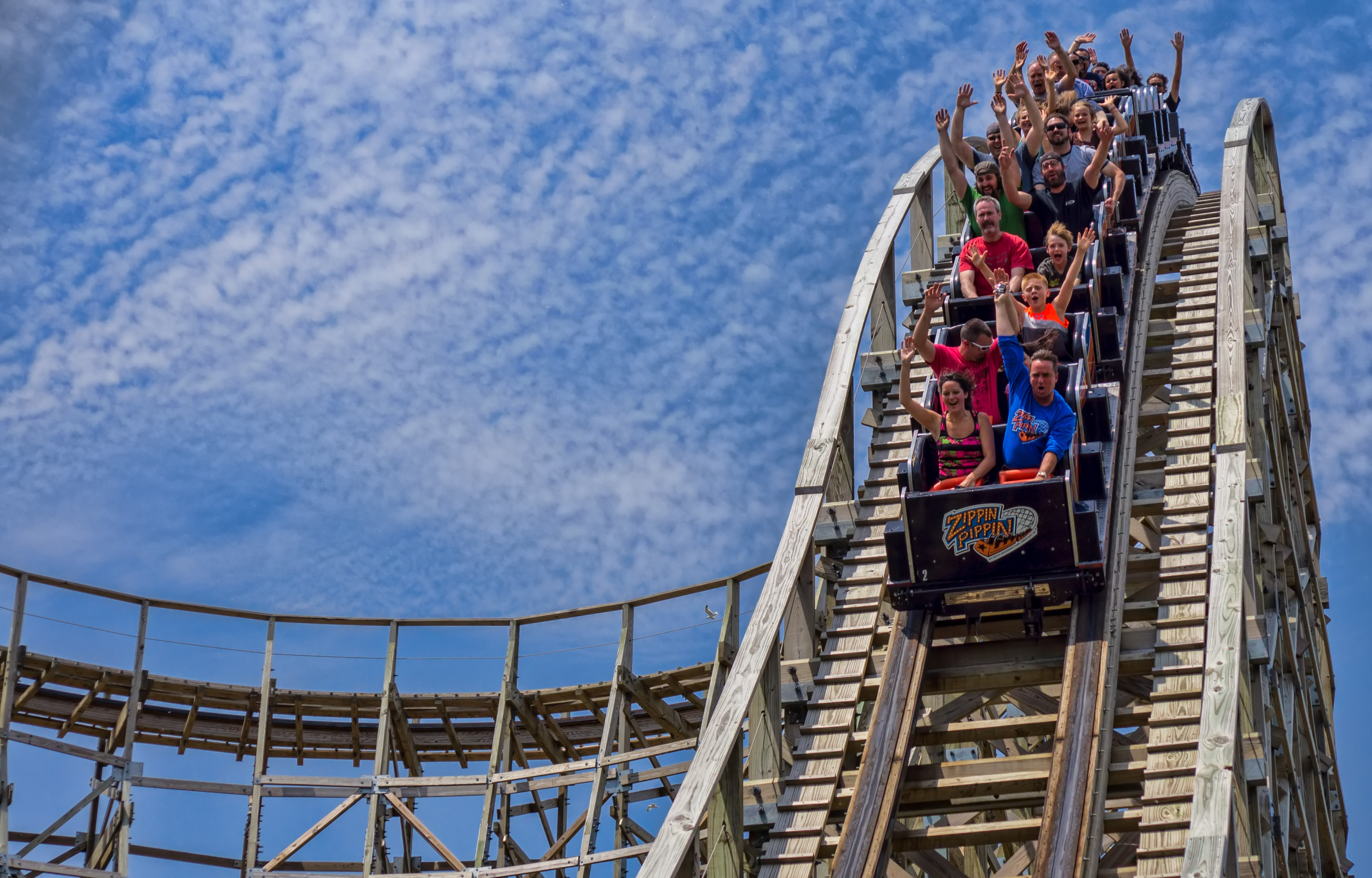
On June 23, 2013, Zippin Pippin celebrated its one millionth rider since its relocation

=== Dismantling ===
On June 21, 2006, Zippin Pippin was sold at auction to Robert Reynolds and Stephen Shutts, partners in a traveling museum called the Honky Tonk Hall of Fame & Rock-N-Roll Roadshow. They purchased the ride for $2,500, having initially planned to bid on only one of the ride's cars. The sale agreement required the buyer to remove the ride within 30 days. Reynolds and Shutts consulted with a coaster expert to determine the practicality of moving the entire coaster to another location.

On October 29, 2006, it was announced that the Roanoke Rapids Tourism Bureau had bought Zippin Pippin from Reynolds and Shutts and were bringing the coaster to am upcoming tourist development known as Carolina Crossroads. It would be a 1,000-acre (400 ha) music park, including the 1,500-seat Roanoke Rapids theater, an outdoor amphitheater, a water park, and an outlet shopping center.

On November 16, 2009, a section of Zippin Pippin's track was torn out to determine the salvageability of the materials. On January 28, 2010, crews began dismantling the Zippin Pippin with the hopes of preserving as much of the coaster as possible. The coaster had not been maintained since 2005.

=== Relocation to Green Bay ===
On February 7, 2010, the dismantlement was put on hold as Green Bay administrators visited Memphis to examine Zippin Pippin for use at Bay Beach Amusement Park. The ride had partially collapsed during dismantlement, but the deal was not affected as most of the materials were understood to be unsalvageable. After the Green Bay City Council approved plans to purchase Zippin Pippin, the city spent $3.8 million to purchase and rebuild the ride.

The groundbreaking for Zippin Pippin in its new location in Green Bay took place on August 25, 2010. It opened to the public on May 21, 2011. The ride saw 110,000 passengers in its first month of operation, and over 460,000 riders in its first full season. On June 23, 2013, Bay Beach Amusement Park recognized the one millionth rider on Zippin Pippin since its relocation to the park.

== Rankings ==
Zippin Pippin was ranked in Amusement Today's Golden Ticket Awards for Best New Ride of 2011 with 5% of the vote, coming in fifth place behind Twister at Gröna Lund, Wooden Warrior at Quassy Amusement Park, Cheetah Hunt at Busch Gardens Tampa Bay, and New Texas Giant at Six Flags Over Texas.

Golden Ticket Awards: Best New Ride for 2011
Ranking	5

Golden Ticket Awards: Top wood Roller Coasters
Year									1998	1999
Ranking									–	–
Year	2000	2001	2002	2003	2004	2005	2006	2007	2008	2009
Ranking	–	–	–	–	–	–	–	–	–	–
Year	2010	2011	2012	2013	2014	2015	2016	2017	2018	2019
Ranking	–	44 (tie)	–	37	–	45 (tie)	–	–	–	–
Year	2020	2021	2022	2023	2024	2025	2026			
Ranking	N/A	45 (tie)	41 (tie)	48	41	32	40			

== Incident ==
On June 20, 2016, a train carrying passengers collided with an empty train in the station. Three people received minor injuries.

== See also ==
- Amusement rides on the National Register of Historic Places
