= Jack Rabbit (Kennywood) =

Wooden roller coaster at Kennywood

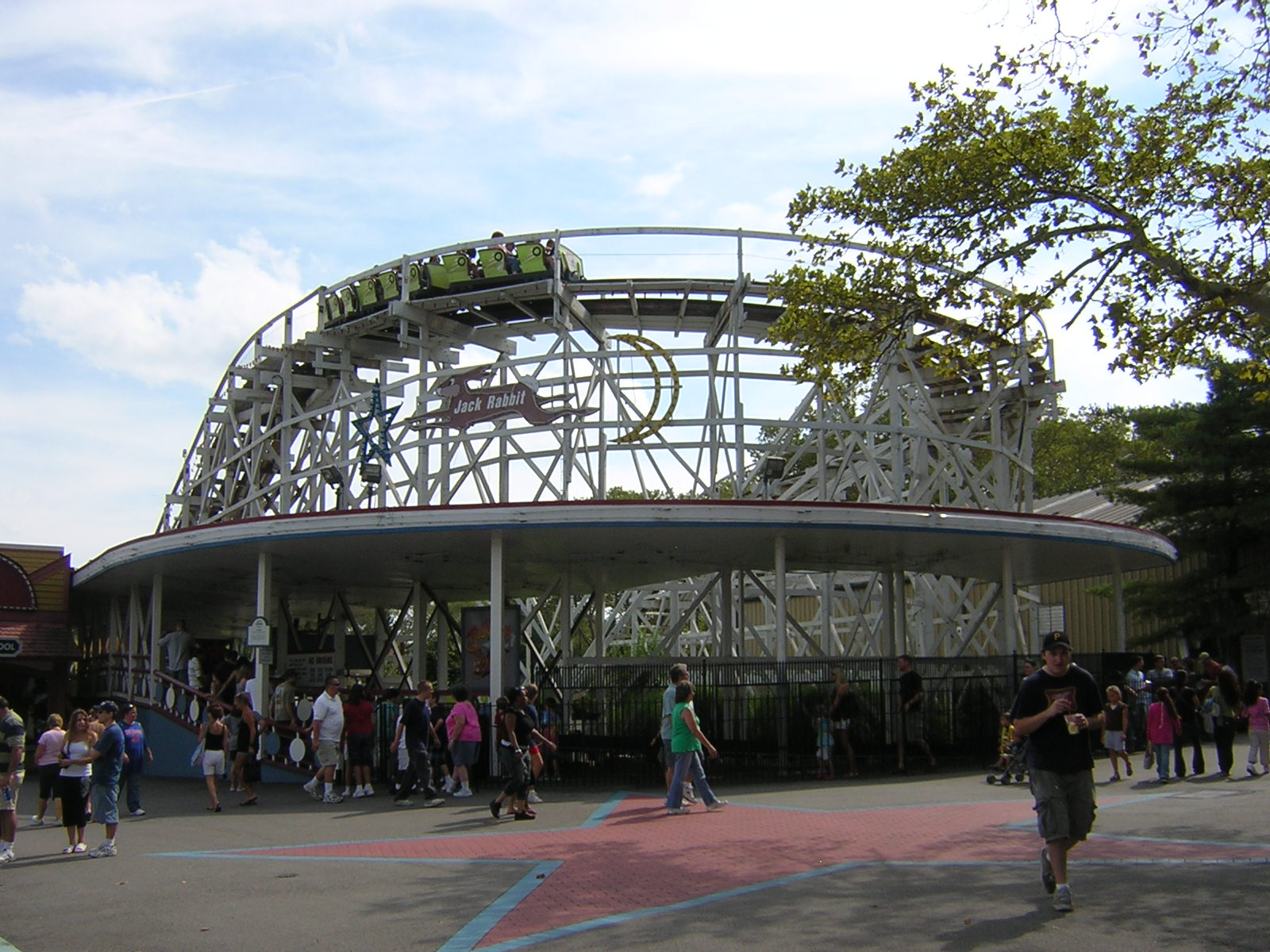

Kennywood
- Park section: Good Time Midway
- Coordinates: 40°23′12″N 79°51′46″W
- Status: Operating
- Opening date: June 18, 1920; 106 years ago
- Cost: $50,000 USD
- Kennywood Park
- U.S. National Historic Landmark District – Contributing property
- Location: 4800 Kennywood Blvd., West Mifflin, Pennsylvania
- Area: 40 acres (16 ha)
- Built: 1920
- Architect: Davidson, George S.
- Part of: Kennywood Park (ID87000824)
- Designated NHLDCP: February 27, 1987

General statistics
- Type: Wood
- Manufacturer: Harry C. Baker
- Designer: John A. Miller
- Track layout: Terrain, Out and Back roller coaster
- Lift/launch system: Chain lift hill
- Height: 40 ft (12 m)
- Drop: 70 ft (21 m)
- Length: 2,132 ft (650 m)
- Speed: 45 mph (72 km/h)
- Inversions: 0
- Duration: 1:36
- Max vertical angle: 45°
- Height restriction: 42 in (107 cm)
- Trains: 3 trains with 3 cars; riders arranged 2 across in 3 rows for a total of 18 riders per train
- Jack Rabbit at RCDB

Jack Rabbit is a wooden roller coaster located at Kennywood Park in West Mifflin, Pennsylvania. Designed and built by John A. Miller and Harry C. Baker, Jack Rabbit opened in 1920, making it the fifth oldest roller coaster in the world. It is also the second oldest operating roller coaster in the United States. The ride's three trains were manufactured by Edward Vettel Sr. in 1951 and contain three cars of six seats each. A popular early feature of the ride was a tunnel which covered the turnaround section after the first drop, but this was removed in 1947. In 1991, the tunnel was restored at a slightly shorter length.

Jack Rabbit was built shortly after Miller patented a new track design in 1920. This design involved the use of wheels both under and over the track, which allowed Miller to create the attraction's largest 70-foot (21 m) drop, which was very large for the time. It is also known for its double dip element following the lift hill.

According to Rick Sebak, producer of Pittsburgh history programs for WQED, the layout and train design results in the rear seat of each train experiencing the greatest amount of airtime.

In 2019, Kennywood released a video of Jack Rabbit estimated to be from 1920 on their YouTube channel. The video features clips of people on the ride and shots taken from the front row seat of Jack Rabbit. Kennywood claims their video is "the oldest coaster POV video in the world".

== Awards ==
The nonprofit organization American Coaster Enthusiasts (ACE) designated Jack Rabbit as a Coaster Classic. ACE also designated Jack Rabbit as an ACE Coaster Landmark in June 2010. Additionally, it is a contributing structure to the Kennywood Park historic district, listed on the National Register of Historic Places.

Golden Ticket Awards: Top wood Roller Coasters
Year									1998	1999
Ranking									20	22
Year	2000	2001	2002	2003	2004	2005	2006	2007	2008	2009
Ranking	–	36	37	42	34	28	37	33	34	39
Year	2010	2011	2012	2013	2014	2015	2016	2017	2018	2019
Ranking	20	23	16	18	19	21	20	26	20	20
Year	2020	2021	2022	2023	2024	2025	2026			
Ranking	N/A	–	12	15	17	19	20			

== Gallery ==
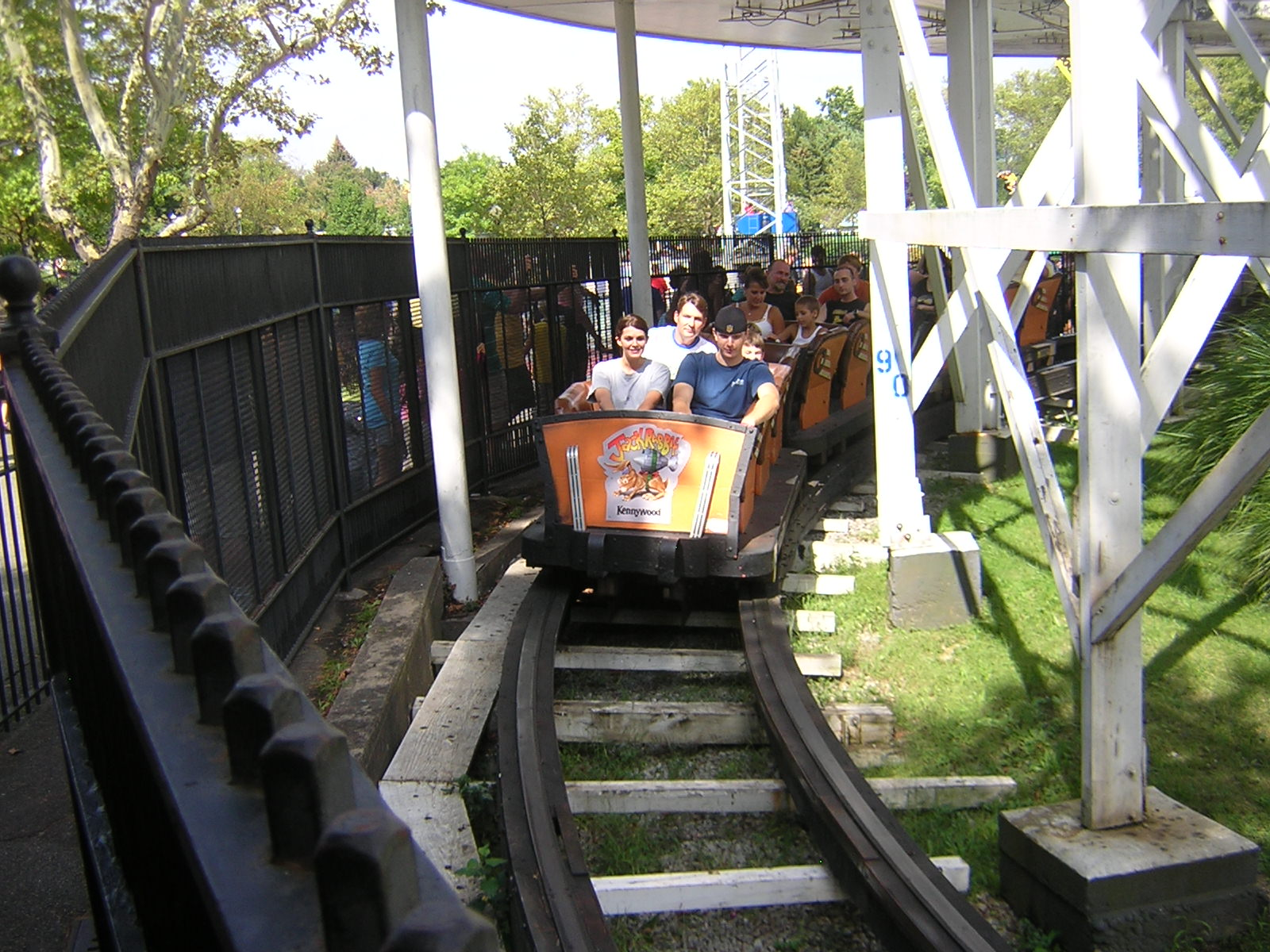
The orange train after departing the station

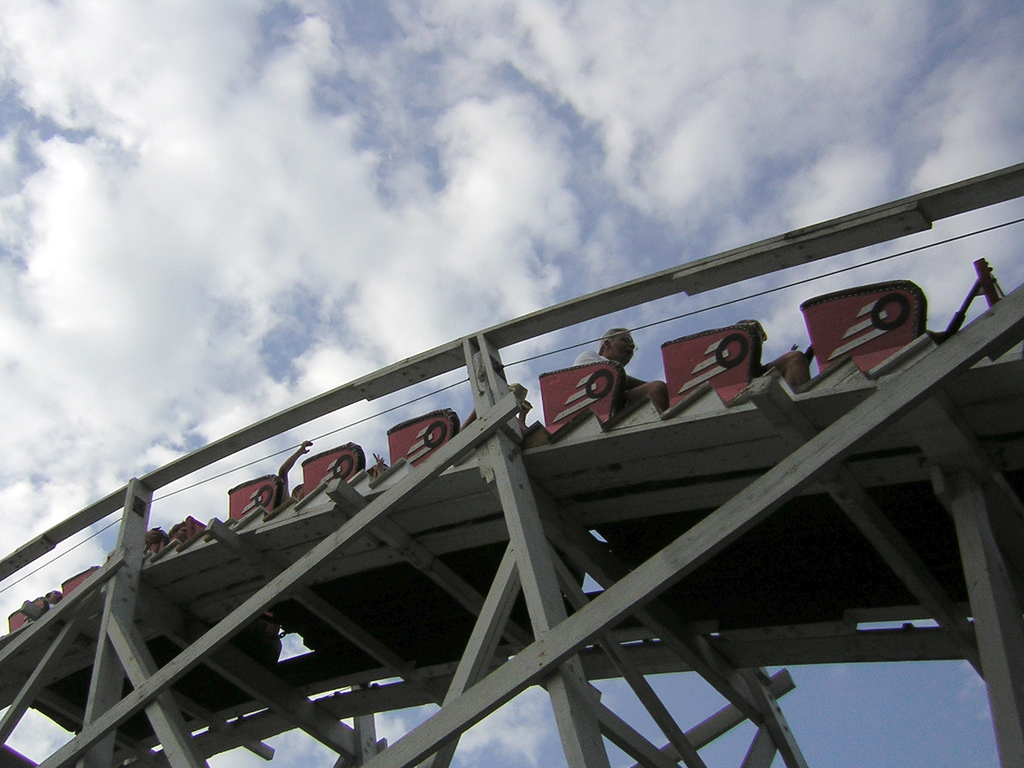
The pink train begins its descent down the double dip. This train has since been repainted orange.

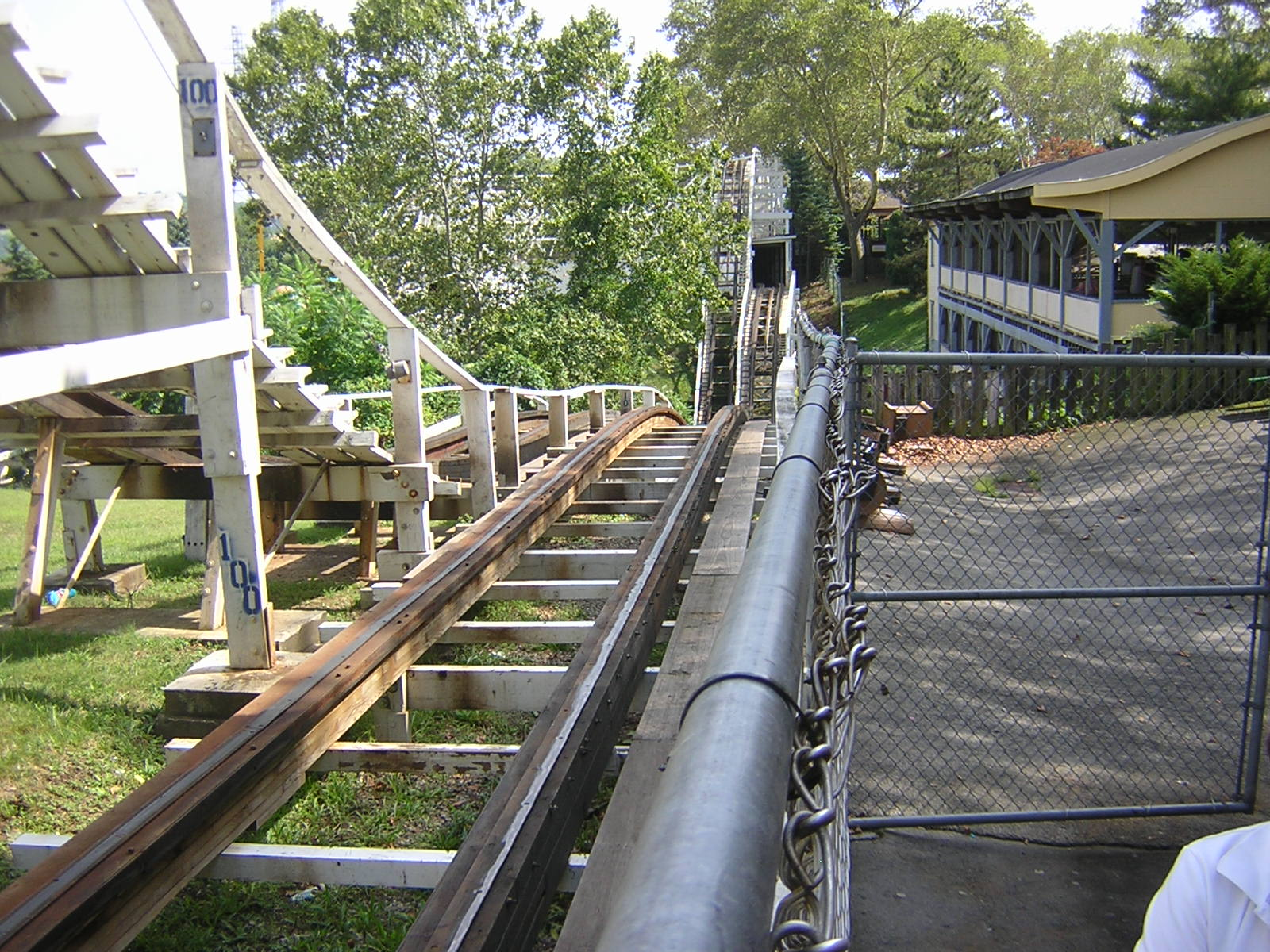
The double dip, Jack Rabbit's signature element, as seen from the queue at left, along with the ride's first drop next to it.

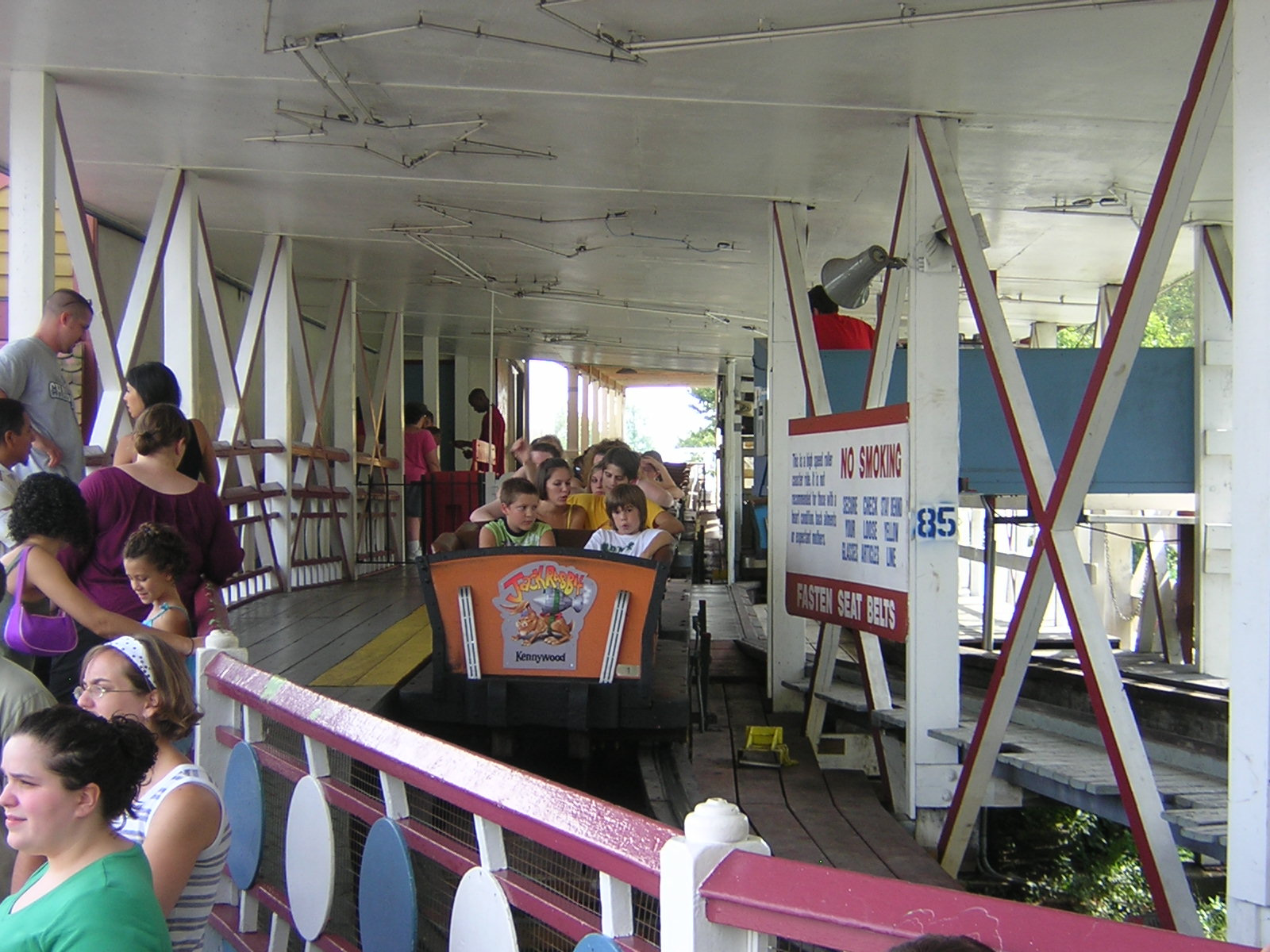
The orange train loading in the station
