= Jack Rabbit (Seabreeze) =

Wooden roller coaster at Seabreeze Amusement Park

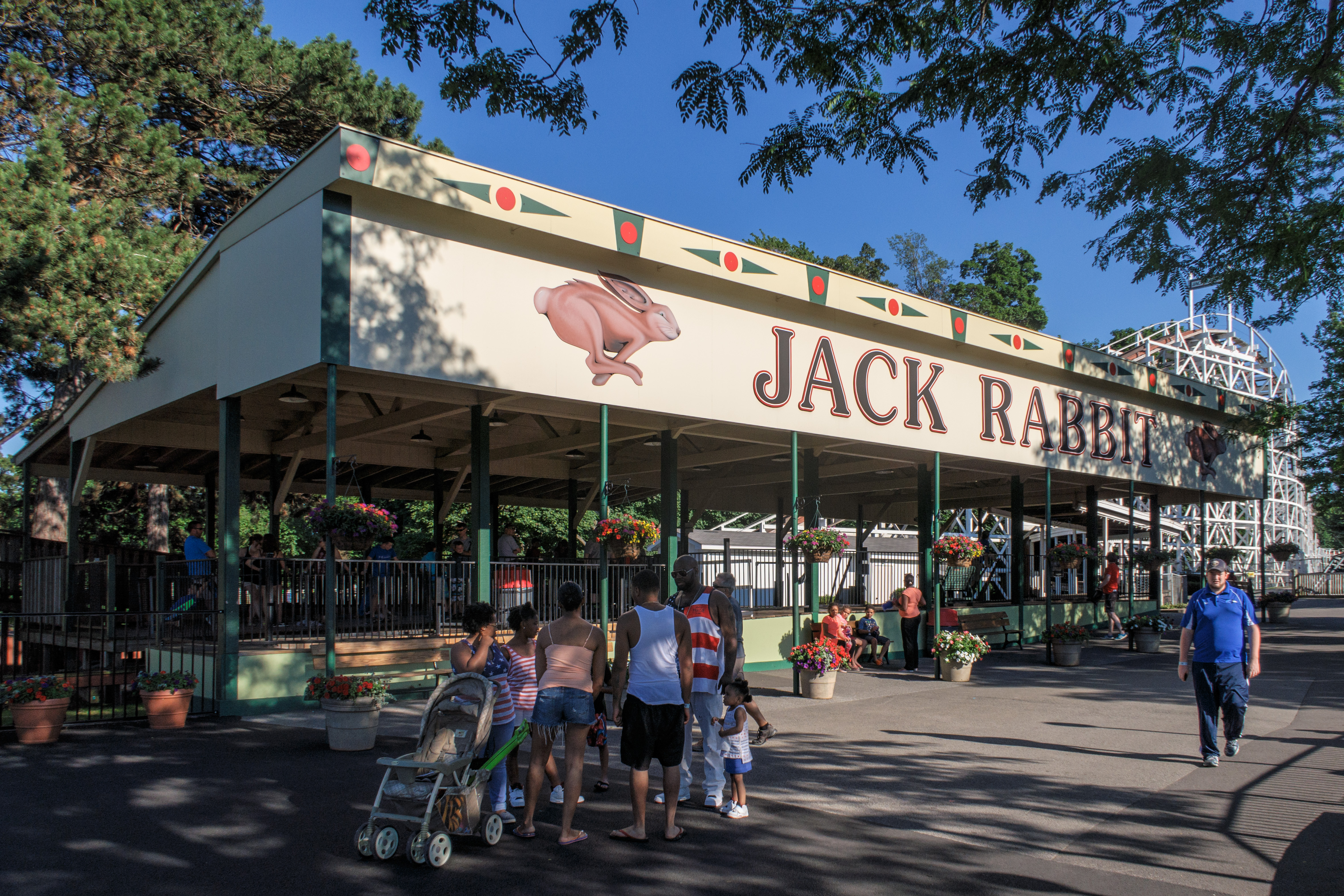
- Station

Seabreeze Amusement Park
- Location: Seabreeze Amusement Park
- Coordinates: 43.231552°N 77.543231°W
- Status: Operating
- Opening date: 1920

General statistics
- Type: Wood
- Manufacturer: Harry C. Baker
- Designer: John A. Miller
- Track layout: Terrain, Out and Back
- Lift/launch system: chain
- Height: 75 ft (23 m)
- Length: 2,130 ft (650 m)
- Speed: 42 mph (68 km/h)
- Max vertical angle: 52°
- Height restriction: 48 in (122 cm)
- Trains: Single train with 5 cars; riders arranged 2 across in 2 rows for a total of 20 riders per train
- Jack Rabbit at RCDB

Jack Rabbit is a wooden roller coaster at Seabreeze Amusement Park in Irondequoit, New York. Jack Rabbit is a terrain coaster that features seven dips, a turnaround, and a tunnel. It opened on May 31, 1920. Jack Rabbit is the oldest operating coaster in the United States, as the oldest standing, Leap-The-Dips, has not operated since 2023. Jack Rabbit is also the third oldest operating roller coaster in the world.

== Background ==
When nearby Ontario Beach Park ceased operations in 1919 season, Seabreeze became the only amusement park in Rochester. In a large expansion project, several new rides were added. The centerpiece of the 1920 expansion was Jack Rabbit, a “mammoth-sized” wooden roller coaster that was described as “the largest roller coaster in New York State, outside of Coney Island” by the local newspaper. It was the fastest roller coaster in the world when it opened.

Jack Rabbit was designed by John A. Miller. It was built by Harry C. Baker in just eight weeks, using 120 workmen. Jack Rabbit is the oldest existing coaster to feature Miller’s revolutionary underfriction wheel design that locks the coaster trains to the track, allowing for larger and steeper drops that produce greater speeds.

Jack Rabbit uses portions of the park’s natural topography to its advantage. The ride features 2,130 feet of track with a 75-foot first drop, several of Miller’s signature camel-back airtime hills, and a tunneled turnaround with a final drop into a ravine before returning to the station. The tunnel was added in 1928.

In 2020, Jack Rabbit celebrated its centennial anniversary.

== Ride timeline ==
1920 - Jack Rabbit opened on May 31, 1920 as the fastest roller coaster in the world. The coaster utilized John A. Miller's new underfriction wheel system that securely fastened the cars to the track. The ride is owned by the Rochester Coaster Corporation, which in turn is owned by two Michigan men.

1922 - Jack Kirby became the ride manager and operator for the Rochester Coaster Corporation. The Kirby family lived in the house that was located beneath Jack Rabbit.

1923 - A large fire in the south end of the park destroyed the Jack Rabbit station, lift hill, and first drop.

1924 - Jack Rabbit opened for the season following repairs following the fire. The new station building was larger and reconfigured.

1928 - Tunnel added to final drop into the ravine.

1940s - Jack Kirby assumed ownership of Jack Rabbit from the Rochester Coaster Corporation.

1946 - New "safety" trains from National Amusement Devices were installed. The trains were stainless steel with red leather, and featured a locking lap bar.

1972 - Jack Kirby died and the Long family assumed ownership of Jack Rabbit.

1982 - During the winter of 1982-1983, the house beneath Jack Rabbit was demolished.

1989 - New trains from D.H. Morgan Manufacturing were installed. The trains featured individual bucket seats and a safety bar that sat closer to the lap. The new trains, being wider than the previous ones, required the track of the ride to be widened. The station was reconfigured to permit flush loading, rather than having separate loading and unloading areas.

2007 - The station was renovated and the drop ceiling removed. Revealed on the rafters was a relic from the past: a sign that read "Pay as you leave".

2020 - Jack Rabbit turned 100 years old, but Seabreeze was closed due to the COVID-19 pandemic. The ride operated on a few occasions for park staff in order to maintain the record as the oldest continuously operating roller coaster in the United States. An updated brake system was installed using compressed air to assist with the raising and lowering of the friction brakes.

2021 - Jack Rabbit had a proper birthday celebration at 101 years old.

== Historical facts & information ==
=== Coaster trains ===
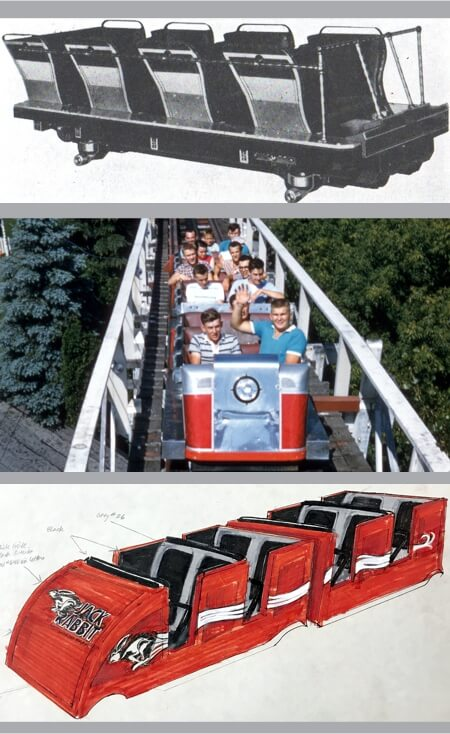
Various trains from throughout the years

1920-1945 (top image): Original train by John A. Miller, featuring bench seats with an open front. As was customary for coaster cars during that era, there were no locking lap bars or seat belts, and the trains were equipped with rigid handles for riders to hold on to. On the busiest days, Jack Rabbit operated three trains of three cars, each holding twenty-four passengers per ride.

1946-1988 (center image): Train by National Amusement Devices, featuring a sleek stainless-steel body with a headlight on the front. These trains featured the latest in coaster car safety: the locking lap bar. The trains were refurbished in 1978 and the stainless steel body was replaced with solid Formica. One train was red, and the other was green. Each train had three cars, holding 18 passengers per ride.

1989-present (bottom image): Train by D. H. Morgan Manufacturing, featuring individual bucket seats and an updated lap bar design that sits closer to the lap, providing additional safety. This train has trailered fiberglass cars which allow for a smoother ride, and reduce the wear and tear on the track and structure.

=== "Pay as you leave" ===
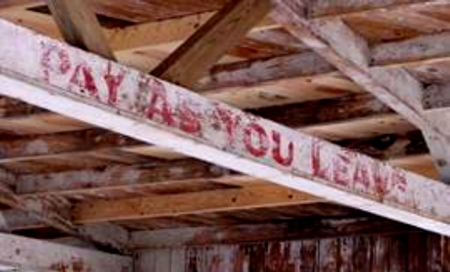
A sign above the station reads "Pay as you leave"

When visiting Seabreeze in 1920, admission to the park was included in the trolley fare. Each attraction within the park was individually priced, and one would pay at a cashier booth located at the attraction’s exit after riding. On Jack Rabbit, each passenger was given a serial-numbered punch-card upon boarding, which the operator would punch after each trip around the track. Upon exiting, a rider would surrender their punch-card to the cashier, and pay the total fare due. The words “Pay as you leave” were painted on an overhead beam in the station.

=== Drive wheel ===
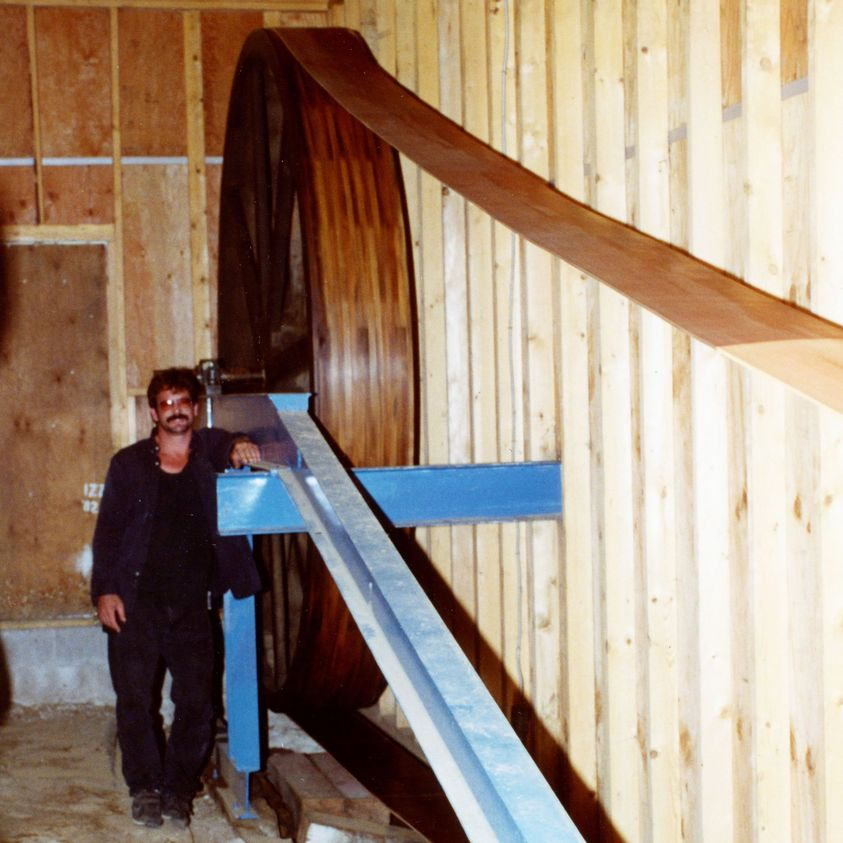
The original Jack Rabbit drive wheel

A drive wheel which once pulled the train to the top of the lift hill is currently on display in the Carousel Museum. It is ten feet in diameter, made of maple wood, and weighs 1,000 pounds. A 12-inch leather belt strapped around the wheel generated enough force to pull the train to the top. It has since been replaced by a modern drive system.

=== Recognition ===
On August 15, 2015 the American Coaster Enthusiasts (ACE) recognized Jack Rabbit as an ACE Coaster Landmark, a designation reserved for rides of historical significance. ACE “commended the management of Seabreeze on its continued operation and preservation of a historic classic during its 95th year of operation”.

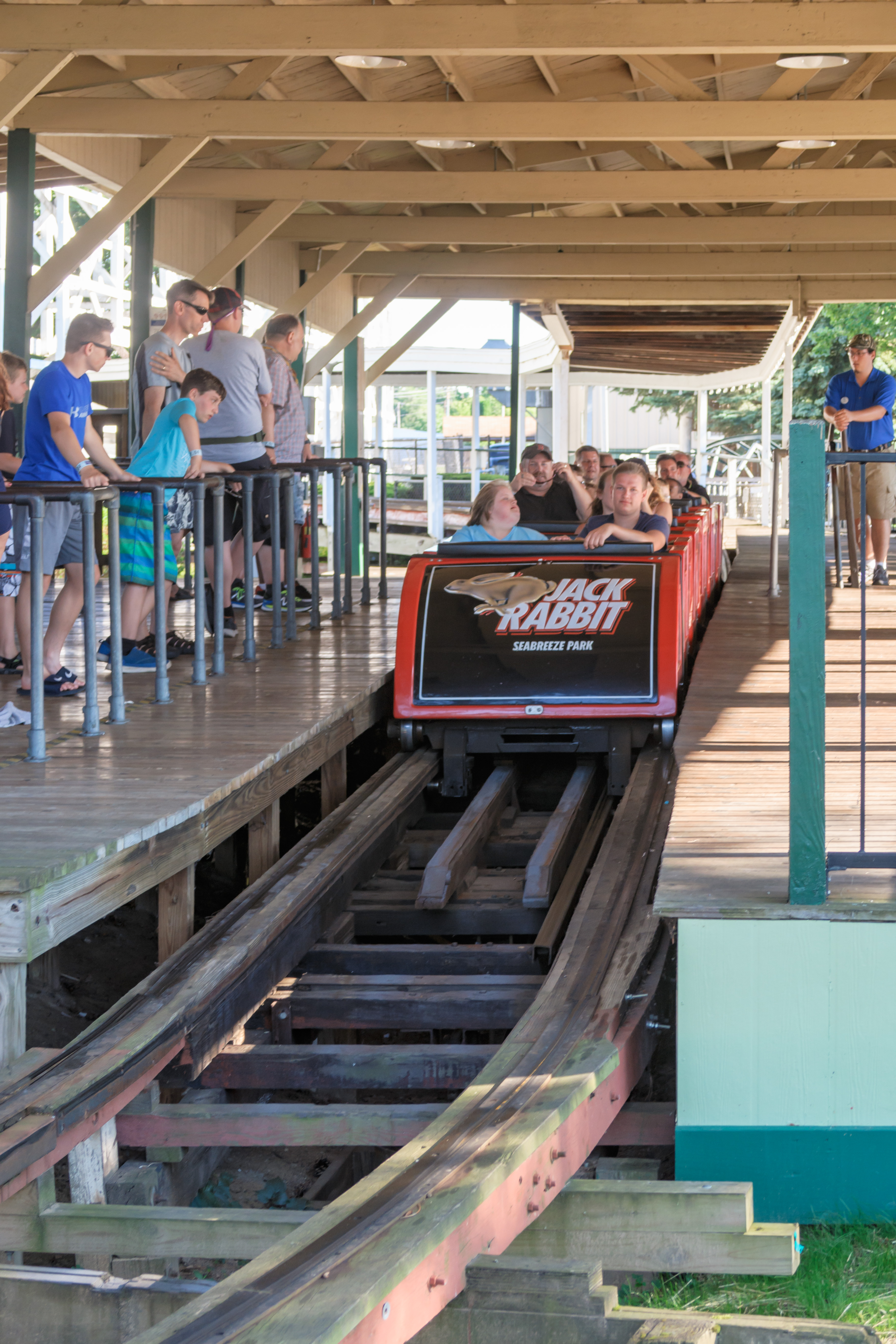
Train in station

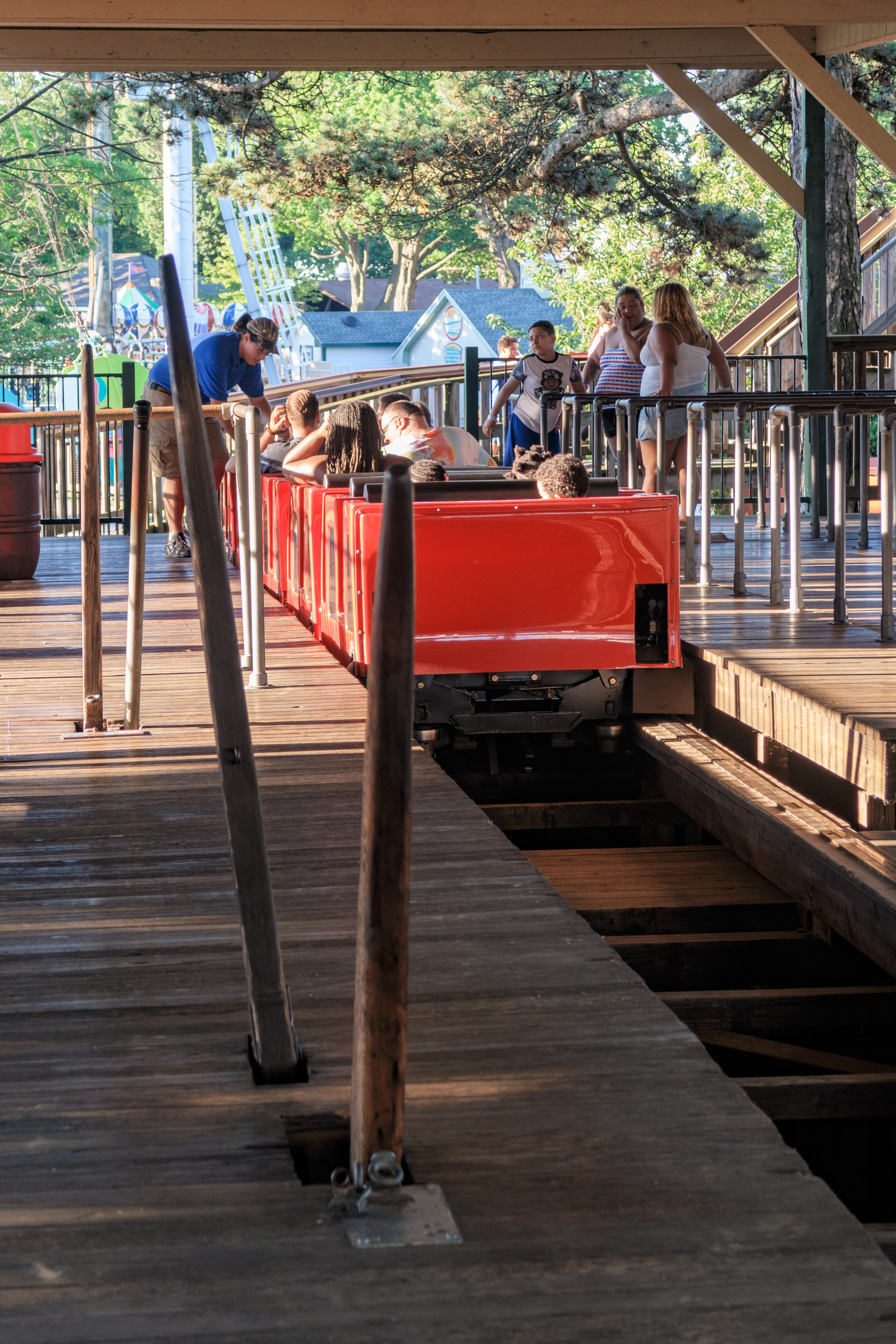
Brake levers

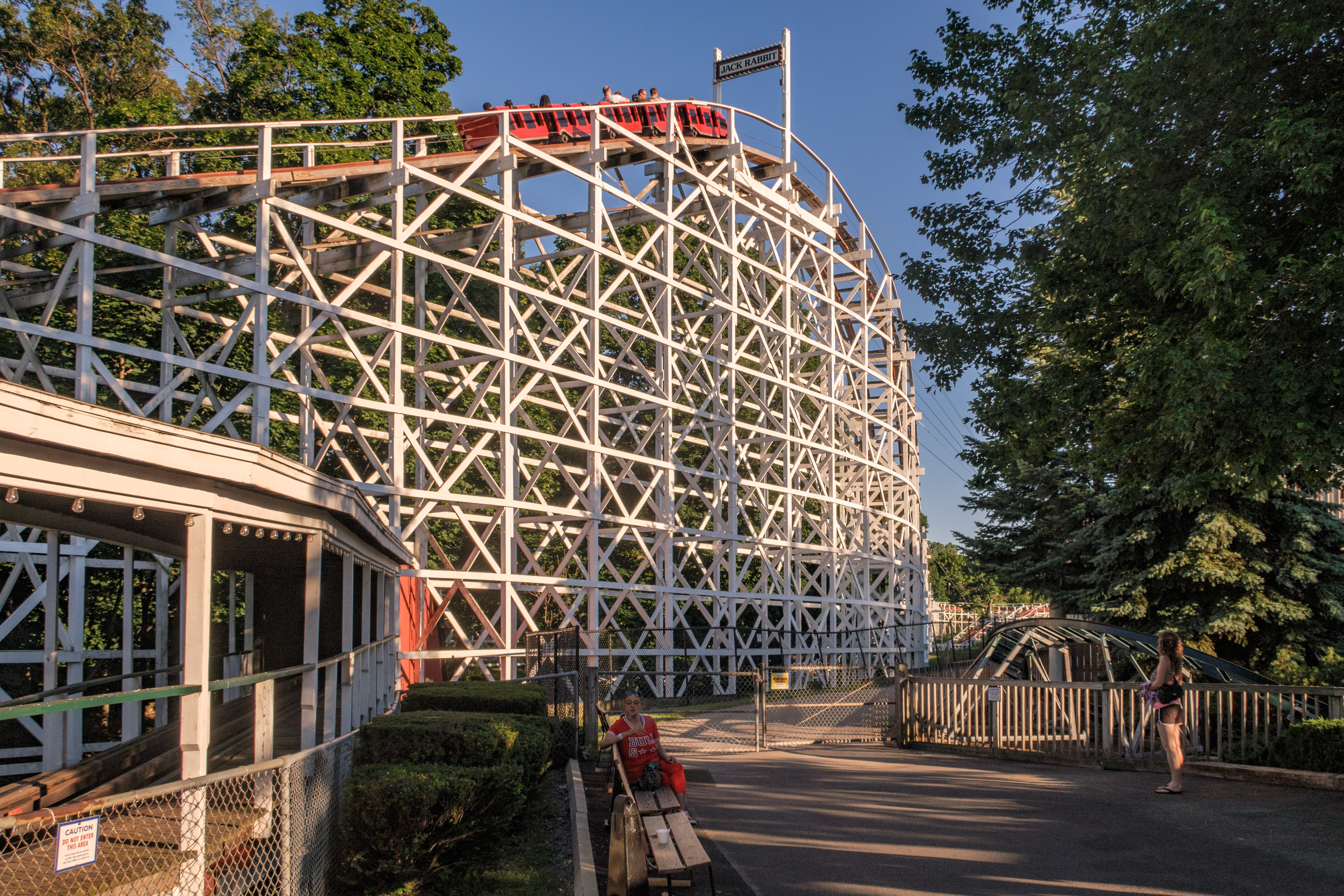
Train on the lift hill

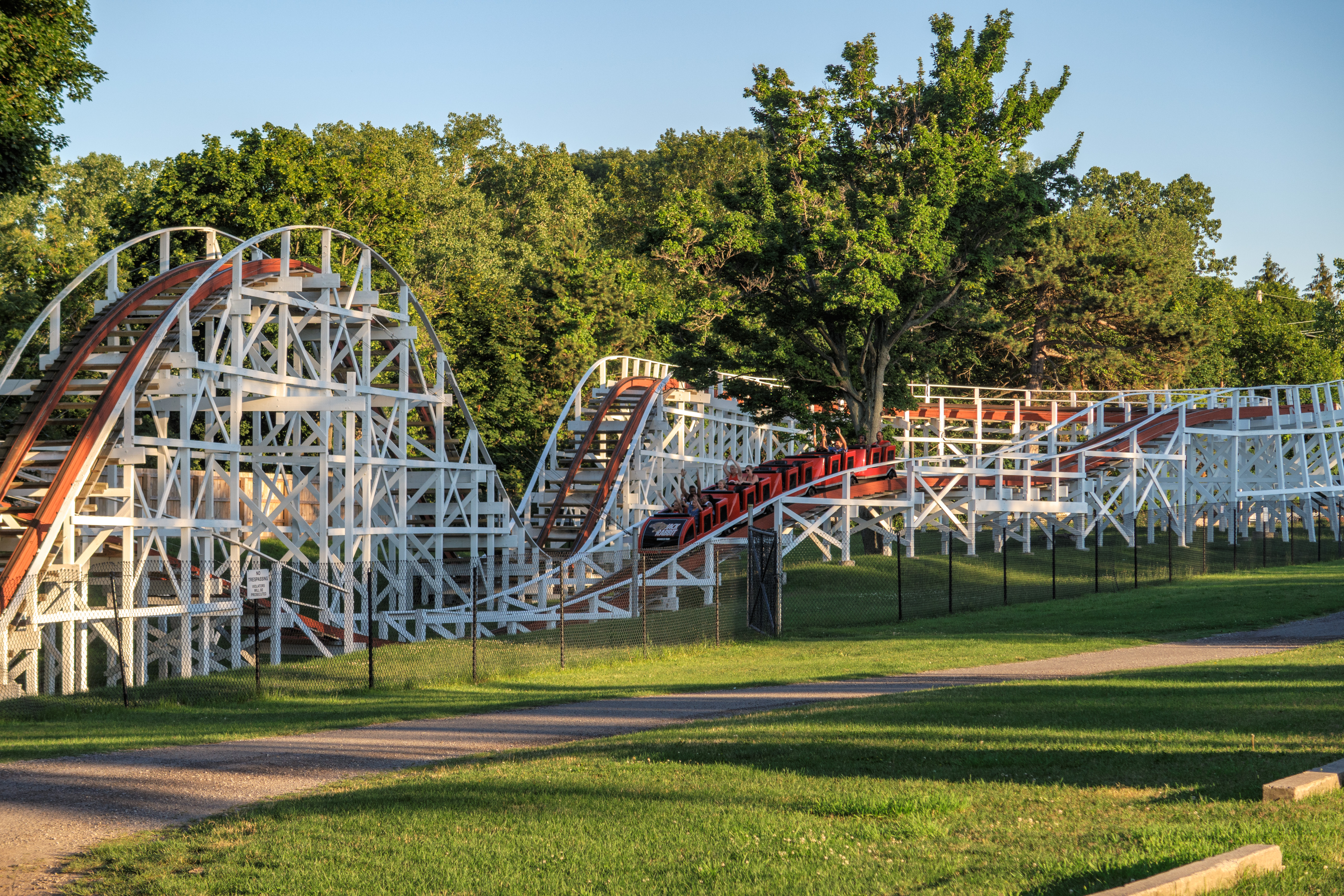
Train descending its double-dip element
