= Harry C. Baker =

American roller coaster designer

Harry C. Baker (1886 or 1887 – August 23, 1939) was an American entrepreneur most notable for his involvement with the construction of roller coasters. Through partnerships and later, as president of the Harry C. Baker Company, Baker would be involved with notable designs such as the Cyclone at Coney Island, the Blue Streak at Woodcliffe Pleasure Park, and Jack Rabbit at Kennywood.

== Biography ==
Baker was the former manager of Rexford Park, Schnectady, New York and served on the staff at Riverview Park in Chicago. From 1920 to 1923, Baker served as the Secretary and Treasurer of the John A. Miller-led Miller & Baker, Inc. Serving as office manager of the firm's Grand Central Terminal location, he was involved with the construction of over 40 coasters.

In 1923, Baker went on to form his own company. In 1927, the Rosenthal brothers contracted with Baker's firm and designer Vernon Keenan to build the Coney Island Cyclone. After the success of this endeavor, Keenan and Baker once again teamed to build one of the most debated roller coasters of the 1920s, the Blue Streak at Woodcliffe Pleasure Park.

== Coasters ==
During his lifetime, Baker was involved in the building of nearly 40 roller coasters, mostly with John A. Miller.

Name	Park	Location	Operational	Collaborator
Big Dipper	Roton Point	Norwalk, CT	1914 - 1933 (Note: Frederick Ingersoll coaster opened as Tango Dips and rebuilt by Miller and Baker in 1924)	
North Wind Coaster	Coney Island	Brooklyn, NY	1915 - 1929	Joseph McKee
Jack Rabbit	Willough Beach Park	Willoughby, OH	1915 - 1924	Joseph McKee
Jack Rabbit	Revere Beach	Revere, MA	1916 - 1924	John A. Miller
Deep Dipper	Frederick Road Park	Baltimore, MD	1920 - 1922	John A. Miller
Jack Rabbit	Natatorium Park	Spokane, WA	1920 - 1968	John A. Miller
Deep Dips	Olympic Park	Irvington, NJ	1920 - 1922	John A. Miller
Roller Coaster	Riverview Park	Des Moines, IA	1920 - 1978	John A. Miller
Big Dipper	Riverview Park	Chicago, IL	1920 - 1967	John A. Miller
Jack Rabbit	Seabreeze	Rochester, NY	1920 -	John A. Miller
Lightning	Riverside Park	Agawam, MA	1920 - 1933	John A. Miller
Giant Coaster	Central Park	Rockford, IL	1921 - 1942	John A. Miller
Comet	Palisades Amusement Park	Cliffside Park, NJ	1921 - 1925	John A. Miller
Jack Rabbit	Kennywood	Pittsburgh, PA	1920 -	John A. Miller
Pippin	Riverview Park	Chicago, IL	1921 - 1967	John A. Miller
Sky Rocket	Steeplechase Island	Bridgeport, CT	1921 - 1951	John A. Miller
Roller Coaster	Arnolds Park	Arnolds Park, IA	1922 - 1929	John A. Miller
Gorge Ride	Cascade Park	New Castle, PA	1922 - 1935	John A. Miller
Big Dipper	Gordon Gardens	Cleveland, OH	1922 - 1927	John A. Miller
Big Dipper	Idora Park	Oakland, CA	1922 - 1928	John A. Miller
Greyhound	Island Beach Park	Burlington, NJ	1922 - 1928	John A. Miller
Ravine Flyer	Waldameer & Water World	Erie, PA	1922 - 1938	John A. Miller
Skyrocket	Fairyland Park	Kansas City, MO	1923 - 1966	John A. Miller
Wildcat	Lakeside Park	Salem, VA	1923 - 1967	John A. Miller
Giant Coaster	Lakewood Park	Barnesville, VA	1923 - 1982	John A. Miller
Zippin Pippin	Bay Beach Amusement Park (Note: Originally located at East End Park then Libertyland, both in Memphis, TN)	Green Bay, WI	1923 -	John A. Miller
Jack Rabbit	Paxtang Park	Harrisburg, PA	1923 - 1929	John A. Miller
Humming Bird	Riverview Beach Park	Pennsville, NJ	1923 - 1967	John A. Miller
Fireball	Riverview Park	Chicago, IL	1923 - 1967	John A. Miller
Dips	Buckeye Lake	Buckeye Lake, OH	1924 - 1958	John A. Miller
Skyrocket	Meyer's Lake Park	Canton, OH	1924 - 1946	John A. Miller
Wildcat	Bertrand Island	Mount Arlington, NJ	1925 - 1983	Herbert Schmeck
Cyclone	Coney Island	Brooklyn, NY	1927 -	Vernon Keenan
Cyclone	Rock Springs Park	Chester, WV	1927 - 1970	
Zingo	Crystal City	Tulsa, OK	1928 - 1956	
Wiz	Lotus Isle Park	Portland, OR	1928 - 1931	
Blue Streak	Woodcliff Pleasure Park	Poughkeepsie, NY	1928 - 1941	Vernon Keenan
Wildcat	Idora Park	Youngstown, OH	1930 - 1984	Herbert Schmeck
Skylark	Roton Point	Norwalk, CT	1934 - 1942	
Derby Racer	Revere Beach	Revere, MA	1937 - 1949	
Comet	Crescent Park	Riverside, RI	1939 - 1961	
Cyclone	New York World's Fair	Flushing, NY	1939 - 1940	Harry Traver (Note: Baker / Harry Traver design, first used at 1939 New York World's Fair, later rebuilt by Joseph E. Drambour at Riverside Park.)
Thunderbolt	Riverside Park	Agawam, MA	1941 -	Joseph E. Drambour
