= Riverview Park (Iowa) =

Coordinates: 41.622°N 93.629°W

Riverview Park was an amusement park in Des Moines, Iowa, from 1915 to 1978. What began in pre-1915 as a zoological garden and trolley destination in an area of Des Moines known as Highland Park would become Riverview Amusement Park, a popular family entertainment oasis in early Iowa history. It was built upon an island, accessed via a wooden bridge, by a group of nine local businessmen that were headed up by a Des Moines movie-theater mogul named Abe Frankle. In the early years various entertaining events and attractions that made Riverview Park a fondly remembered family get-away included free acts featuring death-defying daredevils and musical band concerts. The early amusement rides included in 1923 a new carousel (PTC#65) from the Philadelphia Toboggan Company, whose carousels represented some of the finest examples of hand carved carousel horses in America, and a large Carousel Pavilion building to house it. In 1928 a Herschell-Spillman menagerie carousel with intricate hand-carved animals replaced the PTC carousel. In 1920 John Miller–designed a figure-eight roller coaster featuring eight full dips that all went to the ground level for the park. In 1940, the Riviera Ballroom was added and provided big band dances throughout the 1940s and 1950s and teen dances in the 1960s and 1970s. The Riviera Ballroom was inducted into the Iowa Rock and Roll Hall of Fame in 2010.

Riverview Amusement Park continued to prosper and grow over the decades up until the late 1960s. When Disneyland opened in 1955 with such amazing success, corporate sponsored theme parks started springing up all over the country. Small traditional amusement parks found it increasingly difficult to compete against the large corporate theme parks and many started closing around the country. Riverview was feeling the pressure also but was holding on to some profitability with its large returning clientele consisting of corporate and company summer picnic bookings every year. The new theme park in the area, Adventureland, made an offer to buy Riverview after the end of the 1978 summer season. Adventureland reportedly was going to keep Riverview operating for all of the company picnic business that was booking at Riverview, as well as for the general public. When the sale was completed in spring of 1979, Adventureland decided to close Riverview for good rather than keep the aging park open.

A few of the rides and attractions that were found at Riverview still live on. Some rides and attractions were moved to Adventureland. These include but are not limited to, the Haunted House which later closed to be replaced by ‘Dragon’ roller coaster. Riverview's Himalaya, Hampton Kiddie Cars, and Haunted House were initially moved to Adventureland.

The Riverview site sat abandoned until 2014 when a project was started to convert it into a municipal park with a playground and permanent bandstand. The project was completed in fall 2020, although its opening event season was disrupted by the COVID-19 pandemic.

== See also ==
- Adventureland (Iowa)
