= Bay Beach Amusement Park =

Amusement park in Green Bay, Wisconsin

- Previously known as Bay View Beach (1892–1920)

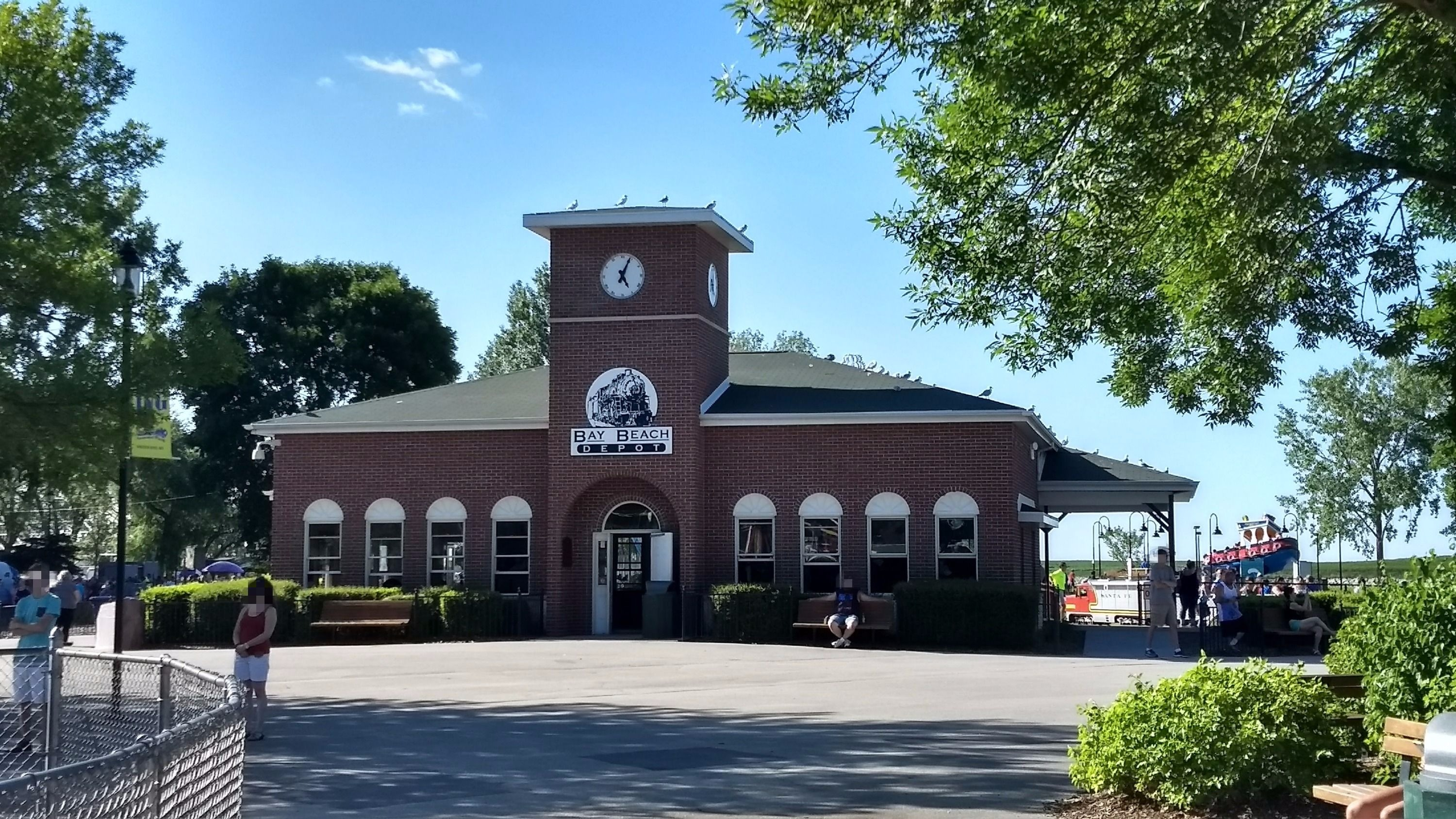
- Train depot
- Interactive map of Bay Beach Amusement Park
- Location: 1313 Bay Beach Road, Green Bay, Wisconsin
- Coordinates: 44°31′51.3″N 87°58′51″W
- Status: Operating
- Opened: 1892 (134 years ago)
- Owner: City of Green Bay, Wisconsin
- Operating season: May to September

Attractions
- Total: 22
- Roller coasters: 1
- Website: www.greenbaywi.gov/baybeach

Bay Beach Amusement Park is a municipal amusement park in Green Bay, Wisconsin. The park contains rides, concessions, and a multi-purpose pavilion. The park is adjacent to the Bay Beach Wildlife Sanctuary.

== History ==
The park's history dates to the early 1890s when entrepreneur Mitchell Nejedlo purchased the land. Originally intended to be divided and sold for summer cottages, he turned it into Bay View Beach. Bay View Beach had a dance hall, a bar, and a bathhouse, however, because it was swampy and infested with mosquitoes, the park didn't attract many visitors. Despite this, its first roller coaster was installed in 1901.

In 1908, Captain John Cusick bought the resort from Nejedlo. Cusick built an 8-foot dock that extended 570 feet into the bay, then bought a steamboat to transport customers from Walnut Street Bridge to Bay View Beach. That same year, he oversaw the installation of a shoot the chute ride, which featured a boat that could hold 12 people. The boat would slide down a 50-foot ramp and into the water below.

In 1911, Bay View Beach was sold to Frank Emery Murphy and Fred A. Rahr. In 1920, they donated the 11-acre park, along with all its buildings and attractions, to the city of Green Bay to be used as a city park, called Bay Beach Amusement Park.

Pollution of the bay eventually caused the swimming beach to close. From the 1930s to the early 1970s, Bay Beach Amusement Park's pavilion hosted concerts, political rallies, dances, fireworks, and other events. On August 9, 1934, President Franklin D. Roosevelt visited the park in celebration of the city of Green Bay's tercentennial.

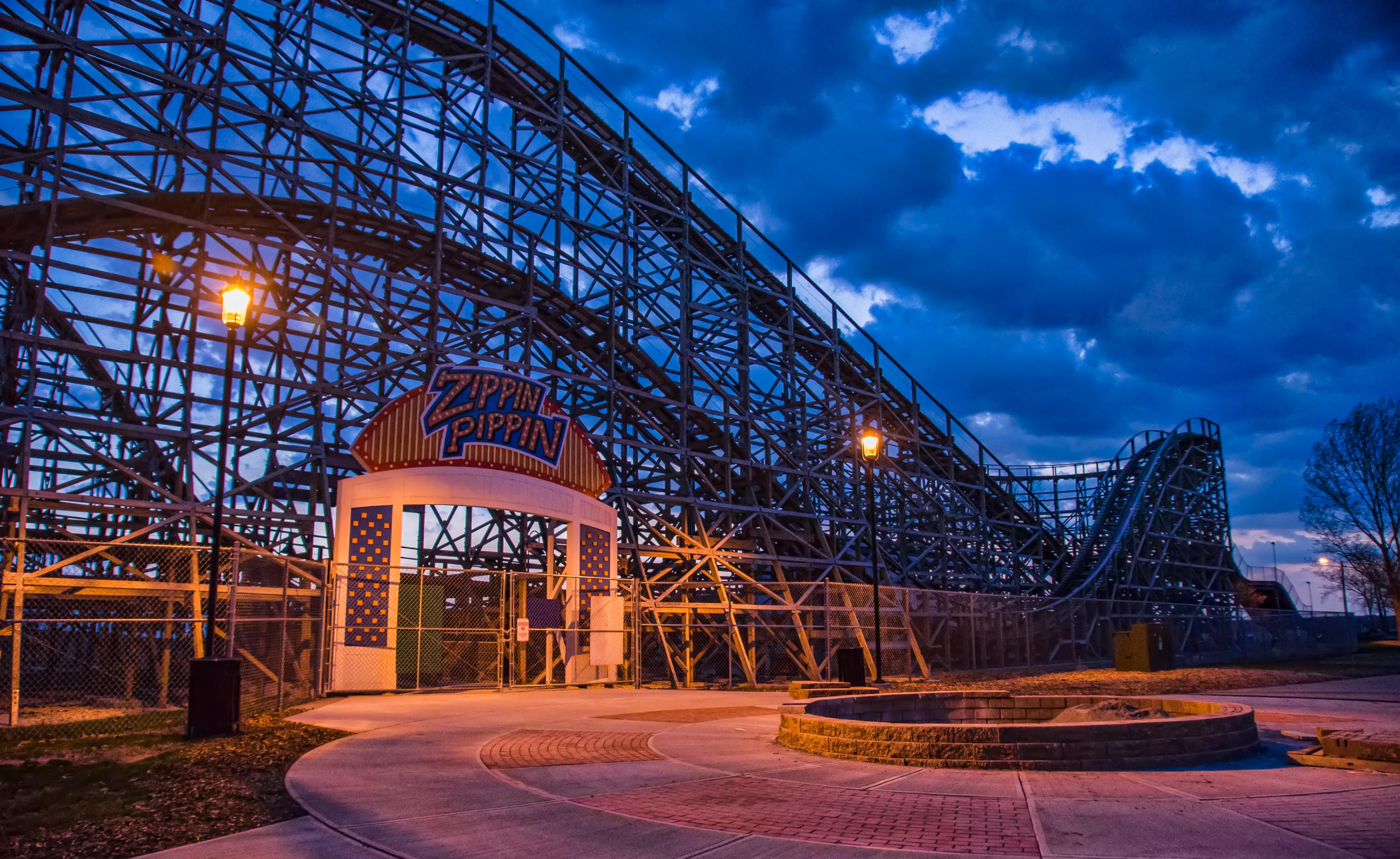
Zippin Pippin in 2013

In 2006, 46 acres (190,000 m^{2}) of land west of the park boundary was purchased to upgrade and expand the park. Plans included replacing the original Ferris wheel and expanding the tracks of the park's train ride to circle the enlarged acreage. On March 2, 2010, the city of Green Bay approved the purchase of the nearly century-old Zippin Pippin wooden roller coaster from Memphis, Tennessee, where it had sat derelict for five years. A groundbreaking took place on August 25, 2010, and construction on Zippin Pippin began in September 2010. Construction was completed in April 2011, and the ride opened a month later in May.

In early 2013, an expansion plan was proposed. Phase 1 included the addition of the Sea Dragon ride and further expansion of the train tracks. Several trains and cars were donated to the park in 2014, with an additional 3,000 feet of track being added to its length for the 2015 season. In 2017, the Falling Star ride was introduced. In 2019, a 100-foot Ferris wheel opened. In 2023, the park added a NebulaZ ride. In early 2024, it was announced that upgrades to several rides were planned, including upgrading the Bumper Cars and the addition of an inclusive playground, the latter of which officially opened in June. Later that same year, it was announced that the park had received a grant for shoreline improvements and a wildlife viewing platform. Construction began in late 2025.

== Current rides ==
=== Roller coasters ===
Coaster	Opened	Manufacturer	Type
Zippin Pippin	2011	The Gravity Group	Wooden roller coaster

=== Thrill rides ===
Name	Opened	Manufacturer	Type
Bay Beast	2023	Moser's Rides	Drop tower (Gravity Tower)
NebulaZ	2023	Zamperla	NebulaZ
Scat	1985	Venture Manufacturing	Scat
Sea Dragon	2013	Chance Morgan	Swinging ship
Yo - Yo	1996	Chance Rides	Yo-Yo

=== Family rides ===
Name	Opened	Manufacturer	Type
Big Wheel	2019	Chance Rides	Ferris wheel
Bumper Cars	1993	S.D.C.	Bumper cars
Ferris Wheel	1952	Eli Bridge Company	Big Eli Ferris Wheel
Giant Slide	1971	Unknown	Fun slide
Helicopters	1964	Allan Herschell Company	Helicopters
Merry-Go-Round	1971	Chance Rides	Carousel
Rockin’ Tug	2016	Zamperla	Rockin’ Tug
Scrambler	1977	Eli Bridge Company	Scrambler
Tilt-a-Whirl	1982	Sellner Manufacturing	Tilt-A-Whirl
Train	1956	Crown Metal Products	Miniature train

=== Kiddie rides ===
Name	Opened	Manufacturer	Type
Boats	1972	Allan Herschell Company	Boats
Granny Bugs	1998	Zamperla	Jump Around
Jeeps	1972	Zamperla	Jeeps
Lady Bugs	1977	Eyerly Aircraft Company	Lady Bugs
Race Cars	1998	Zamperla	Race Cars
Sky Fighters	1998	Molina & Son's	Race Cars

== Former rides ==
=== Roller coasters ===
Name	Opened	Closed	Manufacturer	Type
Greyhound	1929	1936	Breinig Construction Company	Wooden roller coaster
Jack Rabbit	1901	1928	Breinig Construction Company	Wooden roller coaster

=== Rides ===
Name	Opened	Closed	Manufacturer	Type
Bay Beast	2016	2021	Zamperla	Pounce n' Bounce
Chairplane	2013	2023	Smith & Smith	Swing ride
Falling Star	2017	2021	Chance Rides	Falling Star
Miniature Train	1929	1954	Unknown	Miniature train

== Images ==
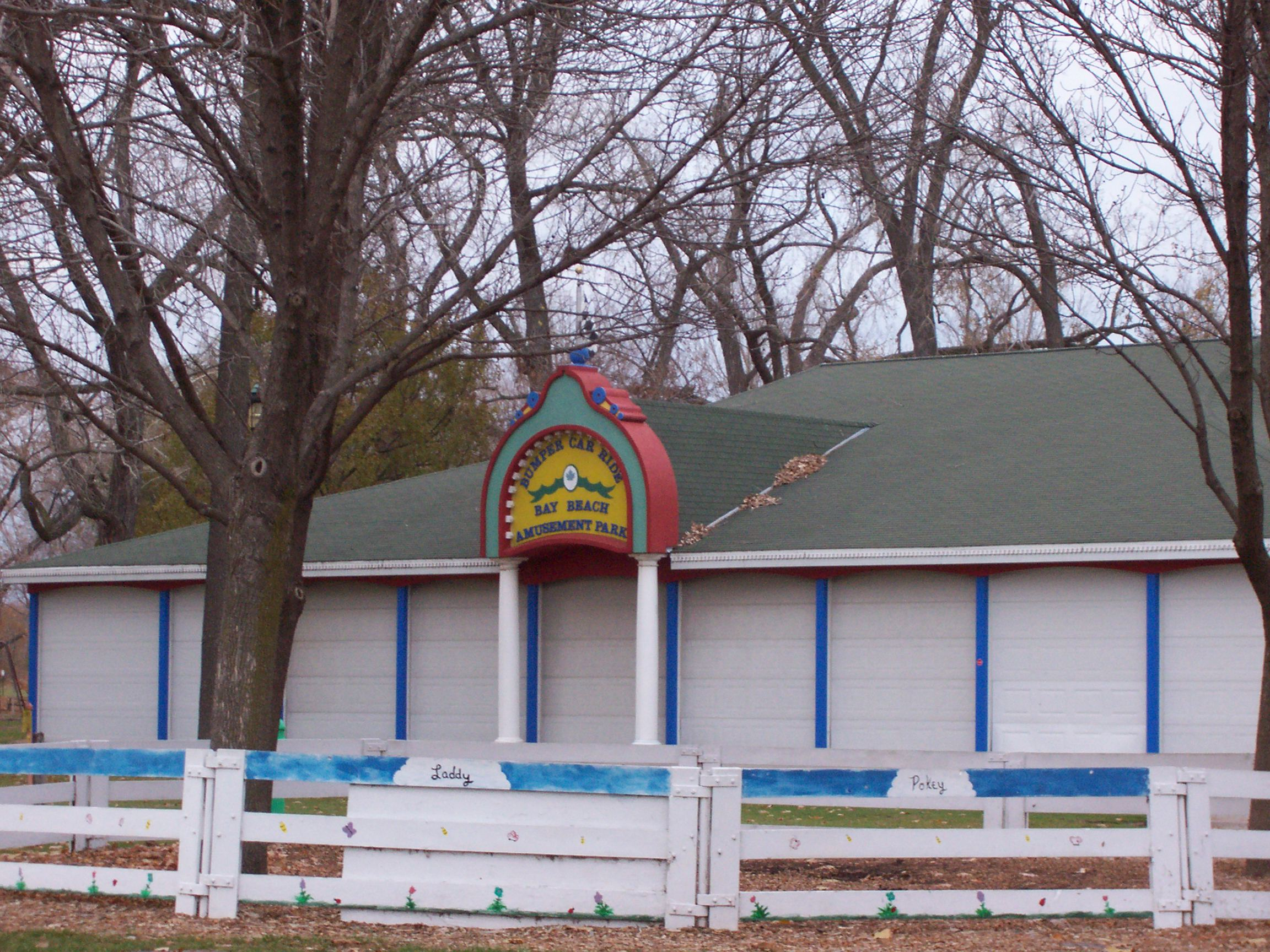
Bumper Cars building

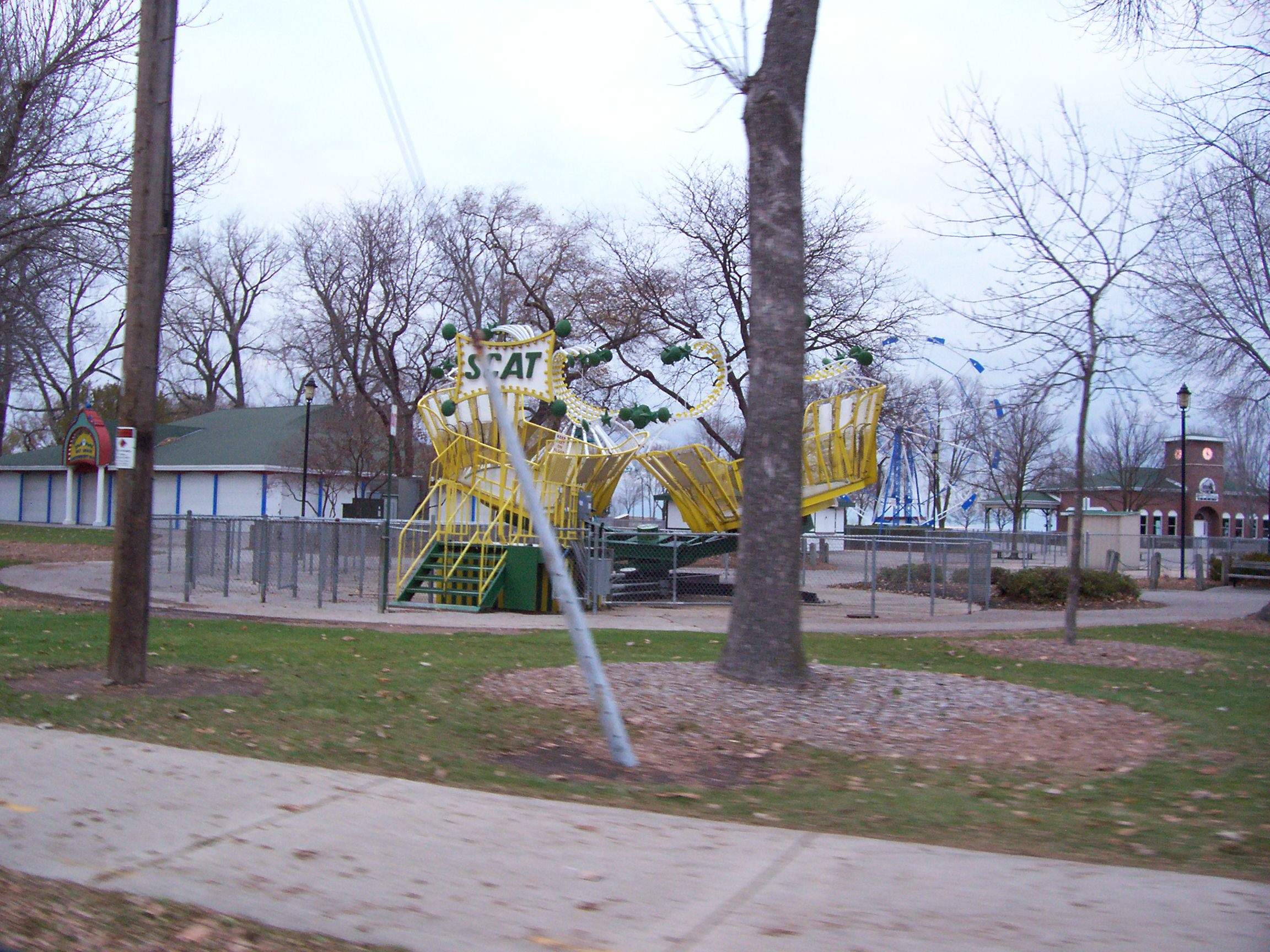
The Scat ride

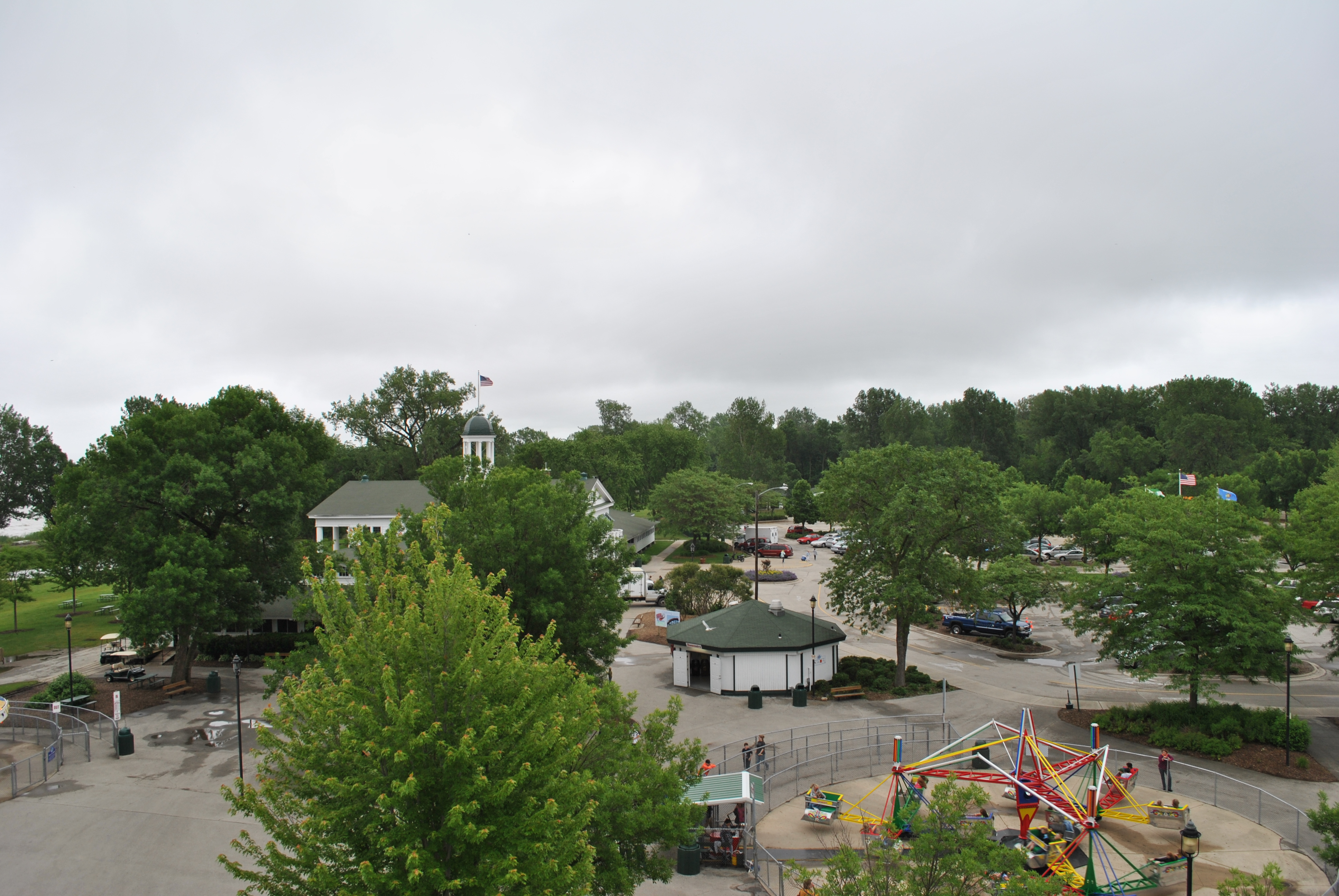
View from the top of the Ferris wheel
