= Villain (roller coaster) =

Defunct wooden roller coaster

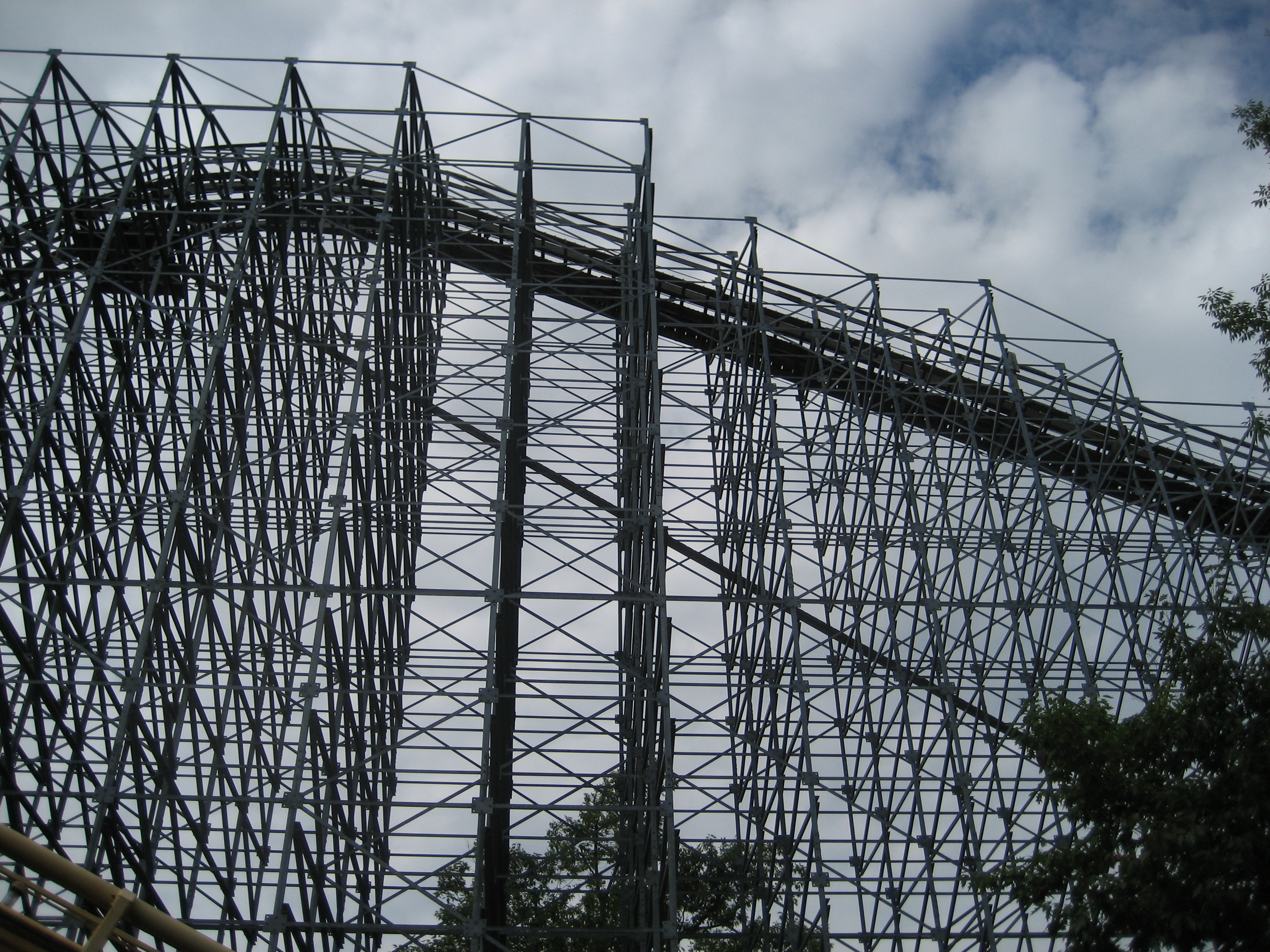
- Hybrid structure on Villain's lift hill.

Geauga Lake
- Location: Geauga Lake
- Coordinates: 41°21′10″N 81°22′21″W
- Status: Removed
- Opening date: May 5, 2000
- Closing date: September 16, 2007

General statistics
- Manufacturer: Custom Coasters International
- Track layout: Out and back
- Lift/launch system: Chain lift hill
- Height: 120 ft (37 m)
- Drop: 108 ft (33 m)
- Length: 3,980 ft (1,210 m)
- Speed: 59 mph (95 km/h)
- Inversions: 0
- Duration: 2:30
- Height restriction: 48 in (122 cm)
- Trains: 2 trains with 6 cars. Riders are arranged 2 across in 2 rows for a total of 24 riders per train.
- Villain at RCDB

Villain was a wooden roller coaster at the Geauga Lake amusement park in Aurora, Ohio. It was designed by Custom Coasters International (CCI), and built by Rocky Mountain Construction. The ride opened as part of the four-coaster expansion Six Flags brought to Geauga Lake between 1999 and 2000. It was a wooden hybrid, with steel supports and wood track. When it originally opened, the ride was moderately smooth, but by 2001 it had deteriorated and was re-tracked during the off-season by Martin & Vleminckx. This was the second CCI coaster to feature a "trick track" element, where the track banks from one side to another while staying on an otherwise straight path. On June 17, 2008, Villain was sold for scrap to Cleveland Scrap for $2,500 following the closure of Geauga Lake in 2007. The ride has since been demolished.

Currently, Villain's trains are located at Kings Island, another Cedar Fair park in Mason, Ohio. They have not been used for anything as of 2024.

== Demolition ==
In September 2007, Geauga Lake's amusement park section shut down, leaving only the water park, Wildwater Kingdom, in operation. While several of its rides were moved to other amusement parks, the park's wooden coasters, as well as the steel coaster Double Loop were not.

== Incidents ==
In July 2000, when the amusement park was known as Six Flags Ohio, 44-year-old Terri Wang of Milwaukee, Wisconsin, was injured while riding Villain. While on the ride, Wang was struck with several objects that were believed to be rocks or a cell phone. The impact of the objects caused her to endure a fractured skull and broken nose. Wang sued Six Flags because of the injuries that she sustained. The trial was held at Portage County Common Pleas Court, and the jury determined Six Flags was guilty of negligence. Wang was awarded $1.1 million for medical expenses and $2.5 million in punitive damages because of the trial’s verdict.
