= Big Dipper (Geauga Lake) =

Former roller coaster in Ohio

- Previously known as: Sky Rocket (1925–1947); Clipper (1948–1968)
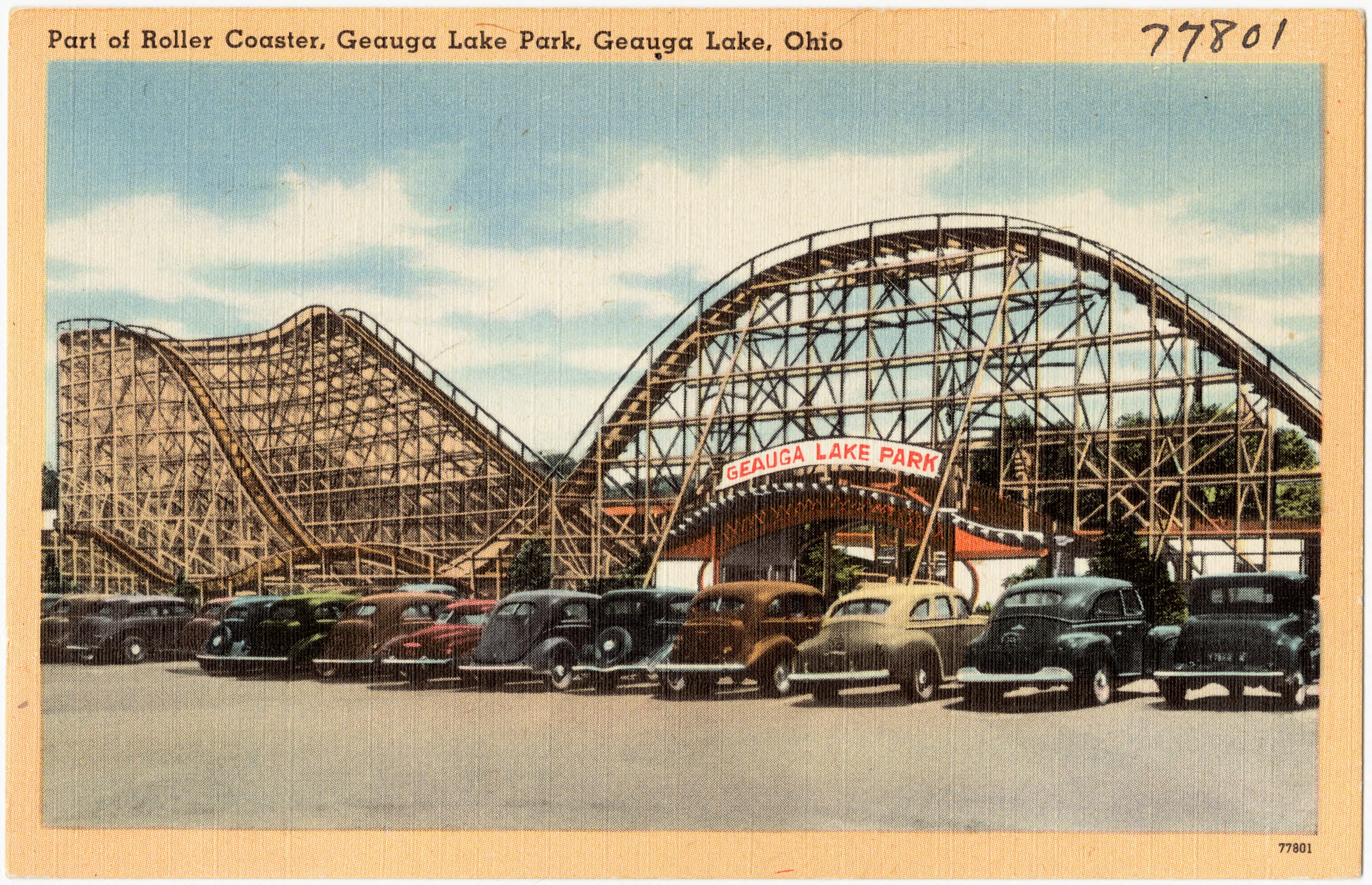
- 1940s postcard view

Geauga Lake
- Location: Geauga Lake
- Coordinates: 41.349145°N 81.377964°W
- Status: Removed
- Opening date: 1925
- Closing date: September 16, 2007
- Cost: USD$50,000

General statistics
- Type: Wood
- Designer: John A. Miller
- Model: Out and back roller coaster
- Lift/launch system: Chain lift hill
- Height: 65 ft (20 m)
- Length: 2,680 ft (820 m)
- Speed: 32 mph (51 km/h)
- Inversions: 0
- Duration: 1:45
- Height restriction: 48 in (122 cm)
- Trains: 2 trains with 4 cars; riders arranged 2 across in 3 rows for a total of 24 riders per train
- Big Dipper at RCDB

Big Dipper was a wooden roller coaster located at the defunct Geauga Lake amusement park in Bainbridge Township, Ohio, United States. Designed by renowned coaster architect John A. Miller, the ride originally opened in 1925 as Sky Rocket. It was renamed to Clipper in the late 1940s and again to Big Dipper in 1969. Built during the Golden Age of roller coasters, Big Dipper eventually became one of the last remaining roller coasters in the world designed by Miller, and was the seventh-oldest in the United States. American Coaster Enthusiasts awarded the ride its ACE Coaster Classic and ACE Coaster Landmark designations.

When Geauga Lake permanently closed in 2007, efforts to sell, preserve, and restore the historic coaster were unsuccessful. The ride was later demolished on October 17, 2016.

== History ==
For the 1925 season, Geauga Lake amusement park underwent an expansion that included the addition of Sky Rocket, a wooden roller coaster from renowned coaster designer John A. Miller. Miller designed over 140 roller coasters and contributed over 100 patented technologies to the roller coaster industry, some of which are still in use on modern-day coasters. Sky Rocket featured a height of 65 feet (20 m) and a track length of 2,680 feet (820 m). It was renamed Clipper in the late 1940s, and then again to Big Dipper in 1969 after Funtime, Inc. purchased the park.

Big Dipper underwent major renovations in 1980. The ride was retracked by Martin & Vleminckx.

=== Incidents ===
- On September 26, 1999, two trains collided. Three people received minor injuries, and only one required treatment.

=== Closure ===
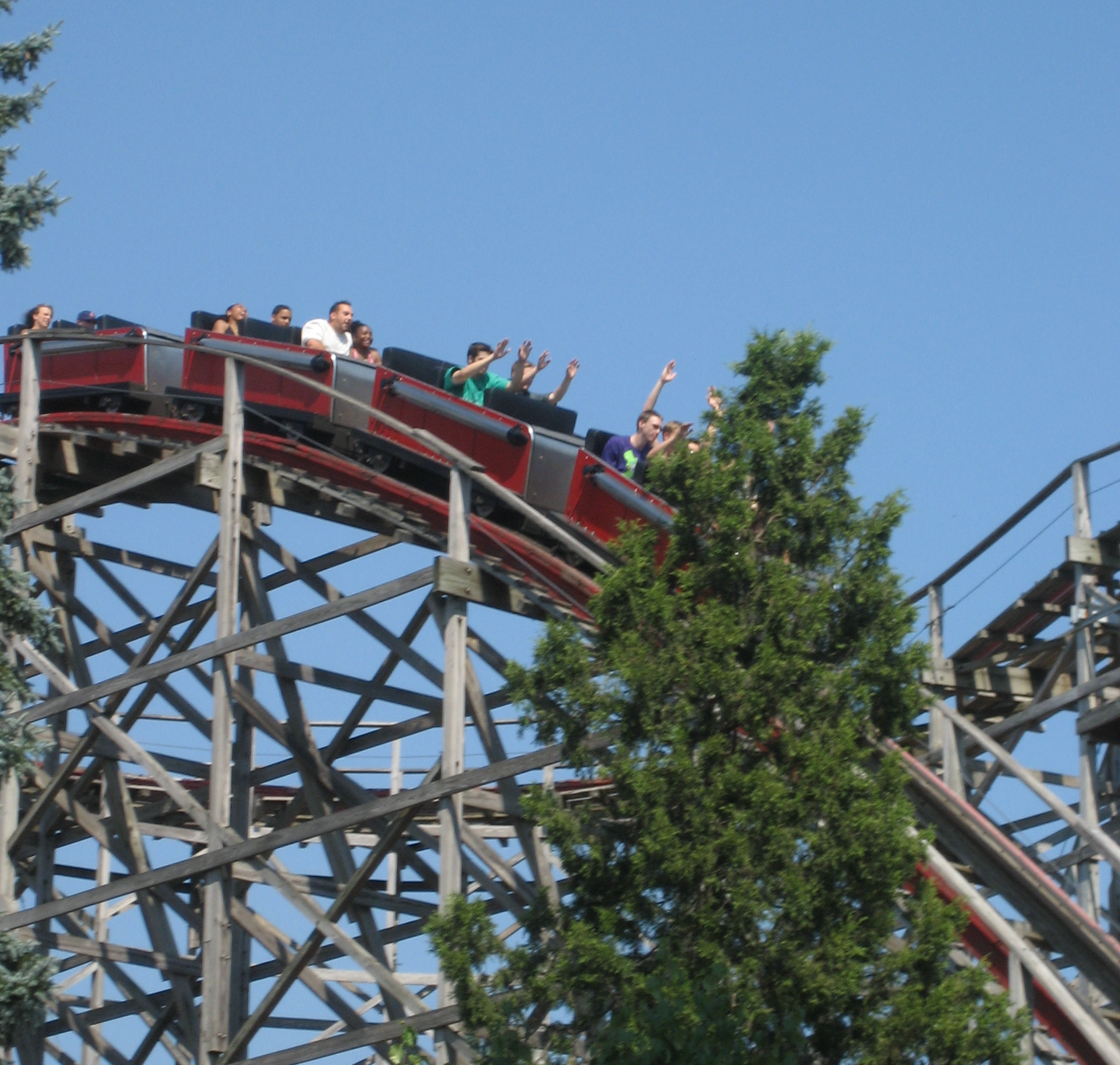
Big Dipper's train on the first hill

On September 21, 2007, Cedar Fair announced that the amusement park portion of Geauga Lake would close, leaving only the water park, Wildwater Kingdom, in operation for future years. With Big Dipper's future uncertain, preservationists and coaster enthusiasts grew concerned over its fate. The coaster first sold at an auction of the park's rides in June 2008, and minor damage to the structure was repaired in late 2008.

The Big Dipper was put up for auction again in 2010. It was listed online at eBay with a starting bid price of $9,500 and a "buy it now" price of $65,000. The auction ended without any bids on September 6, 2010. Later that month, two enthusiasts teamed up to purchase the ride, but the deal collapsed in January 2011 as a result of various legal issues surrounding the sale. They were planning to disassemble and store the coaster in an area close to the park. The roller coaster remained closed, and in September 2016, Cedar Fair announced plans to dismantle and scrap the ride. Demolition completed on October 17, 2016.
