= Dominator (roller coaster) =

Floorless roller coaster

- Previously known as Batman: Knight Flight at Six Flags Ohio/Six Flags Worlds of Adventure (2000-2003)
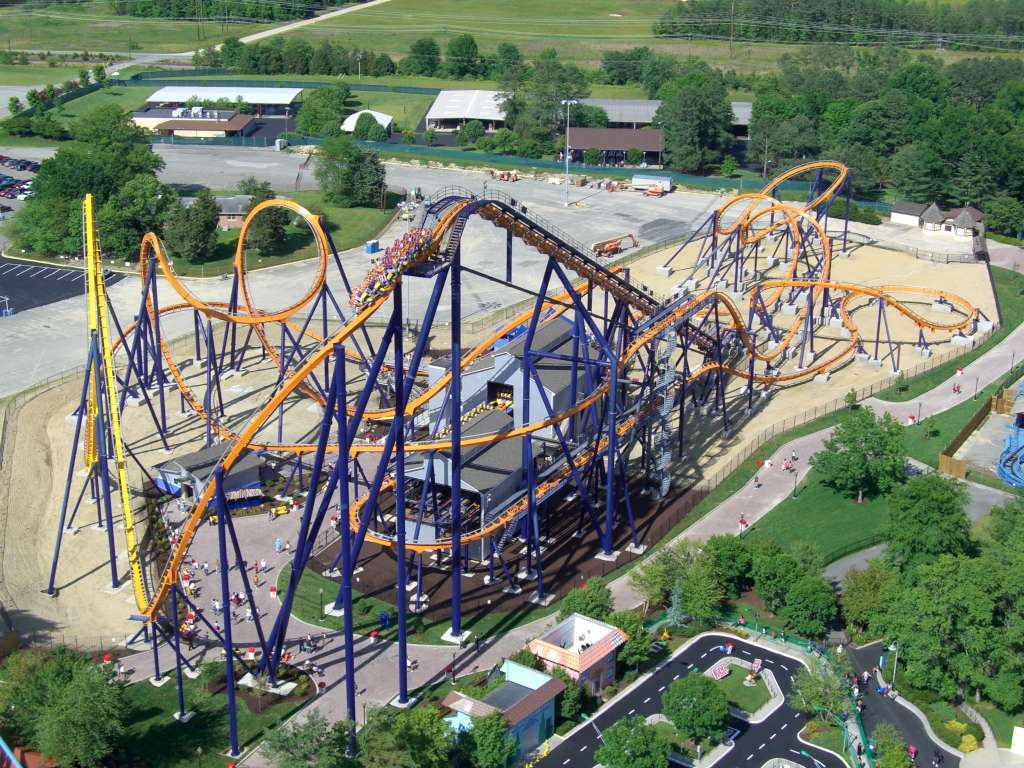
- View of Dominator from the Eiffel Tower

Kings Dominion
- Park section: International Street
- Coordinates: 37°50′27″N 77°26′36″W
- Status: Operating
- Opening date: May 24, 2008

Geauga Lake
- Park section: Power City
- Coordinates: 41.352197°N 81.374284°W
- Status: Removed
- Opening date: May 5, 2000
- Closing date: September 16, 2007
- Dominator at Geauga Lake at RCDB

General statistics
- Type: Steel – Floorless Coaster
- Manufacturer: Bolliger & Mabillard
- Designer: Werner Stengel
- Model: Floorless roller coaster
- Lift/launch system: Chain lift hill
- Height: 157 ft (48 m)
- Drop: 148 ft (45 m)
- Length: 4,210 ft (1,280 m)
- Speed: 65 mph (105 km/h)
- Inversions: 5
- Duration: 2:06
- Max vertical angle: 57°
- Capacity: 1600 riders per hour
- G-force: 3.8
- Height restriction: 54 in (137 cm)
- Trains: 3 trains with 8 cars; riders arranged 4 across in a single row for a total of 32 riders per train
- Fast Lane available
- Dominator at RCDB

Dominator is a floorless roller coaster located at Kings Dominion amusement park in Doswell, Virginia. Built by Bolliger & Mabillard, it originally opened in 2000 as Batman: Knight Flight at Six Flags Ohio (later renamed to Six Flags Worlds of Adventure in 2001), in Aurora, Ohio. It was given its current name when Cedar Fair purchased the Ohio park in 2004. However, following Six Flags Ohio (renamed back to Geauga Lake by Cedar Fair)’s eventual permanent closure in 2007, the coaster was relocated to Kings Dominion, where it reopened on May 24, 2008. Dominator is located fairly close to the park's main entry plaza, in the area known as International Street.

Dominator is the world's longest floorless coaster, at 4,210 feet (1,280 m), and it has one of the tallest vertical loops in the world at 135 ft (41 m).

== History ==
=== Geauga Lake era (2000–2007) ===
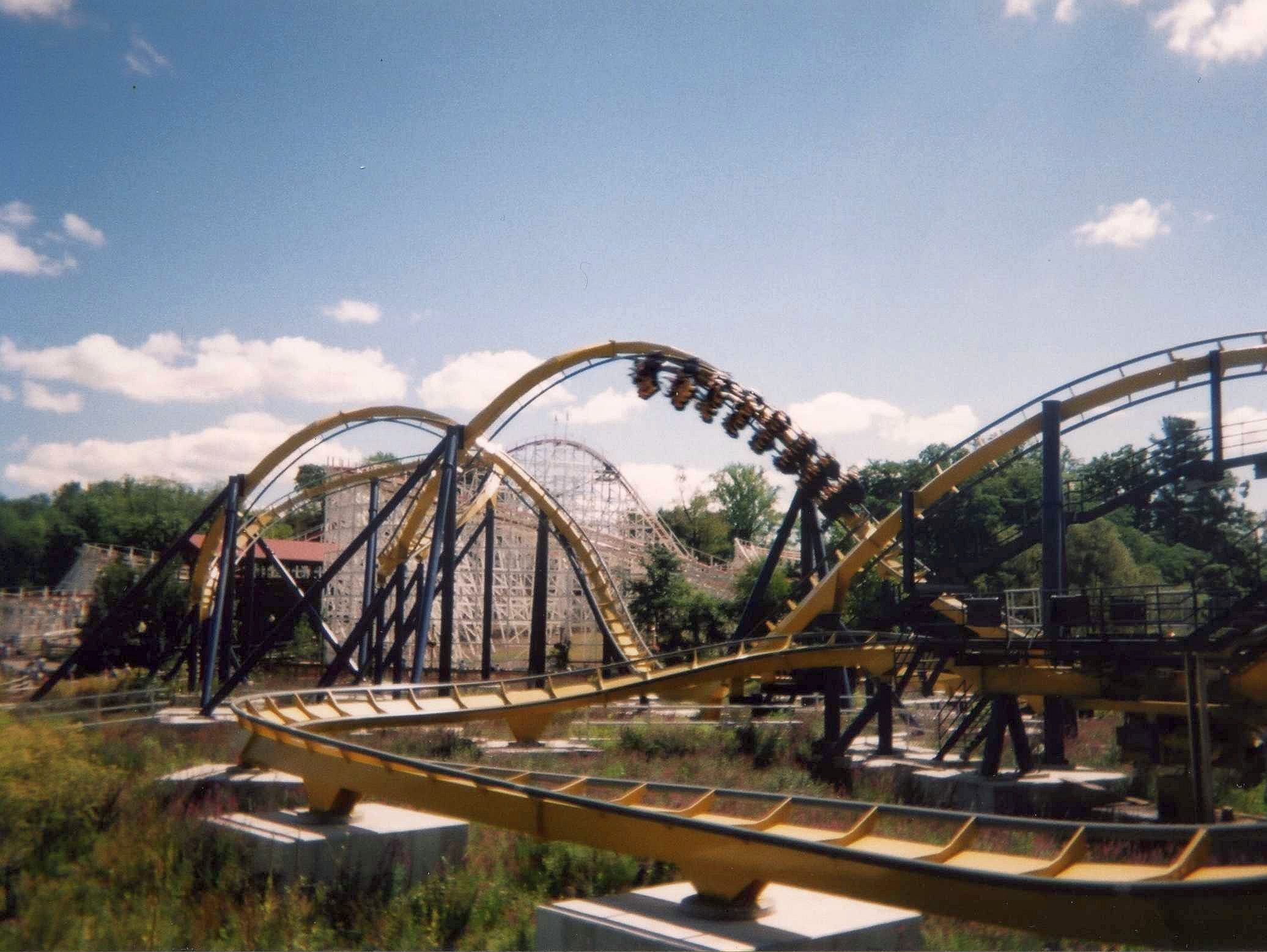
Dominator while it was known as Batman: Knight Flight

Batman: Knight Flight was unveiled at a media event held on December 9, 1999, described as the only floorless roller coaster in the Midwest and one of five like it in the world. The ride was planned as part of a major expansion project, along with extensive changes, in an effort to rebrand Geauga Lake as Six Flags Ohio for the 2000 season. Batman: Knight Flight was constructed in the Gotham City section of the park, which is a themed area common among other Six Flags parks. The coaster opened to the public on May 5, 2000. While at the park, the ride was notable for interacting with the lake numerous times throughout the course.

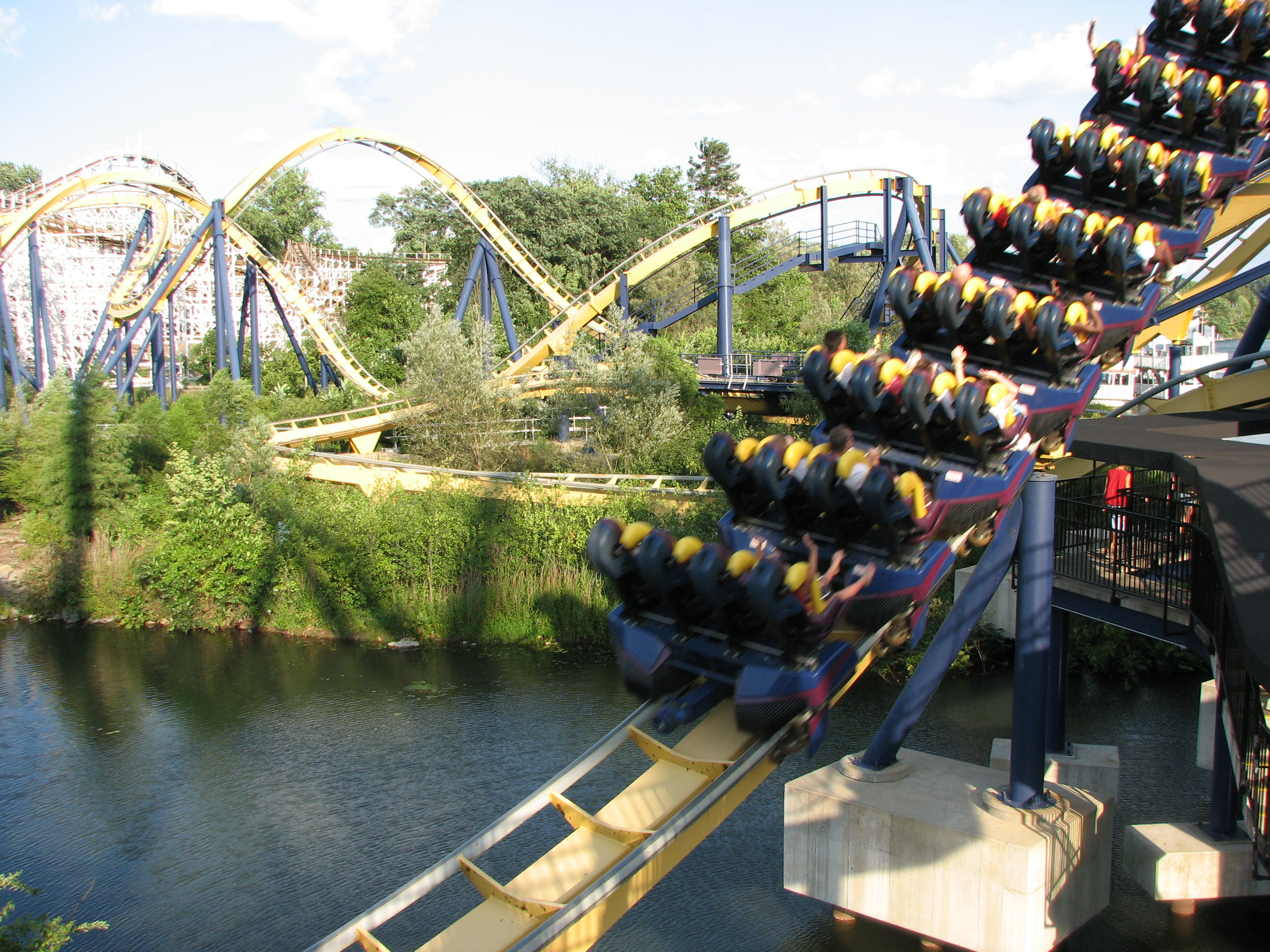
Dominator while it was at Geauga Lake

Six Flags Ohio was later renamed in 2001 to Six Flags Worlds of Adventure, and in March 2004, Cedar Fair acquired the theme park and restored the original Geauga Lake name. The park was stripped of Looney Tunes and DC Comics branding. In the process, Batman: Knight Flight was renamed Dominator, and all Batman branding was removed from the trains and station.

In August 2007, rumors of Dominator being relocated to Kings Dominion began to surface. Following Cedar Fair's announcement in September 2007 that Geauga Lake's amusement park would cease to operate, leaving only the Wildwater Kingdom water park, plans were made to relocate many of its rides to other parks. Dominator's last day of operation before the move was September 16, 2007, although its destination was not specified.

=== Kings Dominion era (2008–present) ===
On October 23, 2007, it was announced that Dominator would be moved to Kings Dominion. It was rebuilt on the former site of the bus parking lot behind the now-defunct Berserker, an Intamin Looping Starship, in the International Street section of the park. When it was relocated to Kings Dominion, it received a new paint job. The supports remained dark blue, but the track was repainted orange with the exception of the vertical loop, which remains painted yellow. It opened to the public on May 24, 2008.

== Ride experience ==
=== Layout ===
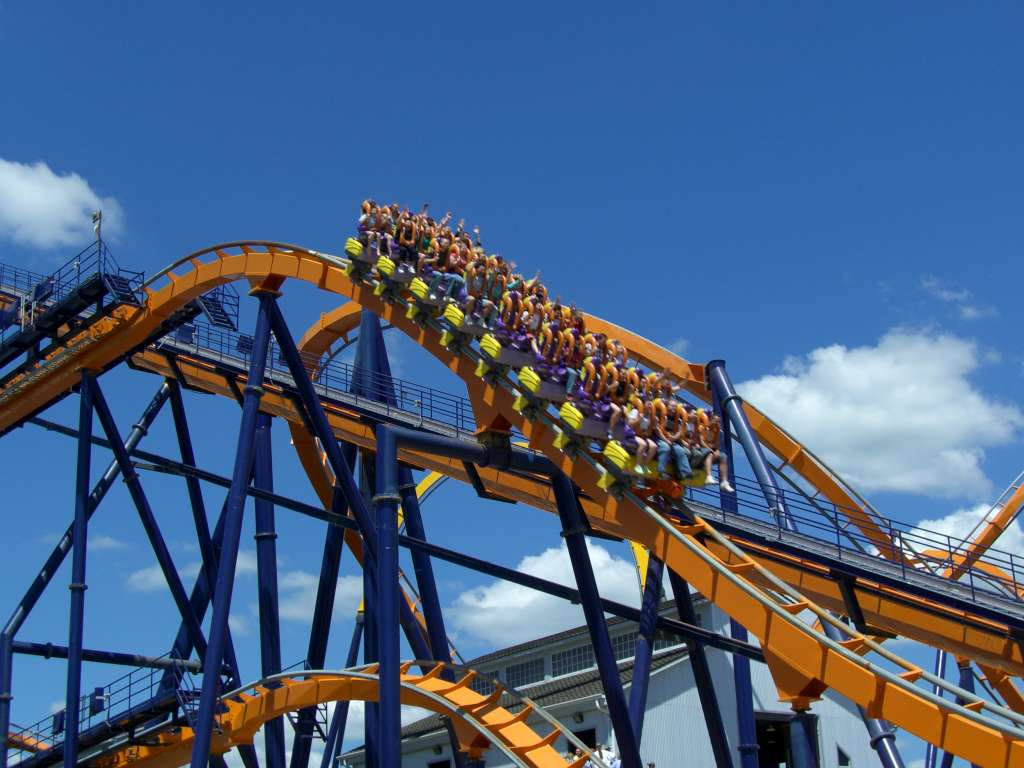
A train dropping from the mid-course brake run

After leaving the station, the train makes a small dip before making a 180-degree right turn to climb the 157-foot (48 m) tall lift hill. Once the train apexes the top of the lift, riders drop 148 feet (45 m) to the right at a 57-degree angle, reaching a maximum speed of 65 mph (105 km/h), into a 135-foot (41 m) tall vertical loop. Following the loop, riders go through an overbanked right turn (which at Geauga Lake passed over the ride entrance) and rise up into a turnaround above the station. After the turn, riders enter a cobra roll. The train then rises uphill, makes a left turn under the lift hill, and enters the mid-course brake run. After the brakes, there is a small drop into a pair of interlocking corkscrews. Following the corkscrews, the train completes a 135-degree curve to the left that dives into a 270-degree curve along the ground, entering the final brake run. One cycle of the ride lasts about 2 minutes and 6 seconds.

=== Trains ===
Dominator operates with three open-air steel-and-fiberglass trains. Each train has eight cars that have four seats in a single row for a total of 32 riders per train. Riders are secured by an over-the-shoulder restraint with a lap belt. In 2014, the seat color was changed from purple to black, and the restraint (previously all orange) added black to its color scheme.

=== Track ===
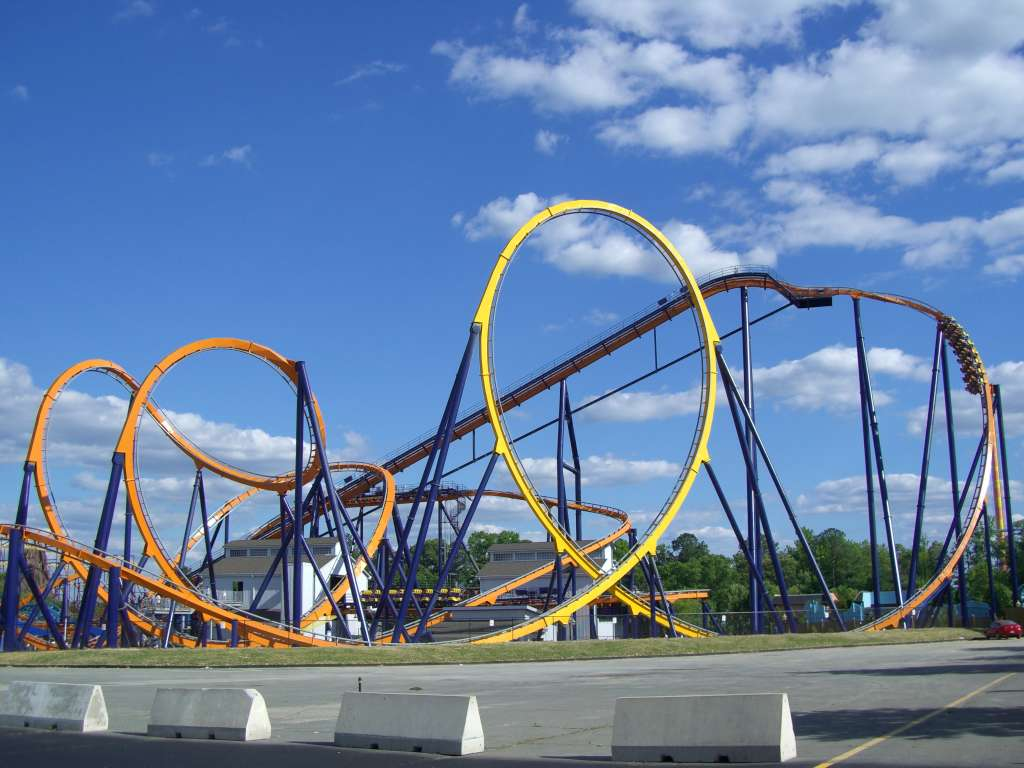
Dominator's loop and cobra roll, viewed from the parking lot

The steel track is approximately 4,210 feet (1,280 m) in length, making it the longest Floorless Coaster in the world. The height of the lift hill is approximately 161 feet (49 m). Dominator features one of the world's tallest vertical loops at 135 feet (41 m). When the coaster first opened at Geauga Lake in 2000, it was painted with blue supports, yellow track and unpainted rails. When Dominator was relocated to Kings Dominion, the supports remained blue and the rails remained unpainted. The track was painted orange but the loop remained yellow.

=== Theme ===
As Batman: Knight Flight, the coaster was the star attraction of the Gotham City themed area and featured Batman theming. When Cedar Fair bought the park in 2004 the name was changed and all Batman theming had to be removed before opening day. There has been no theme for the ride while it has been owned by Cedar Fair (which has since merged with Six Flags).

== Incidents ==
- On May 30, 2000, a 17-year-old female park employee suffered injuries after falling 10 to 12 feet (3.0 to 3.7 m) from the passenger loading area of Batman: Knight Flight.
- On July 20, 2012, a 48-year-old woman from Pitt County, North Carolina, was found unresponsive on Dominator after its train returned to the ride's station. An incident report described that she had a "seizure-like episode" after riding the roller coaster. The woman was taken to a hospital, where she died. Autopsy results revealed that she had a brain aneurysm. The ride reopened three days later, after it passed two safety inspections.
