= Geauga Lake (lake) =

- Location within Ohio
- Location: Portage County, Ohio
- Coordinates: 41°21′00″N 81°22′41″W
- Type: lake
- Basin countries: United States
- Surface area: 50 acres (20 ha)
- Surface elevation: 1,007 ft (307 m)

Geauga Lake (/dʒiˈɔːɡə/ jee-AW-gə), first known as Picnic Lake, is a natural lake located in Northeast Ohio, in the United States, on the border between the city of Aurora in Portage County and Bainbridge Township in Geauga County, near Cleveland. The Bainbridge portion is part of the Cleveland–Elyria Metropolitan Statistical Area, while the Aurora portion is part of the Akron Metropolitan Statistical Area. Both portions, however, are part of the larger Cleveland–Akron–Canton Combined Statistical Area.

== History ==
First known as Picnic Lake, the Geauga lake area was home to early settlers such as the Staffords, Mark Patterson, Capt. Simon Henry with his wife Rhoda Parsons and their children, Charles Swires, the Brewsters, and Bohan Blair. There is currently a city park and ballfields on East Blvd. in Aurora, named after this lake. Geauga Lake is situated in lot twenty-eight, tract three, and is the head water of Tinker's Creek which empties into Cuyahoga River. The waters of this lake are very pure and of great depth.

Sullivan Giles, who chose the lake area for his log cabin in 1817, later built a large frame home on the spot behind Geauga Lake depot on the north side of the lake. When the railroad came to town in 1856, it made a stop at "pond station".

Giles took advantage of the scenic lake location and established an amusement park – later known as simply Geauga Lake – in 1887, featuring picnic grounds, a dance hall, and other forms of entertainment. The park grabbed the attention of nearby residents and tourists visiting by train. Two years later, the park introduced its first amusement ride, and shortly thereafter added a roller rink, photo gallery, billiard hall and bowling alley. The bowling alley still stands and became the home of the Aurora V.F.W. The roller rink still stands and is also known as "the old ballroom". The amusement park operated until its permanent closure in 2007, although the water park that was added in 2005 – Geauga Lake's Wildwater Kingdom – continued to operate until 2016.

On a bluff on the southeast side of the lake in 1888, the 75-room Kent House Hotel (later known as Hotel Grace) was built and operated by Alexander G. Kent. He presided over one of the finest ballroom dancing facilities in the area, located on the third floor of the hotel. The hotel was later destroyed by fire in the early 20th century. The Cleveland Ice company located their buildings here, which were annually packed with many thousand tons of ice, which was primarily shipped to Cleveland for market during the warmer months.

Three professional baseball games were played at the park on Sundays (plus a Thursday exhibition game) in July and August 1888, by the Cleveland Forest Citys in the major league American Association before Sunday games were moved to Beyerle's Park closer to Cleveland in September 1888. At the time, a full-sized steamboat circled the lake, towing a large scow, topped with a dance floor. The boat, first owned by William Banford and Rowe Fuller, was later purchased by the Kents. In 1907, the boat was shipped by rail to Brady Lake near Kent.

== See also ==
- Kettle (landform)
