= Geauga Lake =

Defunct amusement park in Ohio

- Previously known as Geauga Lake (1887–2000, 2004); Six Flags Ohio (2000); Six Flags Worlds of Adventure (2001–2003); Geauga Lake & Wildwater Kingdom (2005–2007)
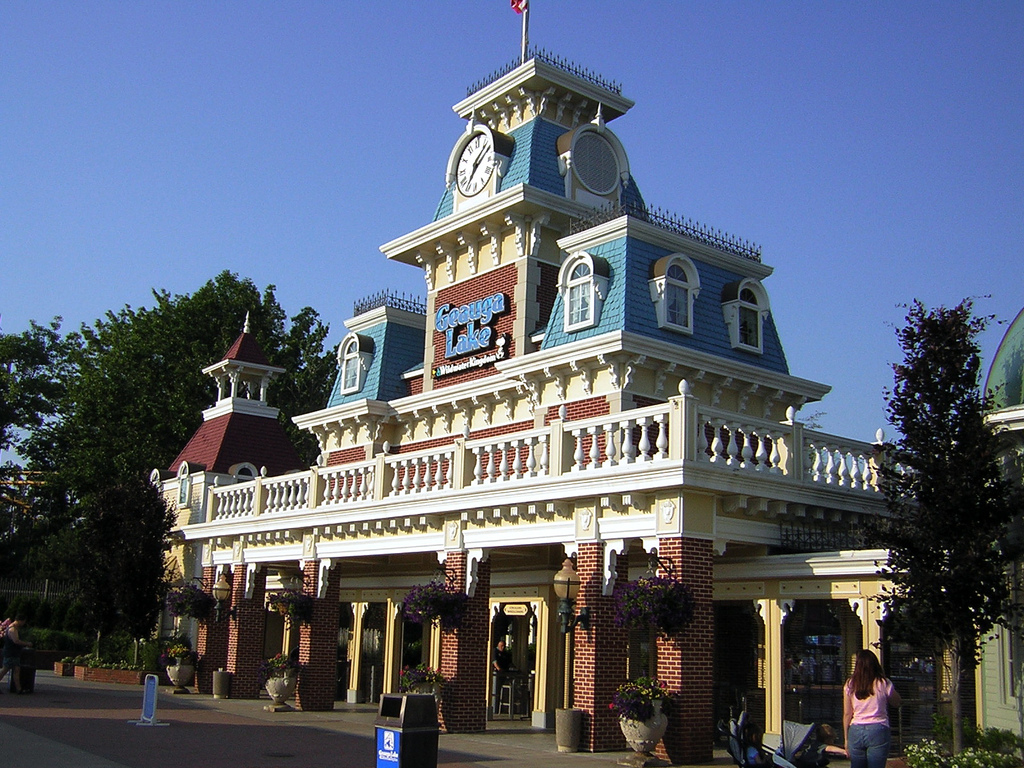
- Park entrance, 2005
- Interactive map of Geauga Lake
- Location: Bainbridge Township and Aurora, Ohio, United States
- Coordinates: 41.34839°N 81.36919°W
- Status: Defunct
- Opened: 1887; 139 years ago
- Closed: September 16, 2007; 19 years ago
- Owner: Funtime, Inc. (1969–1995); Premier Parks/Six Flags (1995–2003); Cedar Fair (2004–2007)
- Operating season: May through September
- Area: 550 acres (220 ha)

Attractions
- Total: 54
- Roller coasters: 8
- Water rides: 3
- Website: www.geaugalake.com (archived)

Geauga Lake was an amusement park in Bainbridge Township and Aurora, Ohio. It was established in 1887, in what had been a local recreation area adjacent to a lake of the same name. The first amusement ride was added in 1889, and the park's first roller coaster – the Big Dipper – was built in 1925. The park was sold to Funtime, Inc., in 1969 and was expanded over the years with additional rides and amenities. Funtime was acquired by Premier Parks in 1995, and for the 2000 season, they re-branded Geauga Lake as Six Flags Ohio, adding four new roller coasters. The following year, Six Flags bought the adjacent SeaWorld Ohio and combined the two parks under the name Six Flags Worlds of Adventure.

The park changed ownership again in 2004 after a purchase by Cedar Fair, and was renamed Geauga Lake once more. The park's SeaWorld portion was transformed into a water park in 2005, and together they became known as Geauga Lake and Wildwater Kingdom. On September 21, 2007, less than a week after Geauga Lake closed for the season, Cedar Fair announced that the amusement park would be permanently closed. The water park continued to operate as Wildwater Kingdom through the 2016 season, before being closed as well.

== History ==
=== Pre-amusement park era ===
Geauga Lake was originally known as "Picnic Lake" or "Giles Pond" after early settler Sullivan Giles. Giles built a home in the area in 1817, and later established picnic grounds, a dance hall, and other entertainment, all of which was conveniently located near a train station, which brought in many visitors.

Geauga Lake opened for picnics and swimming in 1872. An 1880 history of Geauga County reported the Giles residence "being easy of access by rail" and a "very popular place of resort during the summer months, for fishing, picnic, and excursion parties." It also noted that "for the convenience of such parties, Mr. Giles has recently erected a hall of considerable size near the lake. The surrounding grounds are kept clean and attractive, and, without exception, this is the most charming place to spend a leisure day to be found in this section." At the time, a full-sized steamboat circled the lake, towing a large scow, topped with a dance floor. In 1907, the boat was shipped by rail to Brady Lake near Kent.

=== 1887–1968: Geauga Lake amusement park ===
Geauga Lake park was established in 1887. Three Major League baseball games were played at Geauga Lake in 1888 by the Cleveland Blues of the major league American Association, specifically on Sundays to avoid Cleveland's blue laws of the time. In 1889, the park installed its first ride, a steam-powered carousel. More rides would soon follow.

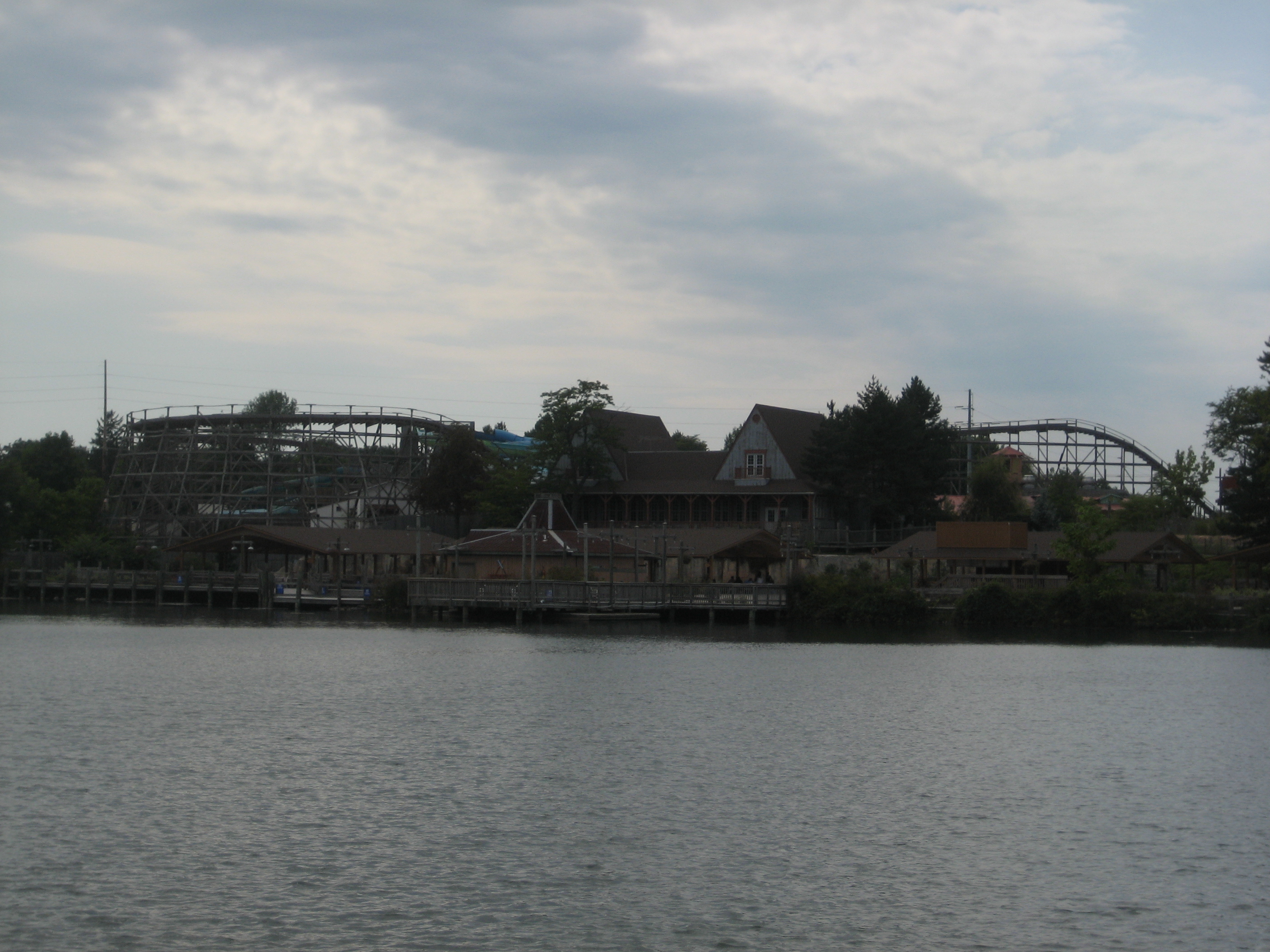
Big Dipper from across the lake

William J. Kuhlman expanded the park in 1925 and added the Big Dipper coaster and the park's Olympic-sized swimming pool, the latter of which stayed in operation until the mid-1960s. On July 11, 1926, Olympic medalist and Tarzan actor Johnny Weissmuller set a new world record in the 220-yard freestyle swim in the pool in front of 3,000 spectators. Lake swimming also continued throughout the coming decades. A race track was added in 1931. A theater, dance hall, and bowling alley were also added around the same time. The park's dance hall and ballroom were major attractions, with live music performed by Guy Lombardo, Fred Waring, Artie Shaw, and other big names of the time. In 1937, the park's hand-carved 1926 Marcus Illions carousel was installed at a cost of $35,000, after having been located in Philadelphia and Birmingham.

In 1942, a tornado hit the park, injuring six, destroying multiple buildings, and damaging the Big Dipper. The park reported $50,000 in damages, but it rebuilt. In July 1944, Viola Schryer took over management of the park after the death of her uncle William Kuhlman.

In 1952, a fire destroyed the park's bowling alley, theater, dance hall and roller rink, with damages estimated at $500,000. Due to this, the park became strictly a seasonal amusement park, beach, and swimming area. The Olympic-sized swimming pool was closed and razed in the late 1960s, but lake swimming continued. Park admission was free, and park guests paid per ride.

=== 1969–1999: Funtime era ===
In 1969, Funtime Incorporated purchased the park. The park's focus continued to be on rides and swimming. The race track closed in 1969. In 1970, a marine life park, SeaWorld Ohio, was built across the lake from the amusement park.

In 1972, the Gold Rush log flume water ride was added, and two years later Geauga Lake added the Skyscraper, which took passengers up 21 stories for views of the park. In 1973, the park converted to an admission charge with a pay-one-price for all the rides and attractions. The Geauga Dog became the park's mascot and would remain so until 1999. In 1976, the park added the Wildcat compact steel roller coaster, and a year later the park added the Double Loop, a looping steel coaster.

The Corkscrew coaster made its debut in 1978, making Geauga Lake the first amusement park in Ohio to have two looping coasters. Swimming in the lake continued to be popular at the park, so in 1983, the park added Boardwalk Shores, which featured a paddleboat marina, a new bath house, a children's swimming pool area, and water slides. A year later, The Wave, the first tsunami wave pool in the Midwest, opened.

In 1985, Harcourt Brace Jovanovich, owner of SeaWorld, announced his intent to purchase Funtime and combine the two parks, but the deal was never completed. In 1986, more children's rides were added to a themed area known as Rainbow Island. Stingray water slides and the Euroracer Grand Prix rides were also added.

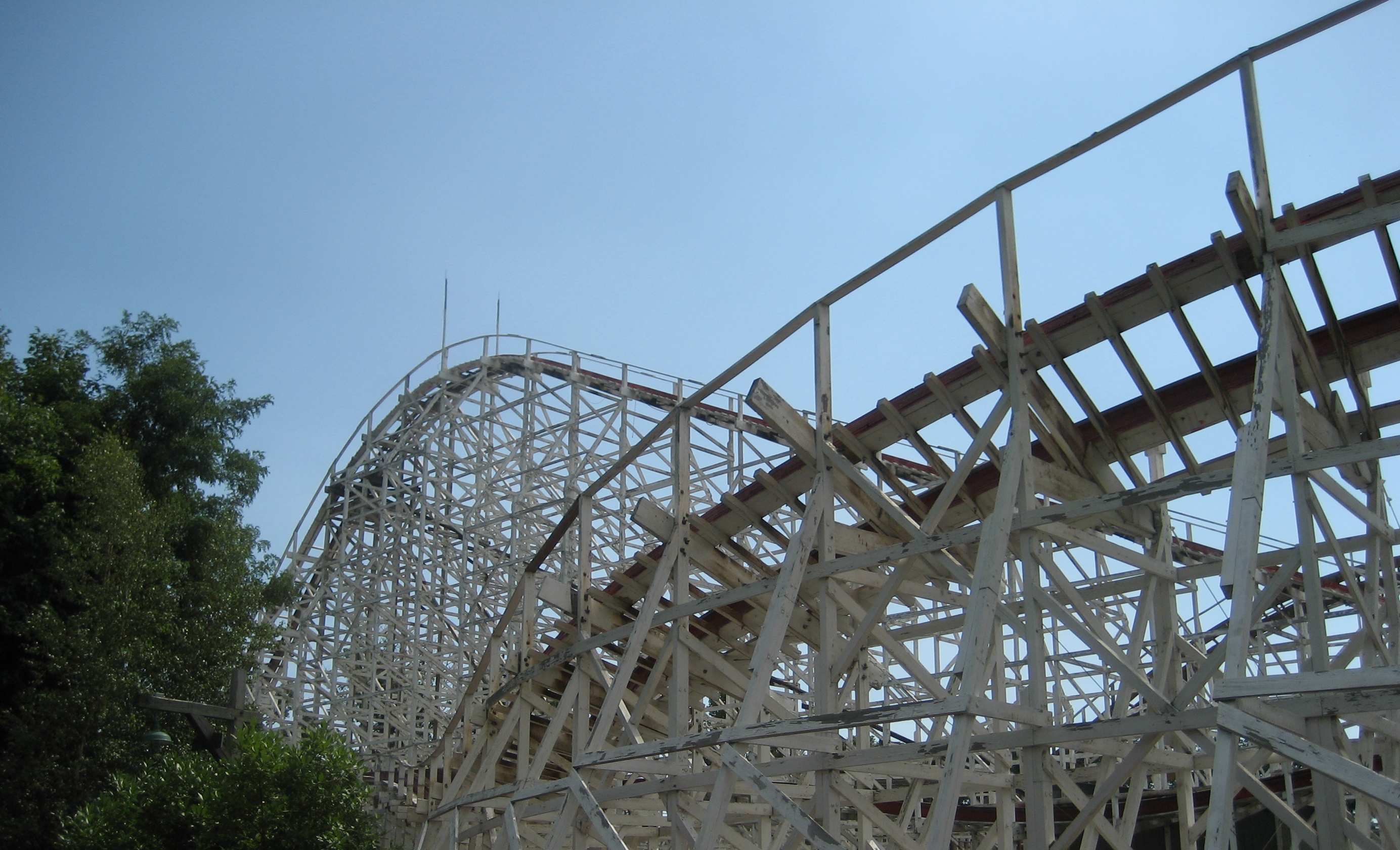
Raging Wolf Bobs, added in 1988, was added to celebrate the park's centennial anniversary.

In 1988, Geauga Lake celebrated its centennial by introducing the Raging Wolf Bobs, a wooden roller coaster with a hybrid twister/out and back design modeled after the original Bobs roller coaster at Chicago's defunct Riverview Park. Two years later, the park re-themed the children's water area as Turtle Beach, which was advertised as the ultimate children's water playground. Geauga Lake expanded its midway with The Mirage and the $2.1 million Texas Twister in the early 1990s.

A corporate deal in 1995 saw Premier Parks acquiring Funtime, giving Geauga Lake a new owner. Premier Parks invested $9 million in new rides, including the Mind Eraser, a steel looping shuttle coaster designed by Vekoma, and Grizzly Run, a water rapids ride designed by Intamin. These attractions opened in 1996, and Corkscrew was closed and sold and moved to Dizzee World in India the same year. The next year, the park expanded its water area by 32,000 square feet (3,000 m^{2}) with Hook's Lagoon. Several new water slides were also added. Mr. Hyde's Nasty Fall, an Intamin first generation freefall ride was also added in 1997.

In 1998, Premier Parks purchased Six Flags from Time Warner. Serial Thriller, an inverted coaster later known as Thunderhawk, was added as well. The next year, Americana, Time Warp, and Skycoaster were added.

=== 2000–2003: Six Flags era ===
The logo when it was known as Six Flags Worlds of Adventure

In 2000, Geauga Lake received a $40 million expansion and became Six Flags Ohio. As part of that expansion, the park received 20 new rides, including four new roller coasters: a junior coaster called Road Runner Express, a wooden coaster called Villain, a floorless coaster called Batman: Knight Flight and an inverted impulse coaster called Superman: Ultimate Escape. Also added was a new shoot the chute water ride named Shipwreck Falls and a new wave pool in the water park. The old wave pool was filled, and used for a new Looney Tunes themed kids' area known as Looney Tunes Boomtown.

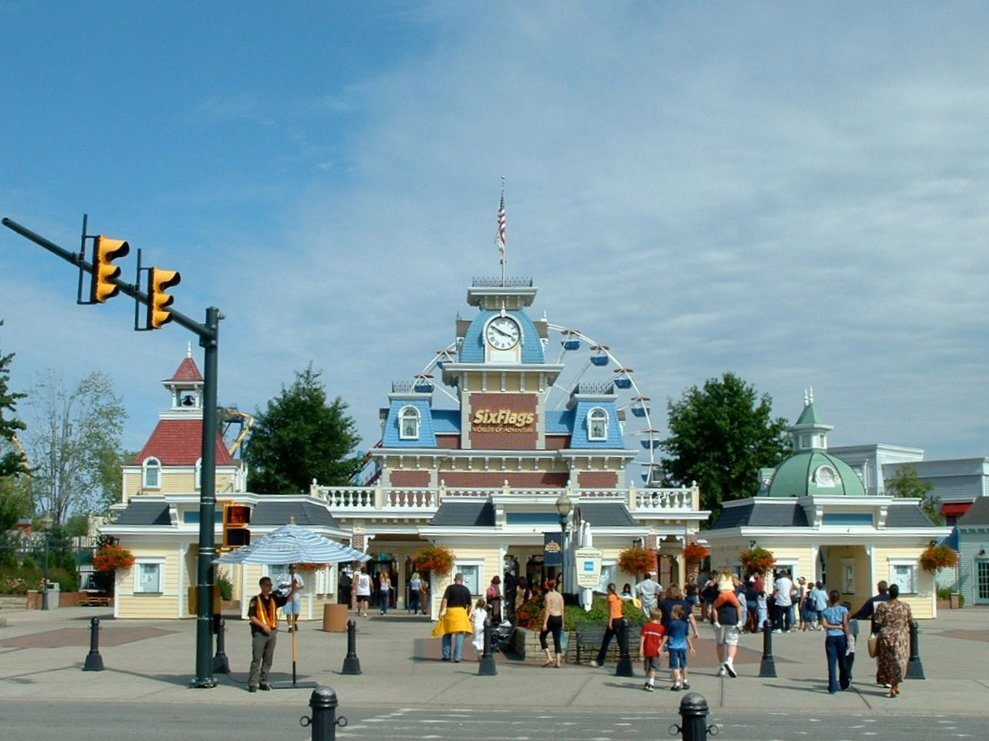
The entrance to Six Flags Worlds of Adventure in 2003

Around this time, Busch Entertainment determined that its SeaWorld parks should feature roller coasters, water rides, and other attractions to supplement the marine displays and shows, and the company began de-emphasizing the educational aspects of its parks. Due to Six Flags Ohio's close proximity to SeaWorld Ohio, Busch approached Six Flags about buying the Six Flags park. Six Flags then made a counter offer to instead buy SeaWorld Ohio. That winter, Six Flags purchased SeaWorld Ohio for $110 million in cash, merging the two complexes into one, and changing the entire complex's name to Six Flags Worlds of Adventure. By combining the parks, Six Flags created the largest theme park in the world to date, at 700 acres. The SeaWorld side became known as the "Wild Life" area and remained primarily marine life shows, with a few portable children's rides placed throughout. In 2001, the park planned to construct a 200-foot tall coaster on the SeaWorld side of the park, but later abandoned those plans due to height restrictions and other conflicts with the city of Aurora. The original amusement park area became known as the "Wild Rides" area and continued expansion with a Vekoma flying coaster called X-Flight. The original water park area also continued, so the park was marketed as "three parks for one price." In hopes to expand the water park, the addition of Hurricane Mountain, the then-largest water slide complex in North America, occurred in 2003, and the water park area was later renamed Hurricane Harbor.

=== 2004–2007: Cedar Fair era ===
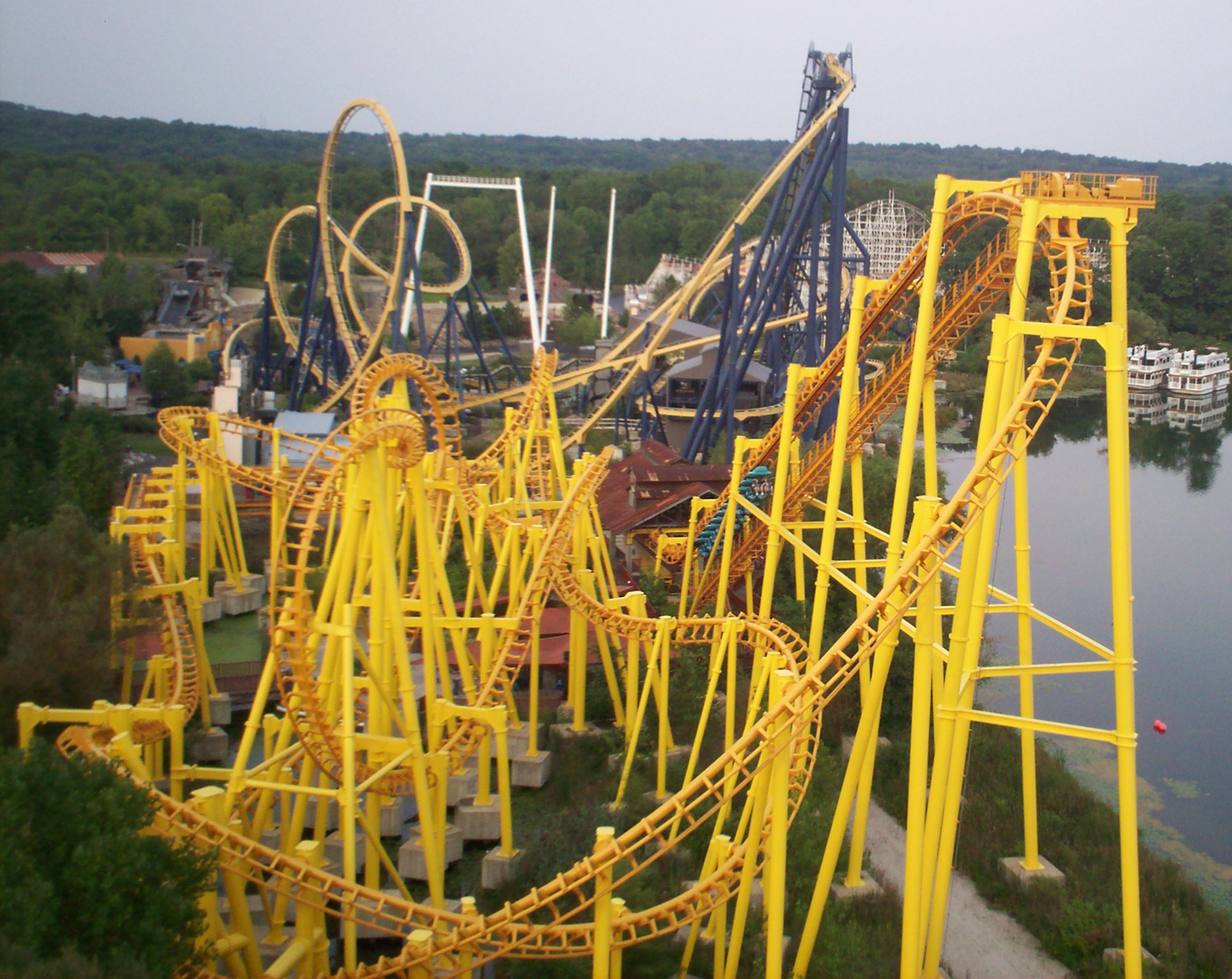
View of Thunderhawk (yellow), Dominator (blue), and Raging Wolf Bobs (white) with the ferry boats (then unused) in the background in 2006

Facing financial difficulties across its chain, Six Flags considered selling the park. In March 2004, two months before the start of the season, a sale to Cedar Fair was announced. The deal was finalized less than a month later for $145 million. The Geauga Lake name was promptly restored to the park. To conform with copyright and trademark laws, all Looney Tunes and DC Comics branding was removed from the park. The Looney Tunes Boomtown kids' area was renamed Kidworks. The Hurricane Harbor water park area was renamed Hurricane Hannah's Waterpark. The marine life portion of the park was closed and demolished, and the animals were relocated to other Six Flags parks, including Six Flags Marine World and Six Flags Great Adventure.

Examples of name changes that took place include:

- Batman: Knight Flight lost the Batman theming and opened in 2004 under the name of Dominator
- Mind Eraser was renamed Head Spin
- Serial Thriller was renamed Thunderhawk
- Superman: Ultimate Escape was renamed Steel Venom
- Road Runner Express was renamed Beaver Land Mine Ride

In 2005, Cedar Fair invested $26 million in Wildwater Kingdom, a new water park on the former SeaWorld site, which resulted in the park's name being changed to Geauga Lake & Wildwater Kingdom. The Wildwater Kingdom side had six water slides and a children's water play area. The Hurricane Hannah area remained. Mr. Hyde's Nasty Fall was closed at the end of 2005. Usable parts were salvaged for Demon Drop, then located at Cedar Point.

In 2006, Wildwater Kingdom was expanded to include Tidal Wave Bay. The Hurricane Hannah area was then shut down. The season was also scaled back, eliminating the spring and fall weekend operations, instead operating strictly between Memorial Day and Labor Day. At the end of the season, X-Flight and Steel Venom were removed. X-Flight was relocated to Kings Island and opened as Firehawk in 2007. Steel Venom was relocated to Dorney Park, where it opened for the 2008 season as Voodoo, and was later renamed Possessed.

=== Decline ===
Combined attendance at both parks reached an estimated 2.7 million visitors in 2001. By 2004, total park attendance had fallen to approximately 700,000 despite a $40 million investment on rides in 2000. Citing the Cleveland area as their "most difficult market," Six Flags sold the park to Cedar Fair in March 2004. Among reasons for the park's decline in the early 2000s were an impacted tourism industry post-September 11, staffing issues, and low guest satisfaction. Speculation that the amusement park side would eventually close began after Cedar Fair relocated two major roller coasters, Steel Venom and X-Flight, to other parks prior to the 2007 season.

=== Closing and land redevelopment ===
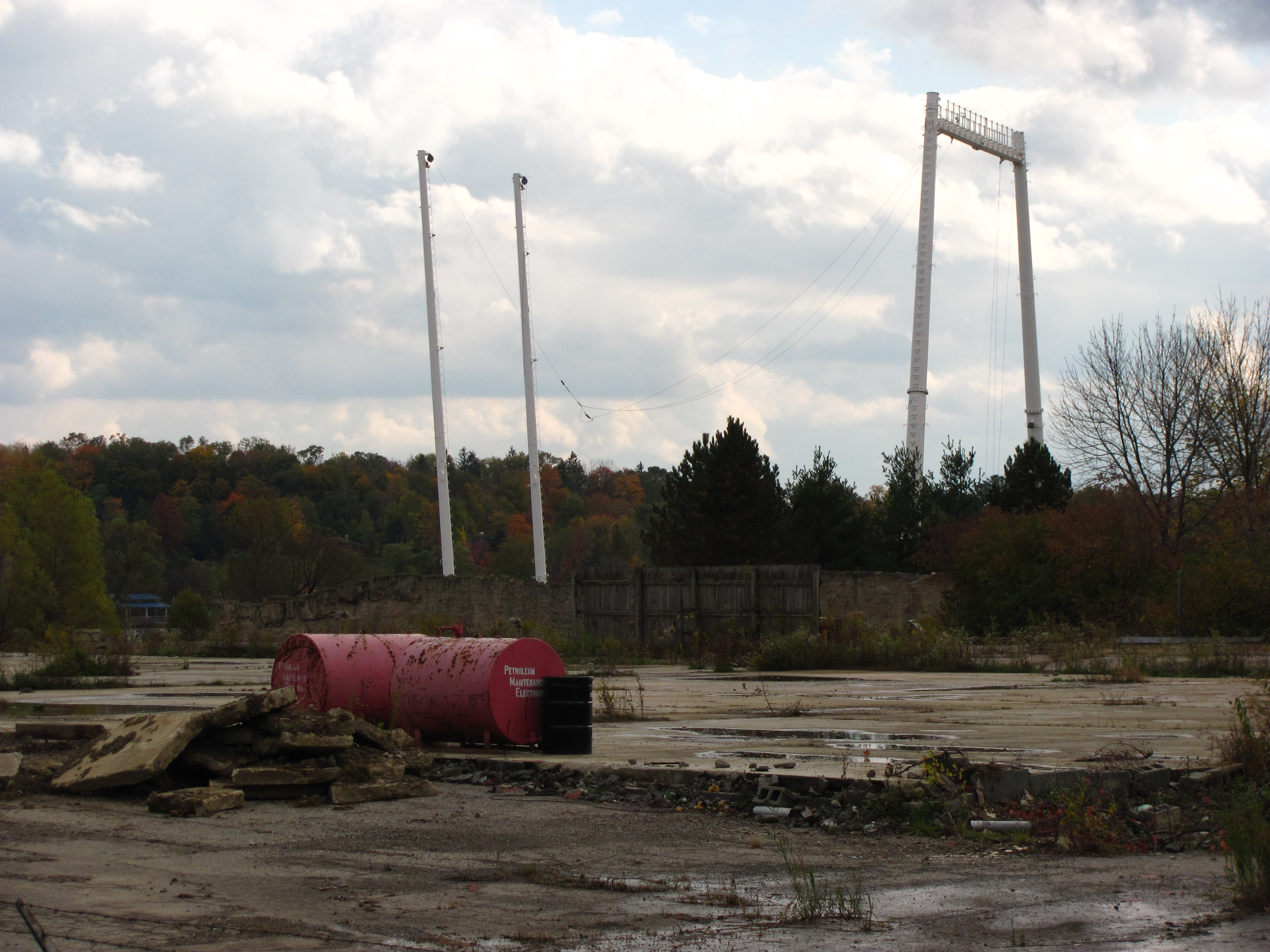
One of the last standing rides, Ripcord, pictured in 2011

In 2007, the summer-only operation of Geauga Lake continued. The annual Oktoberfest festival weekend held in September every year concluded on September 16, 2007, marking the amusement park's last day of operation. On September 21, 2007, Cedar Fair announced that the ride side of Geauga Lake would permanently close, and that the water park side would continue to operate the following season as Geauga Lake's Wildwater Kingdom. At the time, the park was still facing financial issues and its attendance levels had declined. Cedar Fair also announced plans to move existing rides to other properties. This led to efforts from locals to save Geauga Lake, especially landmark rides such as the Big Dipper and the Carousel.

Cedar Fair placed the amusement park side's land up for sale in 2008. The remaining rides and remnants were auctioned separately on June 17, 2008.

In 2012 and 2013, Cleveland-based photographer and artist Johnny Joo visited Geauga Lake to capture the park in a state of decay. These photos brought heavy local attention from families who had visited the park in its heyday.

As late as January 2013, the amusement park side was still for sale, and projects similar to Crocker Park in Westlake, Ohio were being considered. Bainbridge Township and Cedar Fair hoped to have it resolved by the end of 2013. In March 2013, Cedar Fair announced that they were putting Geauga Lake's property up for sale again. Unlike before, they were willing to sell the land in parcels. Several companies showed interest in the land. On September 17, 2017, a plaque was unveiled in memory of the park.

On August 25, 2020, it was announced that PulteGroup, a home construction company, would be building a housing development on the site of the Wildwater Kingdom parking lot. PulteGroup acquired the 245 acre portion of the property for $2 million. The development, known as Renaissance Park at Geauga Lake, included street names like "Carousel Court" and "Dipper Way" to pay tribute to former Geauga Lake attractions. In October 2020, developer Industrial Commercial Properties bought the remaining 377 acres of the property with plans to build homes, restaurants, and retail establishments.

On September 17, 2024, Aurora City Council unanimously voted to purchase 48 acres of land, along with the adjacent lake, from Industrial Commercial Properties. The land was acquired for a total of $5.3 million, including $1.3 million of stimulus money from the American Rescue Plan Act of 2021. The city of Aurora planned to develop this property as a public park, including amenities like a beach, pool, and a place for boating. The city council had announced their plans in spring 2023. Plans for 2025 included construction of a Meijer supercenter as well as the park. The Meijer opened on May 6, 2026, and the park, Aurora Park at Geauga Lake, had its grand opening on October 25, 2026.

== Fate of Geauga Lake's coasters ==
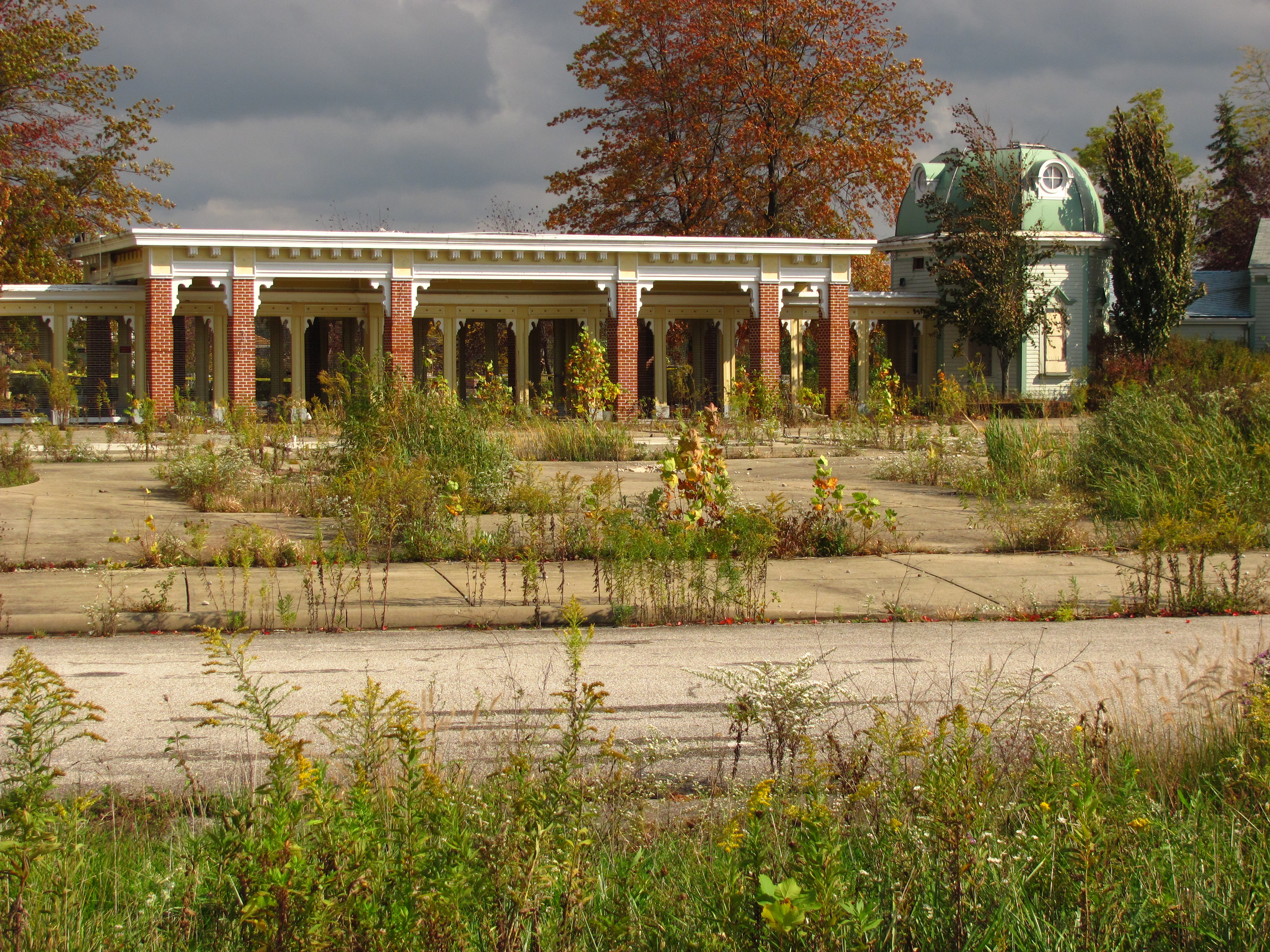
What was left of the Geauga Lake entrance as pictured in 2011

- Beaver Land Mine Ride: Sold to Papéa Parc amusement park in Yvré-l'Evêque, France and renamed "The Roller Coaster".
- Big Dipper: The roller coaster was listed for auction on eBay in 2010 but failed to receive a bid; it was demolished in October 2016.
- Dominator: Relocated to Kings Dominion.
- Double Loop: Demolished and sold to Cleveland Scrap for $25,000.
- Head Spin: Relocated to Carowinds and renamed "The Flying Cobras".
- Cyclone: Moved to Holiday World and renamed "Firecracker" in 1980. In 1998 it was moved to Jolly Roger Amusement Park under the same name. In 1999 it was purchased by Amusements of America, and renamed Avalanche. It remained in operation until 2009.
- Little Dipper: Removed in 1975.
- Raging Wolf Bobs: Demolished. Purchased for $2,500 at auction; some wood and track sold in online auctions; steel track, station, and all mechanical elements removed in 2008; part of track and car donated to Geauga County Historical Society. Two of the original red Philadelphia Toboggan Coasters cars were acquired in 2017 by the Amusement Preservation Museum, and have been fully restored.
- Steel Venom: Relocated to Dorney Park & Wildwater Kingdom as Possessed.
- Thunderhawk: Relocated to Michigan's Adventure.
- Villain: Demolished, sold to Cleveland Scrap for $2,500.
- Wild Mouse: Relocated in 1972 to Chippewa Lake Park. It closed in 1978 alongside the park, and it was eventually torn down in 2013.
- X-Flight: Relocated in March 2007 to Kings Island and renamed "Firehawk". It closed on October 28, 2018. It was demolished and removed from Kings Island after the 2018 season.

== Past coasters and attractions ==
Below are some of the park's former rides that have been removed or are now operating at another amusement park.

=== Roller coasters ===
Ride	Manufacturer	Model	Year opened	Year closed	Description
Big Dipper	John A. Miller	Wooden coaster	1925	2007	The ride stood by the former park entrance gate. It has also been known as The Clipper and Sky Rocket. It was demolished in 2016.
Wild Mouse	B.A. Schiff & Associates	Steel Wild Mouse coaster	1958	1971	Relocated to Chippewa Lake Park in 1972 and closed in 1978. It was torn down in 2013.
Little Dipper	National Amusement Devices	Wooden coaster	1952	1975	
Cyclone	Pinfari	Steel Zyklon Z47 coaster	1976	1980	Moved to Holiday World & Splashin Safari from 1981 to 1997, and to Jolly Roger Amusement Park in 1998, and was known as Firecracker at both parks. Sold to Amusements of America in 1999 and made several fairground appearances as Cyclone until 2009.
Double Loop	Arrow Dynamics	Steel coaster	1977	2007	Demolished and sold for scrap
Corkscrew	Arrow Dynamics	Steel coaster	1978	1995	Relocated to MGM Dizzee World and renamed "Roller Coaster" in 1995
Raging Wolf Bobs	Dinn Corporation	Wooden coaster	1988	2007	Closed on June 16, 2007 due to a train derailment. Demolished between 2011 and 2014.
Head Spin	Vekoma	Steel Boomerang coaster	1996	2007	Formerly known as The Mind Eraser, now operating at Carowinds as The Flying Cobras
Thunderhawk	Vekoma	Steel inverted coaster	1998	2007	Formerly known as Serial Thriller, now operating at Michigan's Adventure
Beaver Land Mine Ride	Zierer	Steel kiddie coaster	2000	2007	Formerly known as Road Runner Express, now operating at Papéa Parc as Roller Coaster
Dominator	Bolliger & Mabillard	Steel floorless coaster	2000	2007	Formerly known as Batman: Knight Flight, now operating at Kings Dominion
Steel Venom	Intamin	Steel Impulse coaster	2000	2006	Formerly known as Superman: Ultimate Escape, now operating at Dorney Park & Wildwater Kingdom as Possessed
Villain	Custom Coasters International	Hybrid wooden coaster	2000	2007	Demolished
X-Flight	Vekoma	Flying Dutchman	2001	2006	Relocated to Kings Island as Firehawk. Closed and demolished in 2018 to make room for Orion.

=== Other attractions ===
Ride	Year opened	Year closed	Description
Americana	1999	2007	Ferris wheel. Moved from Old Indiana Fun Park in 1997, opened at Kings Dominion in 2009.
Bayern Kurve	1974	1981	Schwarzkopf Bayern Kurve
Bel-Aire Express	1969	2006	Monorail
Big Ditch	1973	1985	Boat ride
Black Squid	1970	2007	Eyerly Aircraft Company Spider. Relocated to Kings Dominion, but was in too poor of condition to be reassembled.
Boardwalk Typhoon	Unknown	2007	Eli Bridge Company Scrambler. Sold to Schlitterbahn.
Bounty	2001	2007	Chance Rides swinging ship. Sold to Schlitterbahn.
Bug	Unknown	1977	Traver Tumble Bug
Calypso	1975	1986	Ramagosa Calypso
Carousel	1937	2007	Marcus Illions carousel. Relocated to Worlds of Fun in 2011.
Casino	1991	1999	Chance Rides Casino
Dodgems	1983	2007	Bumper cars
El Dorado	1991	2007	Weber 1001 Nachts ride. Moved to Kings Dominion in 2009, and closed in 2011 to make room for WindSeeker.
Euroracers Grand Prix	1987	1999	Go-karts
Ferris Wheel	1969	1998	Eli Bridge Company Ferris wheel
Ferry Boats	2001	2005	Two ferry boats operated as Cuyahoga Queen and Aurora Belle
Fly-O-Planes	1952	1985	Eyerly Aircraft Company Fly-O-Planes
Flying Scooters	1958	1999	Bisch-Rocco Flying Scooters
Geauga Lake Stadium	1975	2007	Lakeside stadium originally built to host SeaWorld's water-ski shows
Geauga Queen	Unknown	1980	Boat ride
Giant Slide	Unknown	1980	Sack slide
Grizzly Run	1996	2007	Intamin river rapids ride
Harbor Theatre	1998	2007	4D cinema
Hay Baler	1976	2007	Mack Rides Matterhorn
LEGO Racers 4-D	2007	2007	4D cinema film
Lighthouse Cruise	1985	2000	Boat ride
Merry Oldies	1972	2007	Arrow Dynamics Antique Cars
Mission: Bermuda Triangle	2000	2004	Simulator film
Mr. Hyde's Nasty Fall	1997	2005	Intamin Freefall ride. Scrapped and parts salvaged for Demon Drop.
Muzik Express	1978	2002	Music Express ride
Palace Theatre	1977	2007	Entertainment venue which was previously a funhouse from the 1940s through 1976
Pepsi Plunge	1972	2007	Log flume, formerly known as Gold Rush
Pirates 4-D Adventure	1998	2004	4D cinema film
Pirates Flight	2002	2007	Zamperla Balloon Race with pirate theme
Power City Stage	1993	2007	Amphitheatre formerly known as Gotham City Stage
Ripcord	1999	2007	Skycoaster Company Skycoaster
Robots of Mars	2005	2006	4D cinema film replaced by LEGO Racers 4-D
Rock-O-Planes	1953	1982	Eyerly Aircraft Company Rock-O-Plane
Roll-O-Planes	Early 1950s	Mid-1970s	Eyerly Aircraft Company Roll-O-Plane
Rotor	1981	2000	Rotor ride
Shipwreck Falls	2000	2007	Shoot the chute water ride. Relocated to Celebration City in 2008, and closed the same year.
Silver Bullet	1976	2003	HUSS Park Attractions Enterprise ride
Skyscraper	1974	2007	Observation tower, eventually dismantled
Starfish	2003	2007	Spinning family ride
Texas Twister	1993	2007	The first HUSS Park Attractions Top Spin in the United States. It was relocated to California's Great America as Firefall in 2008. It was removed in 2016.
Thunder Alley Speedway	1998	2007	Go-karts
Time Warp	1999	2007	Chance Rides Inverter
Yo-Yo	1981	2007	Chance Rides Yo-Yo. Was operational at Carowinds from 2008 to 2022.
Tilt-A-Whirl	Unknown	1999	Operated at Zoombezi Bay from 2000 to 2017, relocated to Funtimes Fun Park in 2018.

=== Looney Tunes Boomtown/Kidworks Playzone ===
The section initially opened in 2000 as Looney Tunes Boomtown. It was renamed to Kidworks Playzone upon acquisition by Cedar Fair until its closure in 2007. All of these rides have since been relocated to Cedar Point's Planet Snoopy section.

Six Flags name	Cedar Fair name	Cedar Point name	Description
Taz's Twister	Mad Whirl	Woodstock Whirlybirds	Zamperla Mini Tea Cups
Daffy's Deep Diver	Dippy Divers	Snoopy's Deep Sea Divers	Zamperla Crazy Bus
Tweety's Club House	Tree Hopper	Kite Eating Tree	Zamperla Jumpin' Star
Wile E. Coyote Canyon Blaster	Hot Air Express	Flying Ace Balloon Race	Zamperla Samba Balloon Race
Yosemite Sam BoomTown Express	Half Pint Express	Snoopy's Express Railroad	Zamperla Rio Grande Train
Speedy Gonzales' Trucking Company	Road Rally	PEANUTS Road Rally	Zamperla Convoy
Marvin the Martian Rocket Ship Ride	Rocket Relay	Snoopy's Space Race	Zamperla Junior Jets

=== Hurricane Harbor ===
Ride	Year opened	Year closed	Description
Shark Attack	2003	2005	3 raft slides
Hurricane Mountain	2003	2005	America's largest water slide complex at the time
Stingray Wet Slides	1987	2005	Speed slides
Neptune Falls	1982	2005	3 body slides
Hook's Lagoon	1997	2005	Water tree house
Turtle Beach	1989	2005	Kids play area
The Rampage	1982	1996	Water tobbogan; replaced by Hook's Lagoon
Hurricane Bay	2000	2005	Wave pool
Calypso Creek	2000	2005	Lazy river
The Wave	1984	1999	Wave pool; removed to make way for Looney Tunes Boomtown

== Previous names and management ==
The park was originally two parks: Geauga Lake and SeaWorld Ohio. Geauga Lake became Six Flags Ohio in 2000 and for the 2001 season, SeaWorld Ohio was purchased by Six Flags and the entire complex was combined and renamed Six Flags Worlds of Adventure.

	Amusement park			Marine park		
Year	Name	Owner	Manager	Name	Owner	Manager
1872	Giles Pond / Picnic Lake	Sullivan Giles		N/A		
1888	Geauga Lake	Alexander G. Kent		N/A		
1925	Geauga Lake	William J. Kuhlman		N/A		
1945	Geauga Lake	Carl Adrion, Harvey Schryer, & Charles Schryer		N/A		
1968	Geauga Lake	Funtime, Inc.	Gaspar Lococo, Earl Gascoigne, Dale Van Voorhis, & Milford Jacobson	N/A		
1970	Geauga Lake	Funtime, Inc.	Gaspar Lococo, Earl Gascoigne, Dale Van Voorhis, & Milford Jacobson	SeaWorld Ohio	SeaWorld	Milton C. Shedd, Ken Norris, David Dement, and George Millay
1976	Geauga Lake	Funtime, Inc.	Gaspar Lococo, Earl Gascoigne, Dale Van Voorhis, & Milford Jacobson	SeaWorld Ohio	Harcourt Brace Jovanovich, Inc.	Milton C. Shedd, Ken Norris, David Dement, and George Millay
	Combined amusement and water park					
1983	Geauga Lake	Funtime, Inc.	Gaspar Lococo, Earl Gascoigne, Dale Van Voorhis, & Milford Jacobson	SeaWorld Ohio	Anheuser-Busch	Daniel Trausch
Fall 1989	Geauga Lake	Funtime, Inc.	Gaspar Lococo, Earl Gascoigne, Dale Van Voorhis, & Milford Jacobson	SeaWorld Ohio	Anheuser-Busch	Daniel Trausch
1996	Geauga Lake	Premier Parks	Gaspar Lococo	SeaWorld Ohio	Anheuser-Busch	Daniel Trausch
1998	Geauga Lake	Six Flags	Gaspar Lococo	SeaWorld Ohio	Anheuser-Busch	Daniel Trausch
1999	Geauga Lake	Six Flags	Gaspar Lococo	SeaWorld Cleveland	Anheuser-Busch	Daniel Trausch
2000	Six Flags Ohio	Six Flags	Jack Bateman, Daniel Trausch, Joe Costa	SeaWorld Cleveland	Anheuser-Busch	Daniel Trausch
	Combined amusement, water, and marine park					
	Name		Owner		Manager	
2001-2003	Six Flags Worlds Of Adventure		Six Flags		Rick McCurly	
	Combined amusement and water park					
	Name		Owner		Manager	
2004	Geauga Lake		Cedar Fair		Bill Spehn	
2005–2007	Geauga Lake & Wildwater Kingdom		Cedar Fair		Bill Spehn	

== See also ==
- Incidents at Geauga Lake
