= Thunderhawk (Michigan's Adventure) =

Roller coaster at Michigan's Adventure

- Previously known as Serial Thriller at Geauga Lake/Six Flags Ohio/Six Flags Worlds of Adventure (1998–2003); Thunderhawk at Geauga Lake (2004–2007)
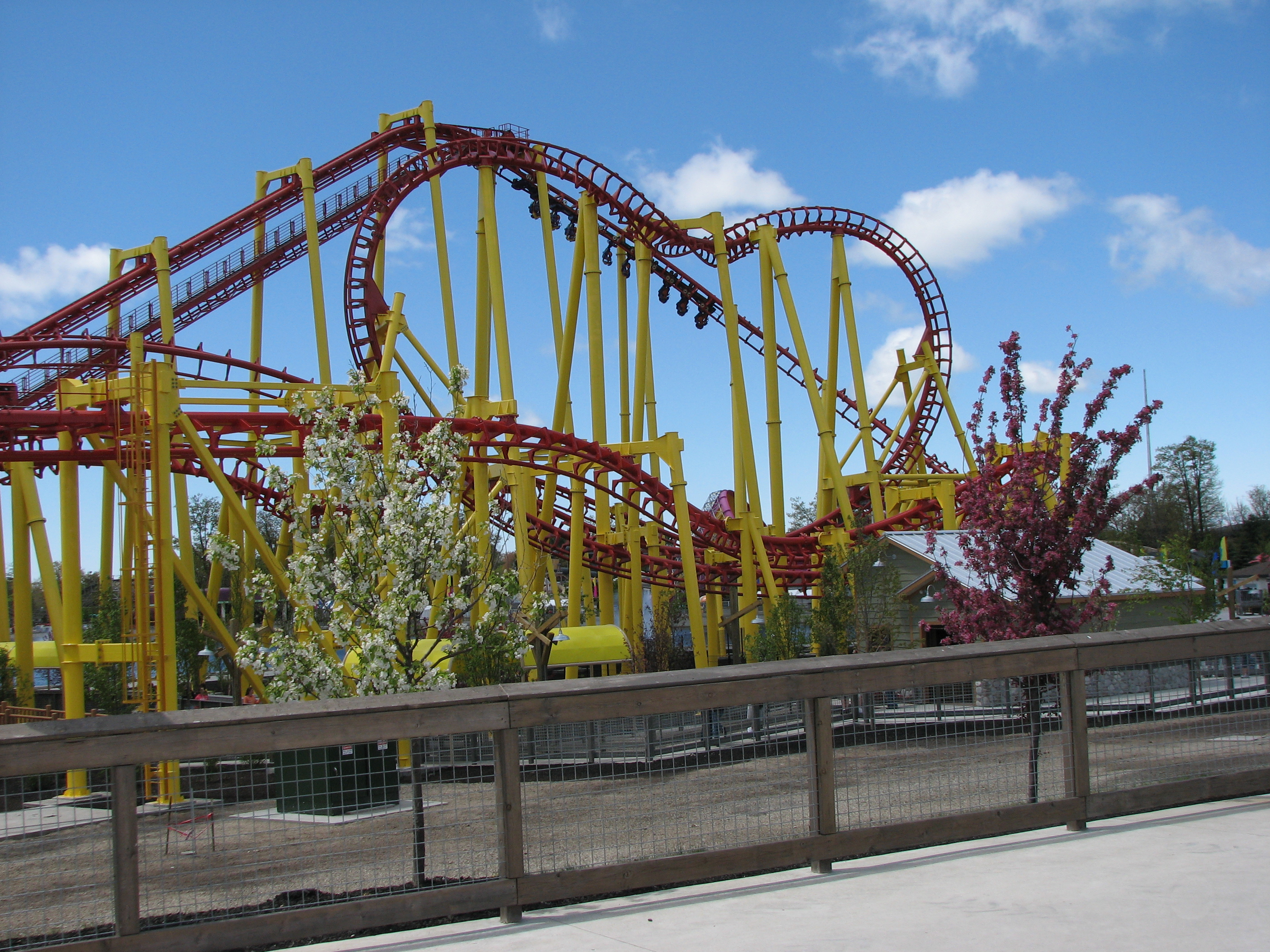
- The ride a day after it opened in 2008

Michigan's Adventure
- Park section: Timbertown
- Coordinates: 43.345208°N 86.37°W
- Status: Operating
- Opening date: May 17, 2008
- Cost: $10 million

Geauga Lake
- Coordinates: 41.35°N 86.276975°W
- Status: Removed
- Opening date: May 9, 1998
- Closing date: September 16, 2007

General statistics
- Type: Steel – Inverted
- Manufacturer: Vekoma
- Designer: Peter Clerx
- Model: Suspended Looping Coaster (689m Standard)
- Lift/launch system: Chain lift hill
- Height: 109.3 ft (33.3 m)
- Length: 2,260.5 ft (689.0 m)
- Speed: 49.7 mph (80.0 km/h)
- Inversions: 5
- Duration: 1:36
- Capacity: 1,040 riders per hour
- Height restriction: 52–78 in (132–198 cm)
- Trains: 2 trains with 10 cars; riders arranged 2 across in a single row for a total of 20 riders per train
- Fast Lane available
- Thunderhawk at RCDB

Video

Thunderhawk is an inverted roller coaster located at Michigan's Adventure amusement park in Muskegon, Michigan. Designed and built by Vekoma, the roller coaster originally debuted in 1998 as Serial Thriller at Geauga Lake in Aurora, Ohio. It was renamed Thunderhawk in 2004 following Cedar Fair's acquisition of the park. After Geauga Lake's permanent closure in 2007, Thunderhawk was dismantled and moved to Michigan's Adventure, where it reopened in 2008.

== History ==
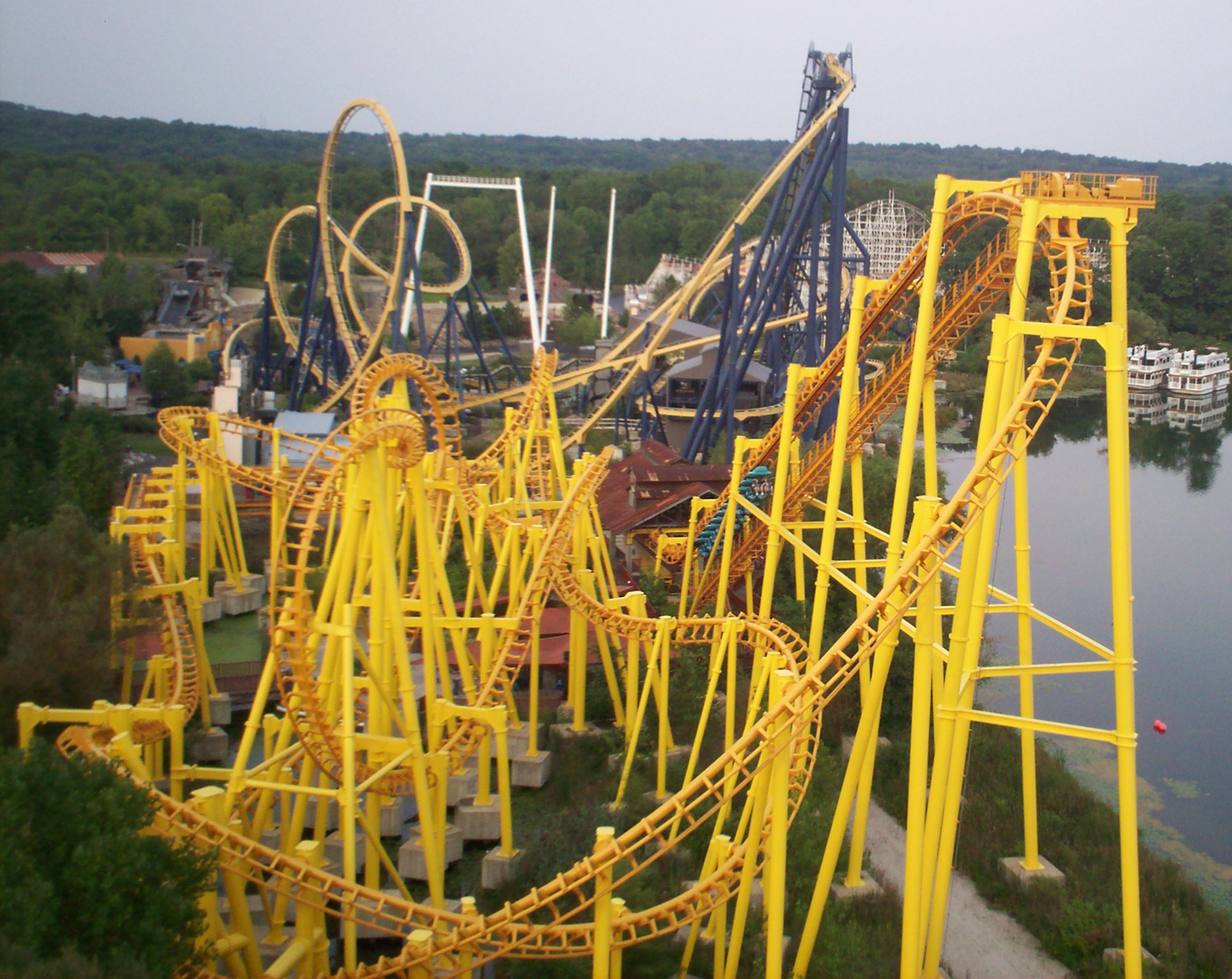
Thunderhawk in 2006 at Geauga Lake in Ohio

The ride originally opened at Geauga Lake as Serial Thriller on May 9, 1998. It was constructed over what was previously marshland along the shores of Geauga Lake. A small, man-made island was constructed, and to keep it dry, a pump was installed near the ride's entrance.

Serial Thriller was kept in operation following the park's ownership changes over the years involving Six Flags and Cedar Fair. After Cedar Fair purchased the park in 2004, the ride's name was changed to Thunderhawk. The following year, the track was repainted orange while the supports were repainted yellow.

On September 21, 2007, Cedar Fair announced that the amusement park side of Geauga Lake would close, leaving only the water park, Wildwater Kingdom, in operation. On October 2, 2007, it was announced that Thunderhawk would be relocated to Michigan's Adventure under the same name.

The ride's structure began to be reconstructed in January 2008. During construction of Thunderhawk, the roller coaster was repainted with red track and the supports remained yellow. Its padding and restraints on the trains were replaced as well in accordance with the new color scheme, as well as to improve the ride experience. Michigan's Adventure also made full-length ride DVDs available for purchase by riders. Thunderhawk opened at its current location on May 17, 2008.

== Ride experience ==
After riders board the train, they are pulled up the 109-foot (33 m) lift hill. After cresting its highest point, it turns right and drops 85 feet (26 m), reaching speeds of up to 50 mph (80 km/h). The train then ascends into a roll over, in which the train goes through an Immelmann immediately followed by a dive loop. This element inverts riders twice and is shaped like a heart. Next, the train travels through a banked hill and into a sidewinder, followed by a 270 degree downward helix into a double inline twist that features multiple footchopper effects. The train curves again, dips, and rises up into the final brake run. As the train returns to the station, it curves to the right passing by its maintenance track.

== Incident ==
On May 29, 2017, passengers were trapped on Thunderhawk for 90 minutes after a lift motor malfunction. One train was in the station while the other was on the lift hill. The ride was closed for the remainder of the day.
