= Firefall (ride) =

Amusement ride

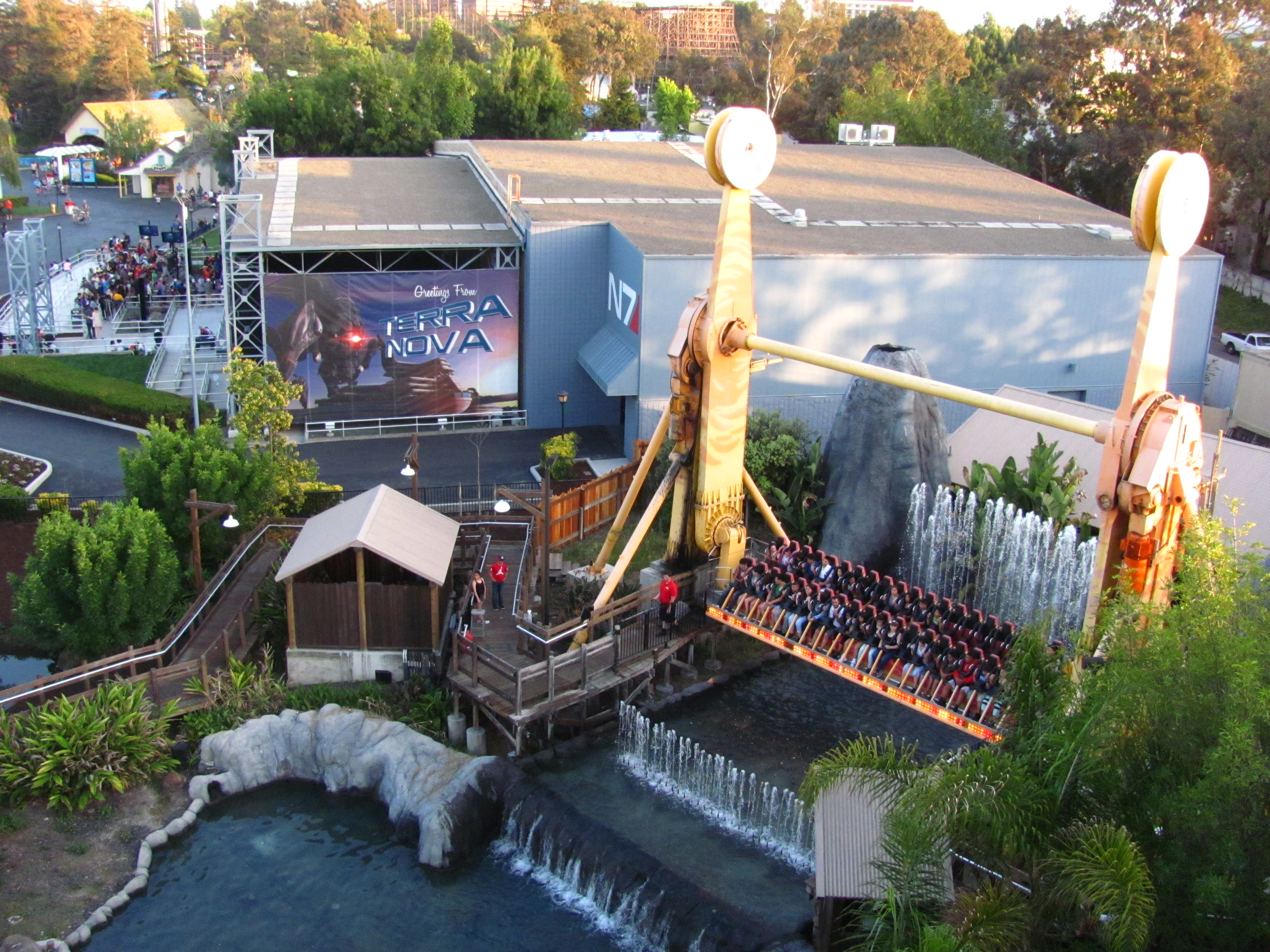

California's Great America
- Area: All American Corners
- Coordinates: 37°23′48.5″N 121°58′21.7″W
- Status: Removed
- Cost: US$2,000,000
- Opening date: May 17, 2008
- Closing date: October 30, 2016
- Replaced by: Liberty Twirler

Geauga Lake
- Status: Relocated
- Opening date: 1993
- Closing date: September 16, 2007

Ride statistics
- Attraction type: Top Spin
- Manufacturer: HUSS Park Attractions
- Model: Top Spin 1
- Height: 60 ft (18 m)
- Drop: 60 ft (18 m)
- Duration: 1:36
- Height restriction: 55–77 in (140–196 cm)
- Previous names: Texas Twister at Geauga Lake
- Fast Lane was available

Firefall was a Top Spin located at California's Great America. Manufactured by HUSS Park Attractions, the ride was originally located at Geauga Lake under the name Texas Twister. It was the first of its kind in North America. Upon the park's closing in 2007, the ride was relocated to its sister park, California's Great America, where it reopened in 2008. When it was moved, its original ride program was slightly modified. The ride operated at California's Great America until 2016, when it was closed, and later replaced by Liberty Twirler.

The ride featured a wall of water fountains which rose in front of the vehicle as it swung, giving the illusion that riders may get wet. Its finale sequence featured the bubbling water via pneumatic devices before catching on fire through the use of methane gas. The ride was set to the same soundtrack composed for the defunct ride The Crypt at Kings Dominion.
