= Roller Coaster (Papéa Parc) =

Steel roller coaster

- Previously known as Road Runner Express at Six Flags Ohio/Six Flags Worlds of Adventure (2000-2003); Beaver Land Mine Train at Geauga Lake (2004-2007)
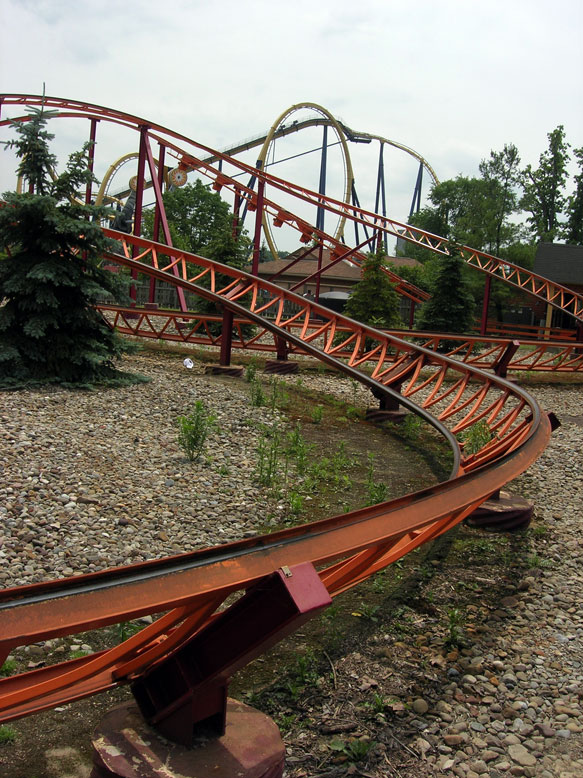

Papéa Parc
- Coordinates: 48.004032°N 0.258167°E
- Status: Operating
- Opening date: 2009

Geauga Lake
- Name: Beaver Land Mine Ride
- Coordinates: 41.353494°N 81.375550°W
- Status: Removed
- Opening date: 5 May 2000
- Closing date: 16 September 2007

General statistics
- Manufacturer: Zierer
- Designer: Werner Stengel
- Model: Large tivoli
- Track layout: Double figure eight
- Height: 8.0 m (26.2 ft)
- Drop: 7.6 m (25 ft)
- Length: 360.0 m (1,181.1 ft)
- Speed: 36.0 km/h (22.4 mph)
- Inversions: 0
- Capacity: 1,250 riders per hour
- Trains: Single train with 20 cars; riders arranged 2 across in a single row for a total of 40 riders per train
- Roller Coaster at RCDB

Roller Coaster is a steel roller coaster located at Papéa Parc in Yvré-l'Évêque, France. It was formerly known as Beaver Land Mine Ride and Road Runner Express at Geauga Lake in Aurora, Ohio. It was a standard production model junior coaster from Zierer. It is known for having the longest train of any coaster (with 20 two-seat cars) at Papea Parc, and it is also the only coaster in the park to complete a full circuit twice while in operation.

This ride was installed as Roadrunner Express at Geauga Lake when it was known as Six Flags Ohio in 2000 and was one of three identical coasters installed in Six Flags parks that year. It was named after the Looney Tunes character Road Runner.

In March 2004, Six Flags sold its Ohio park (renamed to Six Flags Worlds of Adventure in 2001 after purchasing the neighboring SeaWorld Ohio park and merged both parks together) to Cedar Fair, with the park being renamed back to Geauga Lake. Any references to Looney Tunes characters had to be removed from the park before opening day, since Cedar Fair did not own the licensing rights to it. This change affected several rides and attractions, including Roadrunner Express. Cedar Fair renamed the coaster Beaver Land Mine Ride.

On 16 September 2007, Geauga Lake closed down after the end of its 2007 operating season. Five days later, Cedar Fair announced that the park would close down permanently. Several of the rides began to be relocated to other amusement parks. Beaver Land Mine Ride was sold to Papéa Parc, where it reopened in 2009 as Roller Coaster and has operated even since.
