= Double Loop (Geauga Lake) =

Defunct steel roller coaster

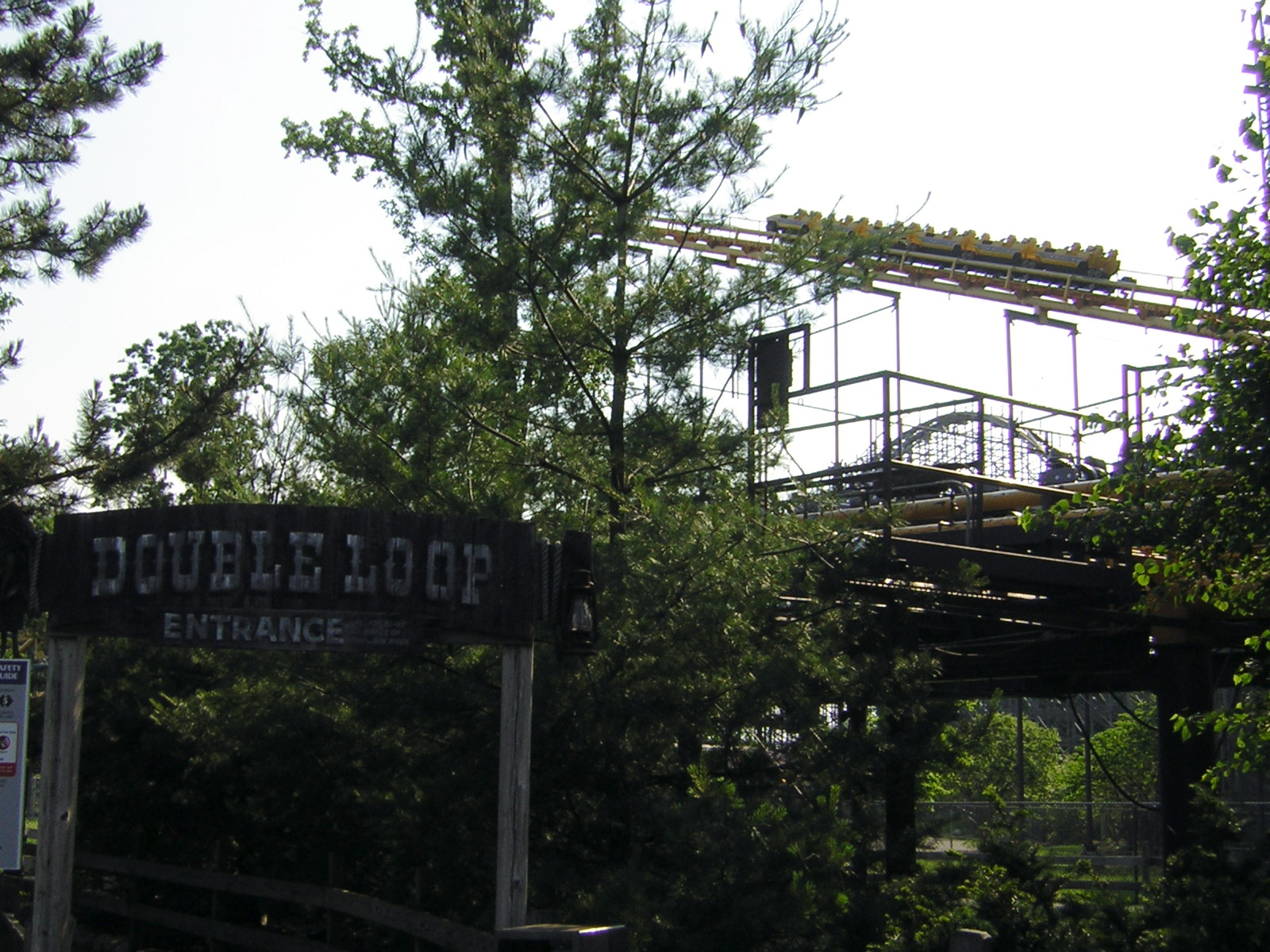

Geauga Lake
- Location: Geauga Lake
- Coordinates: 41.352837°N 81.377449°W
- Status: Removed
- Opening date: 1977
- Closing date: September 16, 2007
- Cost: $1.35 million

General statistics
- Type: Steel
- Manufacturer: Arrow Development
- Lift/launch system: Chain
- Height: 95 ft (29 m)
- Drop: 90 ft (27 m)
- Length: 1,800 ft (550 m)
- Speed: 36 mph (58 km/h)
- Inversions: 2
- Duration: 1:30
- Max vertical angle: 45°
- Capacity: 525 riders per hour
- Height restriction: 48 in (122 cm)
- Trains: 2 trains with 6 cars. Riders are arranged 2 across in 2 rows for a total of 24 riders per train.
- Double Loop at RCDB

Double Loop was a steel roller coaster located at Geauga Lake amusement park in Aurora, Ohio, United States. Built by Arrow Development, it opened in 1977 as the first roller coaster in the world to feature two consecutive vertical loops. The roller coaster operated until the park closed permanently in 2007, and it was later sold for scrap at an auction a year later.

== History ==
Riding on the heels of successful innovations like Corkscrew at Knott's Berry Farm, which in 1975 was the first modern looping roller coaster in the world, Utah-based Arrow Development was hired by Geauga Lake amusement park to design and build another industry first. Simply entitled Double Loop, the new design would become the first roller coaster in the world to feature back-to-back vertical loops. It was introduced at the park in 1977 at a total cost of $1.35 million.

The ride featured a 90-foot-drop (27 m), a helix, 1,800 feet (550 m) of track, and two vertical loops with one measuring 55 feet (17 m) in height and the other measuring 50 feet (15 m). Double Loop would be followed by the park's very own Corkscrew roller coaster – one of fourteen identical installations eventually produced by Arrow – which opened the following year in 1978. Both gave Geauga Lake the title of becoming the first amusement park to feature multiple looping roller coasters.

Double Loop's support structure was originally painted white, but would later be painted dark to match the track. The attraction debuted with two trains, one red and the other yellow. In 1993, the coaster underwent refurbishment adding some modernization to the control system. The outdated relay and photo eye controls were replaced with newer proximity switches to help improve reliability and to reduce downtime. Following Geauga Lake's acquisition by Six Flags, Double Loop was given a makeover in 2000, with a new paint scheme featuring a yellow track and purple supports. The yellow train was repainted a darker shade of yellow, while the red train was converted to purple.

== Track layout ==
After exiting the station, the train made a 180-degree left-hand turn inside a tunnel and into the lift hill element. The train then descended at a 45-degree angle 90 feet (27 m), followed by an incline and another 180-degree turn to the left. It would then drop into two consecutive vertical loops, followed by a slight ascent into a 360-degree downward helix before returning to the station.

== Auction ==
Following Geauga Lake's permanent closure in 2007, Double Loop was sold at auction – along with other former park rides – on June 17, 2008. A local scrap company purchased it for $23,000, and the coaster was later demolished.
