= Funtime, Inc. =

Defunct American amusement park company

Funtime, Inc
- Type: Public
- Industry: Amusement parks
- Founded: 1965
- Defunct: 1996
- Fate: Sold to Premier Parks
- Headquarters: Cleveland, Ohio
- Area served: United States

Funtime, Inc was an American amusement and entertainment company located in Cleveland, Ohio. The company was established in 1965. It owned several properties throughout its 31-year-long lifespan.

== History ==
Funtime Inc. was established in 1965 when four former Cedar Point employees, including Gasper Lococo (1928–2016), a former military sergeant from Huron, pooled their resources and purchased Geauga Lake in Ohio for $5 million. The park had previously been owned by members of the Kuhlman/Schryer family. In 1983, the company began managing Wyandot Lake in Columbus, Ohio. That same year FunTime acquired 50% controlling interest in Darien Lake. In 1995, Funtime entered into an agreement to manage Lake Compounce in Bristol, Connecticut.

=== Sale to Premier Parks ===
In August 1995 Funtime, Inc. was acquired by Premier Parks (later Six Flags) for $60 million. The deal to manage Lake Compounce was canceled and the Kennywood Entertainment Company was awarded the contract.

== Properties ==
Name	Location	Year opened	Year acquired	Fate
Geauga Lake	Aurora, Ohio	1887	1968	Sold to Six Flags in 1995 and later Cedar Fair in 2004. The Park permanently closed on September 16, 2007.
Darien Lake	Darien, New York	1954	1983	Sold to Six Flags in 1995. And later PARC Management, Herschend Family Entertainment, Premier Parks, LLC and currently EPR Properties with operations taken over by Six Flags.
Wyandot Lake	Columbus, Ohio	1977	1983	Sold to Six Flags in 1995, then to Columbus Zoo and Aquarium in 2006.

== Sources ==
- "Funtime Inc. co-founder Gasper Lococo has died « Amusement Today". amusementtoday.com. 7 October 2015.
- "Geauga Lake Today & Forever". geaugalaketoday.com.
- "Wild World In Maryland | * Adventure World, formerly Wild World, located in Largo... - tribunedigital-baltimoresun". The Baltimore Sun. Archived from the original on June 7, 2015.
