= Johnny Joo =

American photographer

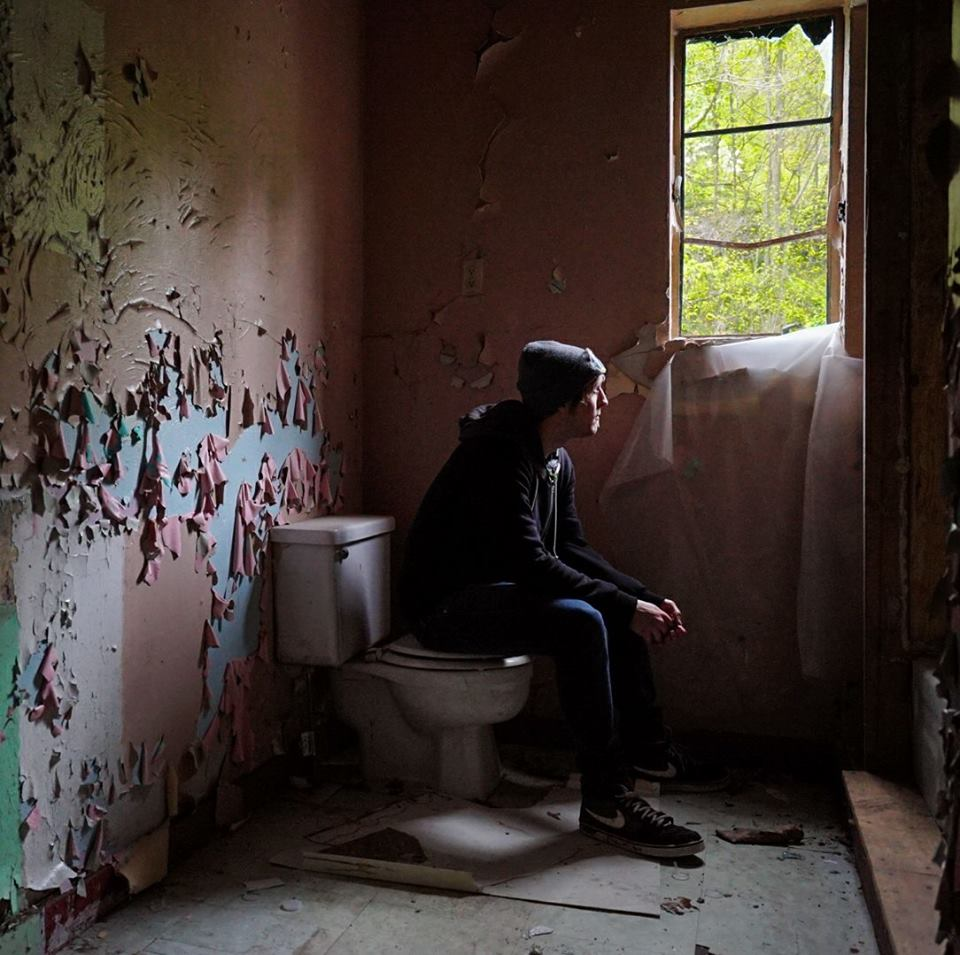
- American photographer Johnny Joo in the village of Yellow Dog, PA May 2017
- Occupation: Photographer
- Years active: 2007-present
- Website: oddworldstudio.com

Johnny Joo is an American photographer. He photographs urban decay in abandoned and historic structures.

== Work ==
Joo photographs abandoned and derelict buildings. He has taken photographs of the abandoned Land of Oz theme park on Beech Mountain, North Carolina, Mike Tyson's former mansion in Ohio, and the Steele Mansion of Painesville, Ohio. He self-publishes books of his photography, including Empty Spaces: Photojournalism Through the Rust Belt in 2014 and Americana Forgotten in 2016.

== Bibliography ==
- Empty Spaces: Photojournalism Through the Rust Belt. Self-published (May 2014)
- Americana Forgotten (soft cover first edition). Self-published (May 2016)
- Americana Forgotten (hard cover edition). Self-published (November 15, 2016) ISBN 0998101613
- Unbuilt by Time: The World We Once Knew. Self-published (2017) ISBN 978-0-9981016-2-0

== Exhibition ==
- Unveiled – Solo show – Mentor City Hall, Mentor, Ohio, 2017

== See also ==
- Dead mall
- Ruins photography
- Urban exploration
