= Wildwater Kingdom (Ohio) =

Water park in Ohio

- Interactive map of Wildwater Kingdom
- Slogan: "Let the good times flow"
- Location: Aurora and Bainbridge Township, Ohio, United States
- Coordinates: 41.34839°N 81.36919°W
- Owner: Cedar Fair
- General manager: Bill Spehn
- Opened: June 17, 2005; 21 years ago
- Closed: September 5, 2016; 10 years ago
- Previous names: Geauga Lake's Wildwater Kingdom (2008–2011)
- Operating season: May–September
- Status: Defunct[[]]
- Pools: 3 pools
- Water slides: 15 water slides
- Children's areas: 2 children's areas
- Website: https://www.wildwaterfun.com/ (archived)

Wildwater Kingdom was a water park located in Aurora and Bainbridge Township, Ohio, United States. Owned by Cedar Fair, the park opened in 2005 as part of the larger Geauga Lake and Wildwater Kingdom resort. The site was previously the location of SeaWorld Ohio (1970–2000) and later served as the marine life section of the larger Six Flags Worlds of Adventure (2001–2003). Worlds of Adventure was purchased by Cedar Fair in 2004 and the marine life area was converted into a water park for the 2005 season.

Cedar Fair closed the Geauga Lake amusement park following the 2007 season but kept the water park open. It was first known as Geauga Lake's Wildwater Kingdom, and the name was later shortened to Wildwater Kingdom. Its normal operating season extended from late May to Labor Day each year. The park featured 15 water slides including Thunder Falls, which opened as the tallest water slide complex in Ohio. On August 19, 2016, Cedar Fair released a statement announcing the permanent closure of Wildwater Kingdom. Its final day of operation was September 5, 2016.

== History ==
=== Background ===
Wildwater Kingdom was located on the former site of SeaWorld Ohio. In January 2001, SeaWorld Parks & Entertainment sold SeaWorld Ohio to Six Flags, who combined the site with Six Flags Ohio to form Six Flags Worlds of Adventure. Six Flags sold Worlds of Adventure to Cedar Fair in 2004, resulting in the removal of all Looney Tunes and DC Comics branding from the park and the Geauga Lake name being reinstituted.

=== Wildwater Kingdom ===
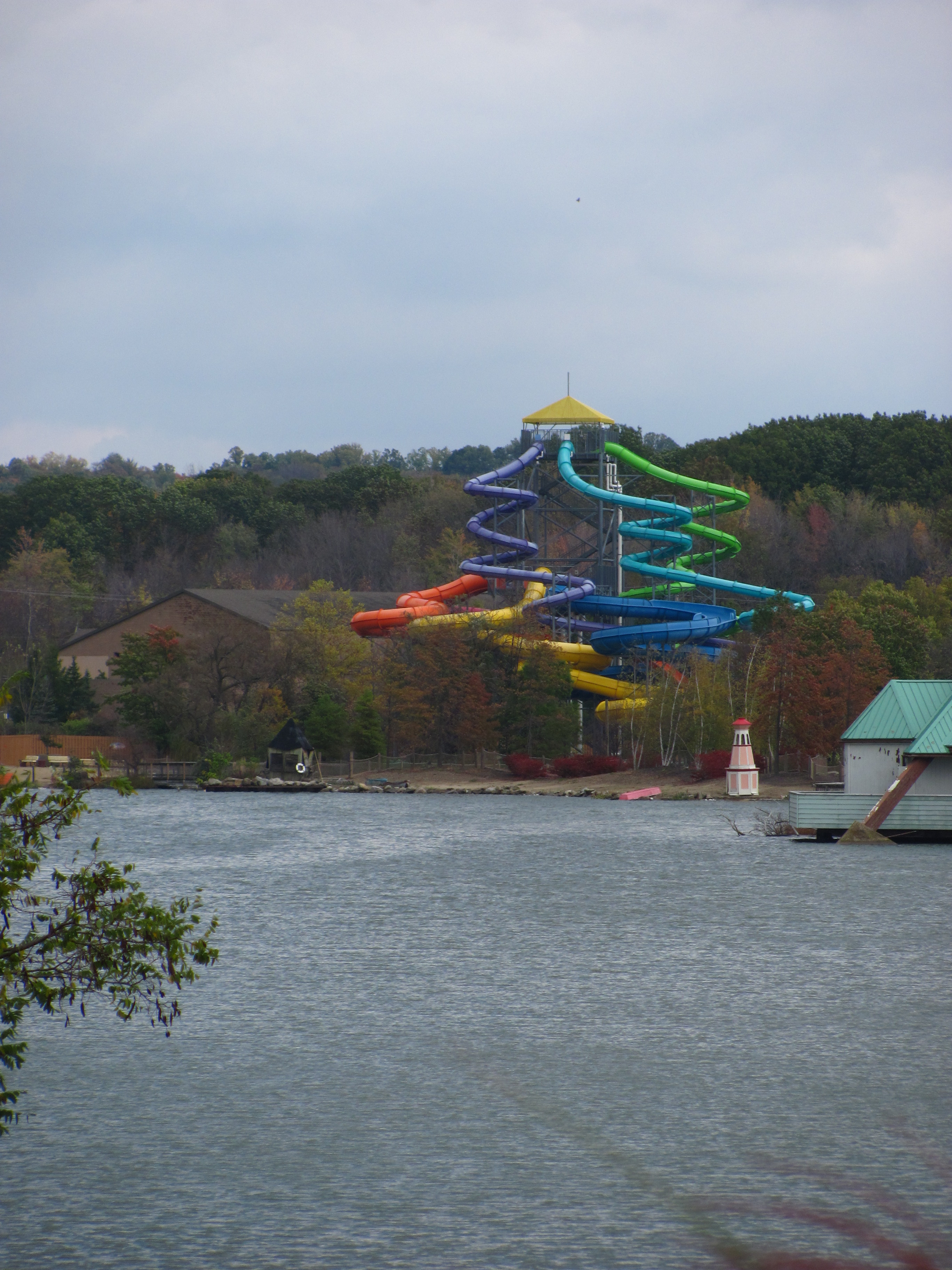
Thunder Falls, viewed from across the lake

Demolition of SeaWorld began in late 2004. Cedar Fair made plans to convert the site to a new water park. On November 11, 2004, Cedar Fair unveiled the new park as Wildwater Kingdom, announcing that it would open in 2005 upon the completion of the first phase of construction, which would include attractions such as ProSlide Tornado, an activity pool, an action river, and a new children's area with a multistory play structure. The Hurricane Mountain waterslide complex already at Six Flags Ohio was retained and renamed Thunder Falls. The amusement and water park complex would be rebranded as Geauga Lake & Wildwater Kingdom, connected by a floating bridge running through the middle of the lake. The construction project was conducted in two phases, with the first costing $16 million and the second costing $8 million.

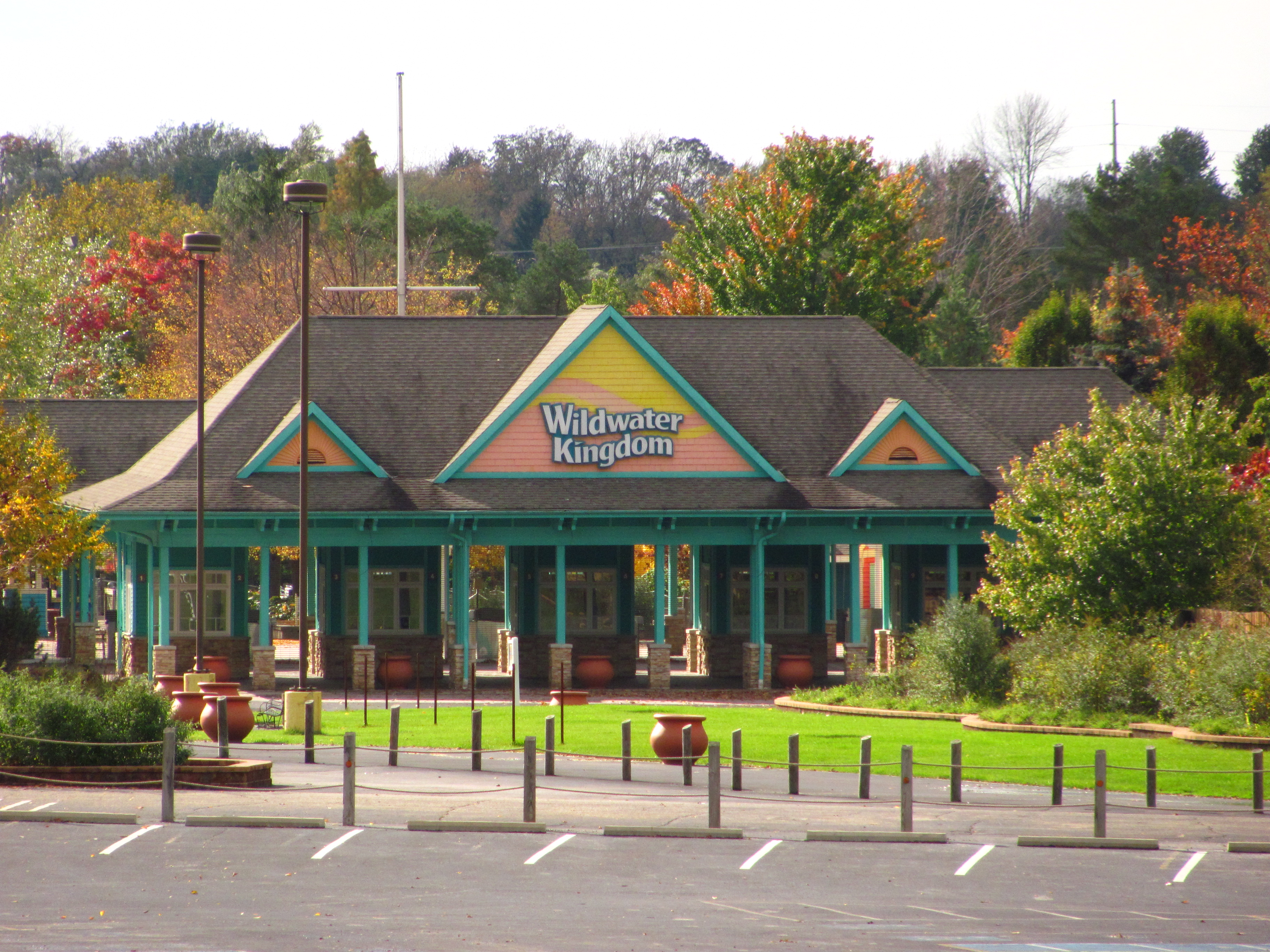
Entrance to Wildwater Kingdom

The second phase began the following offseason with plans to be completed in time for 2006, involving the addition of a 38,000-square-foot (3,500 m^{2}) wave pool, an adult pool with whirlpool spas, a swim-up bar, and two more water-slide towers. There were also plans to add an open-air auditorium and reopen a play area called Happy Harbor. However, only the wave pool was built. If the second phase had been completed, Wildwater Kingdom would have encompassed 20 acres (8.1 ha) to become one of the largest water parks in the United States. Instead, it was only expanded to 17 acres (6.9 ha).

Before Wildwater Kingdom, Geauga Lake had its own water park which operated for more than 20 years. During the Six Flags era, it was known as Hurricane Harbor. Cedar Fair renamed it Hurricane Hannah's following its acquisition of World of Adventures in 2004. Hurricane Hannah's was closed permanently after the 2005 season, and it sat vacant and fenced off during the 2006 and 2007 seasons.

On September 21, 2007, Cedar Fair announced that the amusement park portion of Geauga Lake & Wildwater Kingdom would not reopen in 2008. Geauga Lake was dropped from the waterpark's title in 2011, and it was marketed as simply Wildwater Kingdom. The original amusement park's property was put up for sale in 2013.

Several years later, Wildwater Kingdom would close permanently as well. Cedar Fair made the announcement on August 19, 2016. In their press release they stated, "Cedar Fair has been working cooperatively with both Bainbridge Township and the City of Aurora to redevelop the entire property into what will best benefit the surrounding communities. After examining its long-range plans, Cedar Fair has determined that the time is right to begin this transition and will continue to work together with community leadership in the positive future development of the property." The water park's final day of operation was September 5, 2016. The last remaining attractions were demolished in November 2017. In August 2020, ground was broken for a mixed-use development, featuring 308 residential units, 20 acres of commercial space and 98 acres of park land to replace the former Wildwater Kingdom property.

== Slides and pools ==
Area	Year opened	Manufacturer	Description	Thrill Rating
Coral Cove	2005	Aquatic Development Group, Inc.	Activity pool with basketball hoops, interactive water sprays and climbable floatables.	Mild
Liquid Lightning	2005	ProSlide Technology	Tornado slide which dropped 60 feet (18 m).	Max
Riptide Run	2005	Aquatic Development Group, Inc.	1,100-foot (340 m) long lazy river.	Mild
Splash Landing	2005	WhiteWater West	Four-story children's play area that had 7 waterslides, soaking gadgets, geysers, water cannons and a giant bucket that dropped 1,000 gallons of water at several-minute intervals.	Mild
Thunder Falls	2005	WhiteWater West	100-foot (30 m) high tower that featured 4 inner tube slides and 3 body slides. It was once the tallest water-slide complex in Ohio. It originally opened in 2003 at Hurricane Hannah's (the water park which was part of Geauga Lake before it merged with SeaWorld Ohio), and was moved to Wildwater Kingdom when the latter opened.	Moderate
Tidal Wave Bay	2006	Neuman Group	38,000-square-foot (3,500 m^{2}), 390,000-gallon wave pool. Was once one of the largest outdoor wave pools in Ohio.	Mild

=== Other attractions ===
In addition to slides and pools, the park featured several other family attractions. In 2010 it added a beach family-fun area, a children's attraction featuring a giant chessboard with movable playing pieces. There was also a beach area overlooking Geauga Lake. Little Tikes Town, a children's area with playhouses and toys, was located behind Thunder Falls.

== Reception ==
Wildwater Kingdom was regarded as Northeast Ohio's best water park. When the park operated as Geauga Lake & Wildwater Kingdom, the water park was the park's "highest rated attribute".

== In popular culture ==
A scene between Kevin Costner and Frank Langella in the 2014 film Draft Day, was filmed at Wildwater Kingdom.

== See also ==
- Wildwater Kingdom in Allentown, Pennsylvania (another Cedar Fair property)
- List of water parks
