= Fascination (redemption game) =

American amusement park game

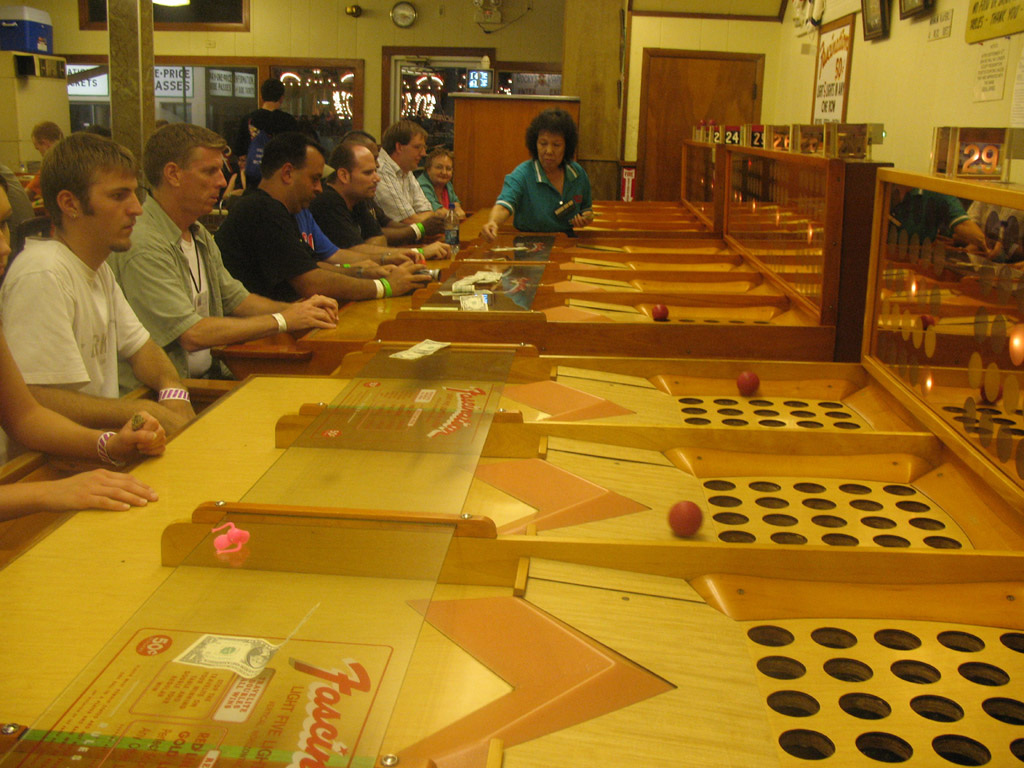
A Fascination parlor still in operation at Indiana Beach

Fascination is a game commonly found in North American amusement parks, boardwalks and arcades. The game is a redemption game, in that prizes are often won for playing the game. The game dates to 1918, with the first location opening at Coney Island, NY. It became popular during the 1920s and spread quickly from coast to coast, as evidenced in pictures of Chutes at the Beach in San Francisco, a park that operated from 1903 - 1928 (when it became Playland at the Beach). Over a century later, there are still a handful of locations that are in operation, mostly in the Northeastern US.

== Game design and play ==
The game consists of a wooden table, roughly 1.3 metres (4 ft 3 in) long, 50 centimetres (20 in) wide and 1 metre (3 ft 3 in) high. The player sits at one narrow end of the table. At the other end of the table is a series of 25 holes, roughly 5 cm (2.0 in) in diameter, arranged in a five-by-five square matrix. The player rolls a rubber ball, similar to a racquetball or handball, toward the holes; the ball is only slightly smaller than the holes. As the ball falls through one of the holes, a light on a backboard behind the holes lights up, in a pattern corresponding to the hole the ball fell through. The ball then rolls back to the player on a slight incline slanted back from the holes. The process is repeated until a player lights five lights in a row, either across the matrix, in a vertical column, or on a diagonal, much like bingo—indeed, like bingo, the hole in the center of the matrix is a "free space." A glass plate over the front part of the table keeps players from reaching too far over the table to improve their aim.

Fascination tables are typically installed in groups from 20 to 50, but can be in as small as a system of two, up to any amount without limit, and are interlocked through an electromechanical, and/or electronic system. Players play against each other, with the first player to complete a row of five being the winner, with the interlocking system determining which was first and locking out all others. If two or more players tie, each is declared a winner. Games usually cost 10 to 50 cents each, normally placed on the glass plate where a game operator can collect it shortly after each game begins. Games usually last between 60 and 90 seconds, with a new game starting soon after the end of the previous one.

Winners receive a prize coupon or token, which can be redeemed for a small prize, or collected to redeem for bigger prizes later, or in some locations, coupons may be redeemed as cash to play more games. Bonus coupons or tokens can be won by winning with all spots lighted on a certain row marked by colored lights; usually, the top row on the board (the back row of holes) is red and wins three to five times the normal rate, and the fourth row from the top (the second row of holes from the front) is gold and wins double the normal rate. Some operators have additional bonuses for certain lines.

An announcer, sitting on an elevated platform, presides over the activities. The announcer starts each game by pressing a button which rings a bell and activates all machines. The winner is also announced when the bell rings again, which the machine does automatically when a win is detected. One or more assistants collect the fees and pay winners. Other employees run a prize booth, where winners redeem their coupons or tokens. The prizes range from cheap trinkets for one or two wins to appliances, radios, televisions, toys and more expensive items for large numbers of coupons or tokens, often numbering into the thousands for the best prizes.

== History ==
Fascination was invented in Salt Lake City, Utah by John Taylor Gibbs who moved to Beverly Hills, California, where he formed the business Taylor Engineering Corp.

The game was a popular attraction at amusement parks before the modern theme park drained visitors away to the newer, more modern facilities. When the old-line amusement parks died off, the Fascination parlors went with them. The game was also popular in oceanside resort towns, particularly those with boardwalks and especially on the Northeast and Mid-Atlantic shorelines of the Atlantic Ocean. Coney Island, Atlantic City and Wildwood, New Jersey were popular places with multiple Fascination parlors; Wildwood is home to the last remaining parlors in New Jersey. On the west coast there is a Fascination parlor in Seaside, Oregon. Through 2019, the oldest remaining Fascination game had been in Nantasket Beach, Massachusetts, which was the original 1918 game from Coney Island, although it was closed late that year following storm damage.

The game has declined not only because of the demise of old-style amusement parks, but also the age of the machines themselves. The heart of the system relied on relays used in telephone system, which have long been obsolete; moreover, manufacturers of the tables have long ago shut down, so spare parts have to be salvaged from old tables. Operation is also labor-intensive, with at least three employees (often more) at a time required to run a game. The game could easily be made more reliable and less labor-intensive with updated computer-based technology (as was done in the mid-1990s at the Indiana Beach parlor and at the Tributes and Traditions Retro Arcade & Fascination in Wildwood, NJ, during 2019-2020) and automatic coin collection and coupon dispensing equipment such as that on a skee ball game, but the closure of many Fascination parlors has made such an effort unlikely.

A modern arcade game called "Lite-a-Line" can be found today, with roots in Fascination in that it features the same basic game play and pays off in redemption tickets. However, Lite-a-Line is a stand-alone game, played against "the house" as with skee ball and the like. It is commonly found in places such as Chuck E. Cheese. (It should not be confused with a 1930s pinball machine of the same name. Moreover, some Internet sites indicate that there may have been Fascination parlors that instead operated under the name "Lite-a-Line," but the evidence is inconclusive.)

"I-Got-It" is a variant of Fascination invented in 1961 in Western New York. Its mechanism is slightly different in that balls are tossed over an open pit instead of rolled, and the ball does not return to the player, staying in place throughout the game unless it is knocked out of place by another thrown ball. I-Got-It is seen most frequently in traveling carnivals.

== Locations ==
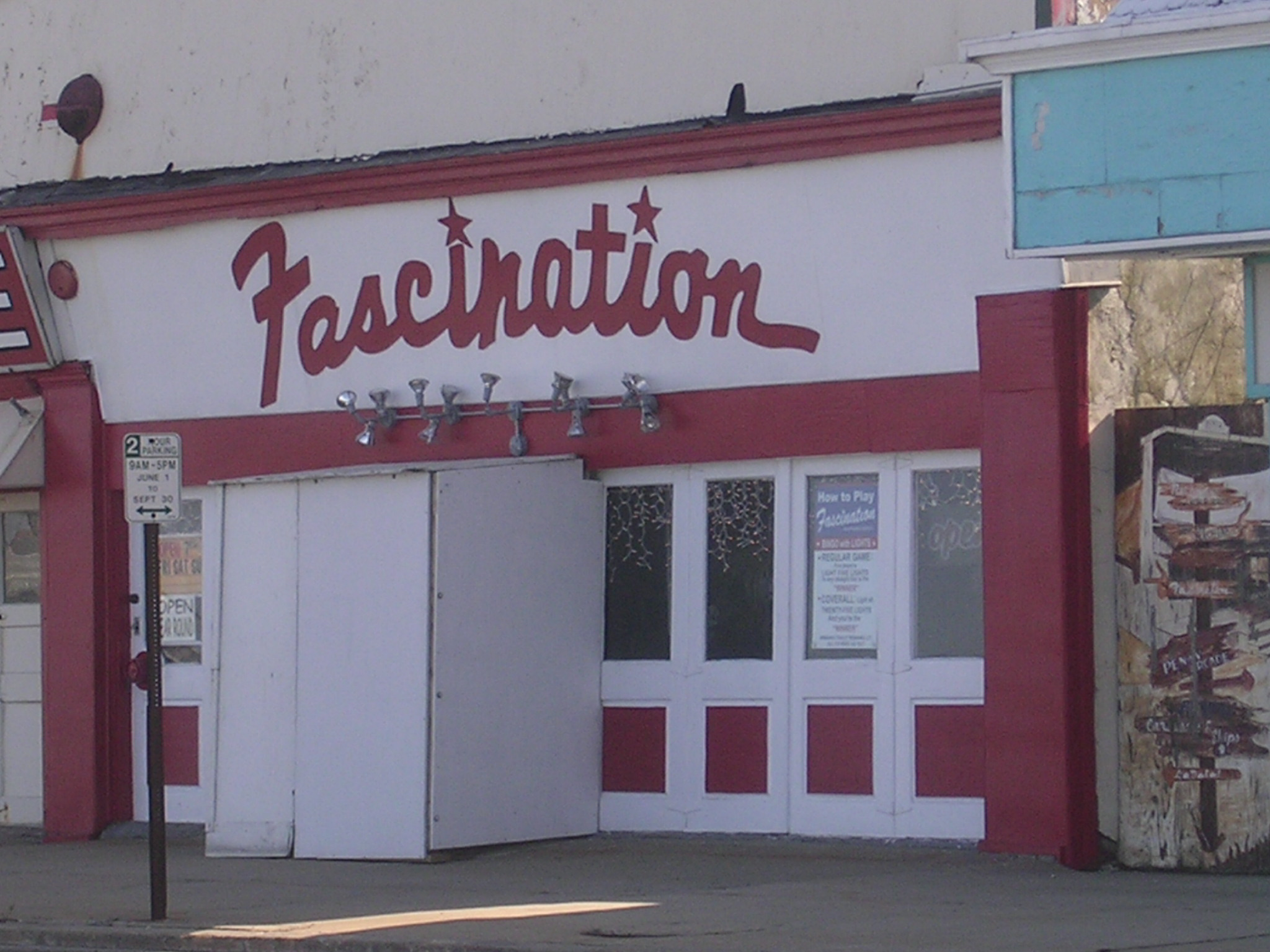
A Fascination parlor in operation at Nantasket Beach

=== Active locations ===
Seven known locations are open to the public as of June 2026.

==== Indiana ====
- Monticello, Indiana (Indiana Beach)
  - This location has been in operation since the 1930s.
  - The boards at this location offer the center "Free Space" but don't cover the actual hole, making for a slightly more challenging game.

==== New Jersey ====
- Wildwood, New Jersey (Tributes and Traditions - Retro Arcade & Fascination, relocated from the Boardwalk Mall in 2019)
  - The only Fascination game operating in the State of New Jersey. The machines used here are the ones formerly used at the ill-fated Olympic Fascination and Casino Arcade in North Wildwood.
  - The entire game system was refurbished and modernized for 2020 by the arcade's owner, Randy Senna.

==== New York ====
- Darien, New York (Six Flags Darien Lake)
- Sylvan Beach, New York (Sylvan Beach Amusement Park)
  - Sylvan Beach also has similar games based on blackjack and tic-tac-toe rules and scoring.

==== Ohio ====
- Geneva-on-the-Lake, Ohio (5472 Lake Rd E)
  - Opened in the 1940s, one of two known Fascination parlors that were operated in the town.

==== Oregon ====
- Seaside, Oregon (Funland Arcade)
  - Opened in 1950, this is the only remaining "traditional" Fascination game in operation west of the Mississippi River.

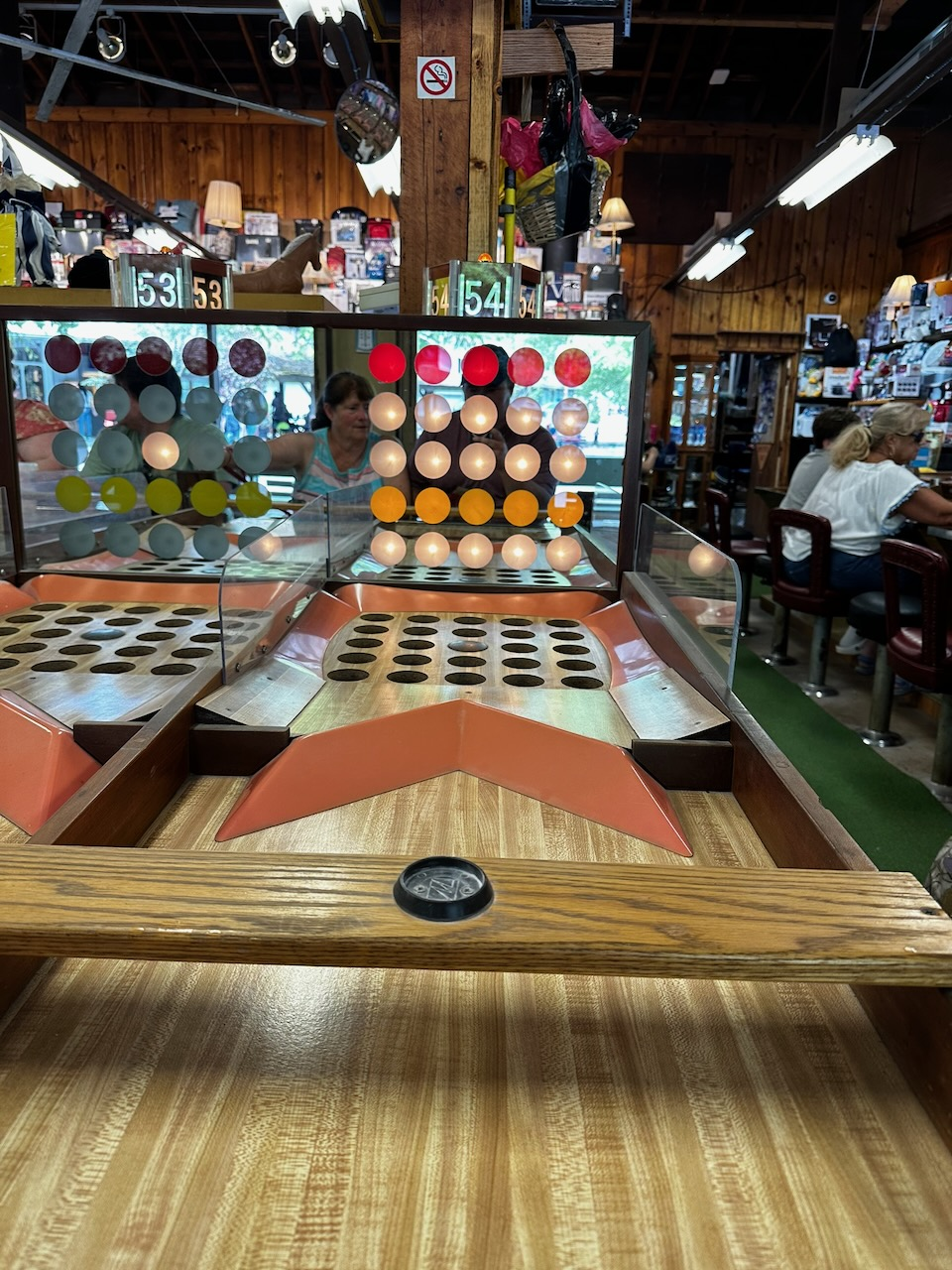
A Fascination machine at Knoebels Amusement Resort.

==== Pennsylvania ====
- Elysburg, Pennsylvania (Knoebels Amusement Resort)
  - Knoebels does not charge an admission fee or for parking.

=== Former locations ===
==== California ====
- El Cerrito, California (Playland-Not-At-The-Beach, Museum of Fun closed 2018)
- San Francisco, California (1027 Market Street)
  - This parlor was reported as "Closed for Remodeling" in 2005. It was the last known Fascination parlor not located in a park or resort area, and paid winners money instead of prize credits.
- Santa Cruz, California (Santa Cruz Beach Boardwalk, converted into restrooms in 2007)
- Long Beach, California (Looff's Lite-A-Line)
  - This location had the pinball-style version of the game and paid out money instead of coupons or prizes. Closed November 28, 2022.

==== Colorado ====
- Denver, Colorado (Elitch Gardens)

==== Illinois ====
- Chicago, Illinois (Riverview Park)

==== Indiana ====
- Santa Claus, Indiana (Holiday World)

==== Kansas ====
- Wichita, Kansas (Joyland Amusement Park, closed 2006)

==== Kentucky ====
- Bowling Green, Kentucky (Beech Bend Park)

==== Maryland ====
- Baltimore, Maryland (Gwynn Oak amusement park)

==== Massachusetts ====
- Agawam, Massachusetts (Riverside Park, now Six Flags New England)
- Dartmouth, Massachusetts (Lincoln Park, game building burned down)
- Lunenburg, Massachusetts (Whalom Park)
- Nantasket Beach, Hull, Massachusetts
  - Had been the last play-for-cash Fascination Parlor in existence, but was closed in 2019 due to storm damage. These machines originally opened in Coney Island in 1918 and were moved to Nantasket Beach in 1944. At the time of closure, they had been the oldest Fascination machines still in operation.
- Revere, Massachusetts (Revere Beach, closed in 1984, never recovered from "Blizzard of '78")

==== Minnesota ====
- Shakopee, Minnesota (Valleyfair amusement park)

==== Nevada ====
- Las Vegas, Nevada (Circus Circus)
- Reno, Nevada (Circus Circus)

==== New Hampshire ====
- Salem, New Hampshire (Canobie Lake Park, removed prior to the 2001 season, replaced with "Jackpot Casino")

==== New Jersey ====
- Asbury Park, New Jersey (714 Boardwalk, Casino Building, known as "Ruben's Fascination")
- Atlantic City, New Jersey (The Boardwalk)
- Fort Lee, New Jersey (Palisades Amusement Park)
- Keansburg, New Jersey (Keansburg Amusement Park)
- North Wildwood, New Jersey (Olympic Fascination and Casino Arcade)
- Palisades Park, New Jersey
- Seaside Heights, New Jersey (Seaside Heights Boardwalk, Lucky's Fascination)
- Wildwood, New Jersey (Flipper's Fascination)
- Wildwood, New Jersey (Retro Arcade at the Boardwalk Mall, 3800 Boardwalk)
  - The actual name is "Lucky's Fascination" and was a predecessor of Lucky's Fascination which operated in Seaside Heights from 1974 to 1995. Was relocated following turnover of mall ownership in 2018.

==== New York ====
- Brooklyn, New York (Coney Island, Faber's Fascination) closed 2021
- Brooklyn, New York (Luna Park, Coney Island)
- Canandaigua, New York (Roseland Park)
- Corfu, New York (Six Flags Darien Lake)
- Farmingdale, New York (Adventureland, removed c. 1994)
- Long Beach, Long Island, New York
- New York City (Times Square, closed 1981)
- Rochester, New York (Olympic Park)
- Rochester, New York (Seabreeze Amusement Park, formerly Dreamland Park)
- Rockaway (Edgemere), Queens, New York (Faber's Fascination)
- Rockaway (Edgemere), Queens, New York (Lenny's Fascination)
- Rockaway Beach, Queens, New York (Rockaways' Playland, Pinky's Fascination)
- Sylvan Beach, New York (Sylvan Beach Amusement Park)

==== Ohio ====
- Aurora, Ohio (Geauga Lake, rides and games closed 2007)
- Geneva-on-the-Lake, Ohio (Pera family “budget” version of the game, location burned down in 1979)
- Mason, Ohio (Kings Island)
- Monroe, Ohio (LeSourdsville Lake Amusement Park, closed 2002)
- Sandusky, Ohio (Cedar Point, removed 2001)
- Youngstown, Ohio (Idora Park, destroyed in 1984 fire)

==== Oregon ====
- Portland, Oregon (Jantzen Beach Amusement Park)
- Seaside, Oregon (Funland Arcade)

==== Pennsylvania ====
- Conneaut Lake, Pennsylvania (Conneaut Lake Park, tables burned in Beach Club fire 1 Aug 2013)
- Hershey, Pennsylvania (Hersheypark, removed 2014)
- South Whitehall Township, Pennsylvania (Dorney Park)
- West Mifflin, Pennsylvania (Kennywood, room closed following 1998 season)
- West View, Pennsylvania (West View Park)
- Willow Grove, Pennsylvania (Willow Grove Park)

==== Rhode Island ====
- Warwick, Rhode Island (Rocky Point Amusement Park)

==== Utah ====
- Farmington, Utah (Lagoon Amusement Park)

==== Virginia ====
- Salem, Virginia (Lakeside Amusement Park)

==== International ====
- Montreal, Quebec, Canada (Belmont Park, closed 1983)
- Surfers Paradise, Queensland, Australia (Grund's, Paradise Centre)
