= Vernon Keenan (coaster designer) =

American roller coaster designer

Vernon Keenan (1886–1964) was an American roller coaster designer best known for his involvement with the Cyclone at Coney Island.

== Biography ==
Vernon Keenan was born in Henry County, Kentucky, on August 8, 1886. His parents were Andrew J. Keenan and Anna Belle Grigsby, both born in Kentucky. Vernon was the oldest child in a family of seven children. In 1900 Andrew Keenan, Vernon's father, was listed as a lock keeper on the Kentucky River in Clover Bottom, Woodford County, Kentucky. Andrew Keenan worked at various locks along the river, including the ones in Jessamine County, Kentucky, and Henry County, Kentucky. When Vernon filled out his Military Registration Card in June 1917 for the World War I Draft he was living in Columbus, Ohio, with his wife Ula (born in West Virginia) and one child. "At that time he was employed as a Civil Engineer at the Ingersoll Construction Company in Cincinnati, Ohio. Vernon and Ula had four children, three daughters and one son, Vernon Keenan Jr. Vernon Keenan Sr. died in November 1964 and is buried in Oak Park Cemetery, New Castle, Lawrence County, Pennsylvania. Vernon's parents, Andrew and Anna Keenan, are buried in the Dutch Track Cemetery, North Pleasureville, Henry County, Kentucky.

=== Early life ===
The earliest coaster to be credited to Keenan is the 1918-built Giant Roller Coaster at Rexford Park. During this time he met Harry C. Baker who was the manager of the park. The two would go on to build the Coney Island Cyclone together.

=== Coney Island Cyclone ===
In 1927, Jack and Irving Rosenthal purchased land at the intersection of Surf Avenue and West 10th Street and, with a $100,000 investment, they hired Keenan to design a new coaster. Harry C. Baker supervised the construction, which was done by area companies including National Bridge Company (which supplied the steel) and Cross, Austin, & Ireland (which supplied the lumber). The Cyclone was built on the site of America's first roller coaster, known as Switchback Railway (which opened on January 16, 1884). Its final cost has been reported to be around $146,000 to $175,000. When it opened on June 26, 1927, a ride cost only twenty-five cents (equivalent to $5 in 2024, compared to the $10 fee to ride as of 2019).

After the success of this endeavour, Keenan and Baker once again teamed to build one of the most debated roller coasters of the 1920s, the Blue Streak at Woodcliffe Pleasure Park. Keenan went on to serve as the manager at Crystal Beach Park in 1929. According to a letter written in 1974 by Vernon Keenan II, the elder Keenan also designed coasters for Chicago World's Fair and the 1939 New York World's Fair.

=== National Amusement Devices ===
Keenan joined National Amusement Devices in the late 1930s and served as chief coaster engineer. During this period he designed, among others, the Atom Smasher at Rockaways' Playland, a coaster featured extensively in the 1952 movie This Is Cinerama. He also designed the Comet at Lincoln Park, which opened in 1946.

== Coasters ==
Coasters that have been attributed to Keenan include

Name	Park	Location	Operational
Giant Roller Coaster	Rexford Park	Schnectady, NY	1918 - 1925
Cyclone	Coney Island	Brooklyn, NY	1927
Blue Streak	Woodcliff Pleasure Park	Poughkeepsie, NY	1928 - 1941
Twister	Woodcliff Pleasure Park	Poughkeepsie, NY	1938 - 1941
Atom Smasher	Rockaways' Playland	Rockaway Beach, NY	1938 - 1985
Flyer Comet	Whalom Park	Lunenburg, MA	1940 - 2000 (Note: Torn down/Dismantled October 18, 2006)
Sterling's “Million Dollar” Roller Coaster	Rocky Glen Park	Moosic, PA	1946 - 1957
Sky Blazer	White City	West Haven, CT	1946 - 1967
Comet	Lincoln Park	North Dartmouth, MA	1946 - 1987 (Note: Torn down/Dismantled November 7, 2012)
