= Bob White (offensive lineman) =

American football player (born 1963)

No. 70, 65
- Positions: Center, guard

Personal information
- Born: April 9, 1963 (age 63); Lunenburg, Massachusetts, U.S.
- Listed height: 6 ft 5 in (1.96 m)
- Listed weight: 272 lb (123 kg)

Career information
- High school: Lunenburg
- College: Rhode Island
- NFL draft: 1986: 7th round, 189th overall pick

Career history
- New York Jets (1986)*; Dallas Cowboys (1987–1989); New England Patriots (1990)
- * Offseason or practice squad member only

Awards and highlights
- All-New England (1984, 1985); All-Yankee (1984, 1985); Second-team Division I-AA All-American (1985)

Career NFL statistics
- Games played: 24
- Games started: 10
- Stats at Pro Football Reference

Robert Arlen White (born April 9, 1963) is an American former professional football player who was a center in the National Football League (NFL) for the Dallas Cowboys and New England Patriots. He played college football for the Rhode Island Rams.

== Early life ==
White attended Lunenburg High School, where he was a Wachusett League All-star. He accepted a football scholarship from the University of Rhode Island. He started his first two seasons for the Rams at center. He started at left tackle as a junior.

As a senior, he started at right tackle in an offense that featured quarterback Tom Ehrhardt, who led the nation in total offense, passing an average of 50 times a game, while scoring a total of 42 touchdowns. He was named a team captain and was a part of two Yankee Conference titles in his last 2 years.

In 2011, he was inducted into the Rhode Island Athletics Hall of Fame.

== Professional career ==
=== New York Jets ===
White was selected by the New York Jets in the seventh round (189th overall) of the 1986 NFL draft. He was waived on August 25.

=== Dallas Cowboys ===
In 1987, he was signed as a free agent by the Dallas Cowboys. He began training camp playing at guard and was switched to center for the last 2 weeks. He was released before the start of the season on September 7. After the players went on a strike on the third week of the season, those games were canceled (reducing the 16-game season to 15) and the NFL decided that the games would be played with replacement players. In September, he was re-signed to be a part of the Cowboys replacement team, which was given the mock name "Rhinestone Cowboys" by the media. He ended up playing well in those 3 games as the starter at right guard, and was kept for the rest of the season playing mainly as a backup and on special teams.

In 1988, he suffered a thigh bruise in training camp that forced him to miss 4 regular-season contests. He appeared in 12 games with 3 starts in place of an injured Tom Rafferty. In 1989, he appeared in 8 games with 4 starts in place of an injured Rafferty.

=== New England Patriots ===
On March 23, 1990, he was signed in Plan B free agency by the New England Patriots. He was cut on September 3. He was re-signed on October 26 and released after 2 games on November 6. He was re-signed on November 8 and cut on after one game on November 12.

== Personal life ==
White worked as a sparring partner for local light and middle heavyweights during his first two years in college.
