= Lunenburg High School =

Lunenburg Middle High School
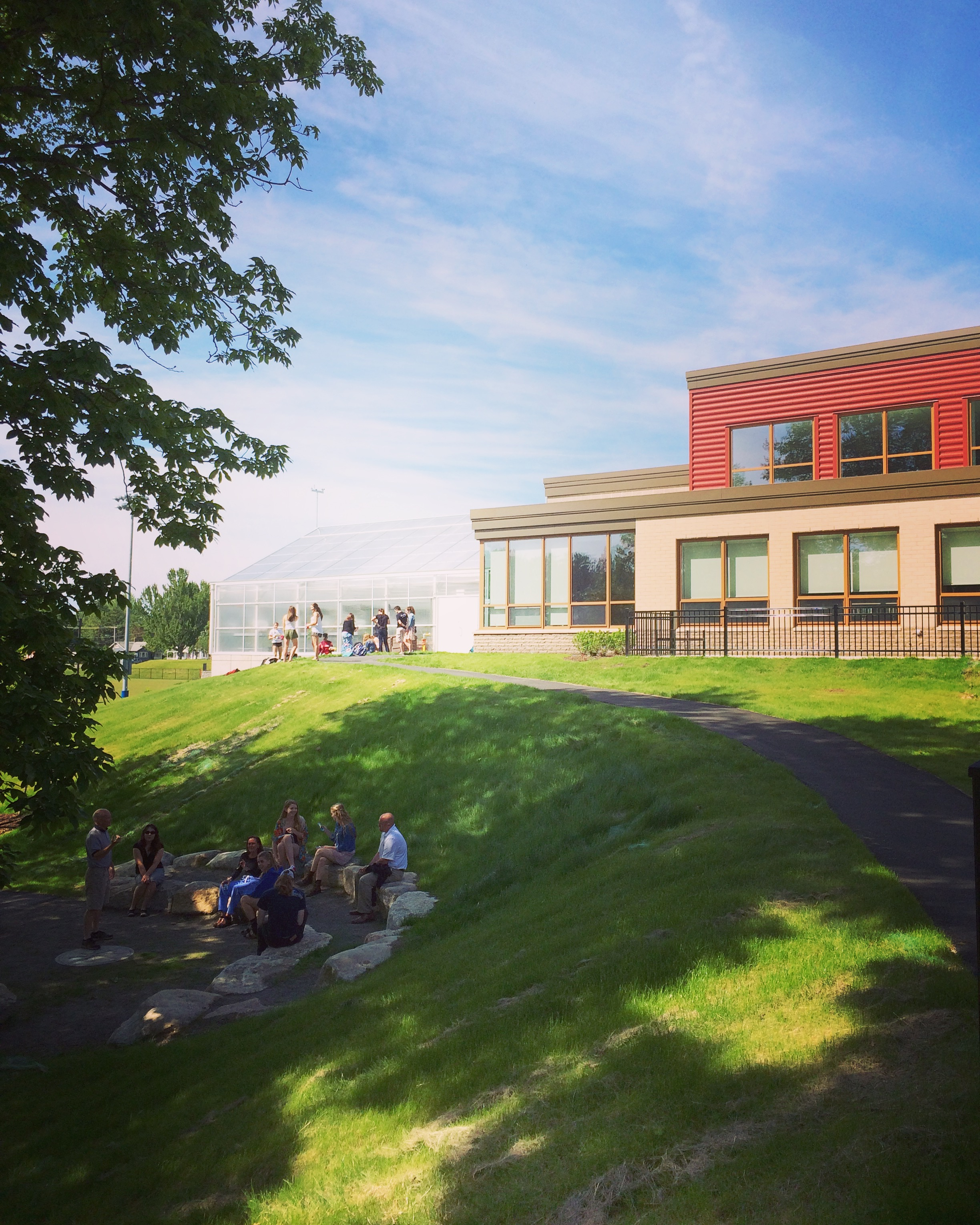
- Lunenburg High School

Location
- 1079 Massachusetts Ave; Lunenburg, Massachusetts; 01462; United States
- Coordinates: 42°35′51.4″N 71°43′11.0″W

Information
- Type: Public High School; Open enrollment
- Opened: August 2016
- School district: Lunenburg Public Schools
- Superintendent: Kate Burnham
- Principal: Timothy Santry
- Teaching staff: 36.96 (FTE)
- Grades: 9-12
- Enrollment: 449 (2023–2024)
- Student to teacher ratio: 12.15
- Campus size: 167,000 SQFT
- Campus type: High School
- Colors: Blue; White
- Athletics conference: Midland Wachusett League
- Mascot: Blue Knight
- Website: https://sites.google.com/a/lunenburgschools.net/lhs/

Lunenburg High School is the high school of the town of Lunenburg, Massachusetts, United States in north-eastern Worcester County. The school educates students from Lunenburg. In 2016, a new Middle/High School building was completed.

== Administration ==
- Timothy Santry - Principal (Acting)
- Robert McGrath - Assistant Principal
- Karma Tousignant - Assistant Principal
- Annica Scott - Dean of Students

== Notable alumni ==
- Gordon Edes - sportswriter for the Boston Globe
- Christopher Dijak - professional wrestler currently signed to WWE, competing under the ring name of Donovan Dijak
- Bob White - former NFL player

== Athletics ==
The school is a member of the Massachusetts Interscholastic Athletic Association. It is classified as District D and a part of the Midland Wachusett League. The school mascot is the Blue Knight.

After allegations of racism against its football program in 2013, the school cancelled the final game of the season. Teammates were initially suspected of spray painting racist slurs on a biracial player's house, but police and the FBI later investigated the player's mother, and the students were cleared of any wrongdoing. After an investigation, Worcester County District Attorney Joseph D. Early, Jr. stated that "evidence presented to us fails to demonstrate beyond a reasonable doubt that a crime has been committed," but that the case remains open.
