= Jonathan Bourne =

Jonathan Bourne may refer to:

- Jonathan Bourne Jr., United States Senator (1855–1940)
- Jonathan Bourne Jr. (merchant) (1811–1889)
