= Dorothea Leighton =

American social psychiatrist (1908–1989)

- Born: September 2, 1908; Lunenburg, Massachusetts, US
- Died: August 15, 1989 (aged 80)

Academic background
- Education: Bryn Mawr College; Johns Hopkins School of Medicine; Creighton University

Academic work
- Discipline: social psychiatry; medical anthropology
- Notable works: The Navajo Door

Dorothea Cross Leighton (September 2, 1908 – August 15, 1989) was an American social psychiatrist and a founder of the field of medical anthropology. Leighton held faculty positions at Cornell University and the University of North Carolina and she was the founding president of the Society for Medical Anthropology. She and her husband, Alexander Leighton, wrote The Navajo Door, which has been described as the first written work in applied medical anthropology.

== Early life and education ==
Born Dorothea Cross in Lunenburg, Massachusetts, on September 2, 1908, she attended Bryn Mawr College, where she studied chemistry and biology. She graduated in 1930, and went to work at the Johns Hopkins Hospital as a technician. After two years, she matriculated at the Johns Hopkins School of Medicine, and graduated with her MD in 1936. She married a classmate, Alexander Leighton, in 1937 (she did not receive an appointment at Johns Hopkins; he did) and had two children, then divorced in 1965.

== Career and research ==
After earning a medical degree, Leighton studied anthropology at Creighton University. She was a resident physician in psychiatry at a clinic in Baltimore. In 1940, Leighton did fieldwork with Navajo people in Arizona and New Mexico, affiliated with the University of Chicago. She and her husband also did fieldwork in Alaska; both studies were part of an effort to incorporate anthropological methods into psychiatric interviews. In 1942, Leighton published a book that compared the Navajo philosophy of health with that of whites. She then served as a physician with the Indian Personality Research Project from 1942 to 1945. During this time, she worked with Clyde Kluckhohn and John Adair. Her 1944 book The Navajo Door, with Alexander Leighton, is considered "the earliest example of applied medical anthropology".

She was a professor of child development and family relations at Cornell University from 1949 to 1952. While at Cornell, she studied psychiatry in a rural context, via fieldwork in Stirling County, Nova Scotia. Around 1960, she traveled to Nigeria to do similar fieldwork with Yoruba people, and also did similar studies in Sweden. Leighton then became a professor of public health and anthropology at the University of North Carolina, a position she held from 1965 to 1974, when she retired. She moved to Fresno, California, and continued to be somewhat involved in academia. In 1977, she was a lecturer at the University of California, San Francisco, and from 1981 to 1982 she was a visiting professor at the University of California, Berkeley, her last academic position before her death on August 15, 1989.

== Legacy ==
Leighton founded the Society for Medical Anthropology while a professor at the University of North Carolina. She was its first president.
