= Comet (Lincoln Park) =

Wooden roller coaster

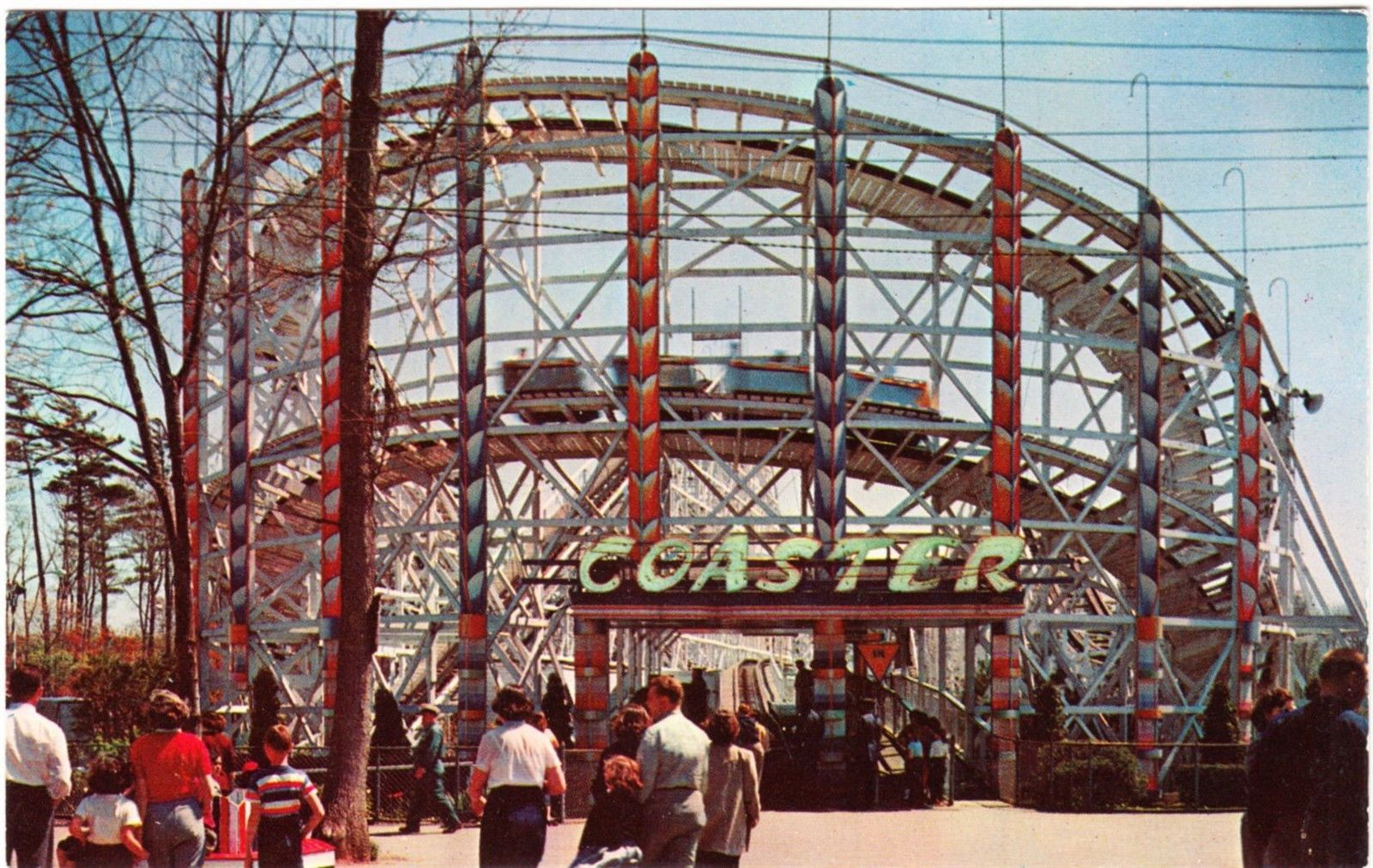
- Comet in 1950s

Lincoln Park
- Location: Lincoln Park
- Coordinates: 41.636170°N 71.043162°W
- Status: Removed
- Opening date: October 1946
- Closing date: September 29, 1987

General statistics
- Type: Wood
- Manufacturer: National Amusement Devices
- Designer: Edward Leis, Vernon Keenan
- Lift/launch system: Chain lift
- Height: 65 ft (20 m)
- Length: 3,000 ft (910 m)
- Speed: 55 mph (89 km/h)
- Duration: 2:10
- Comet at RCDB

The Comet was a twister-layout wooden roller coaster that operated in the now defunct Lincoln Park in Massachusetts. It operated from 1946 until 1987.

== History ==
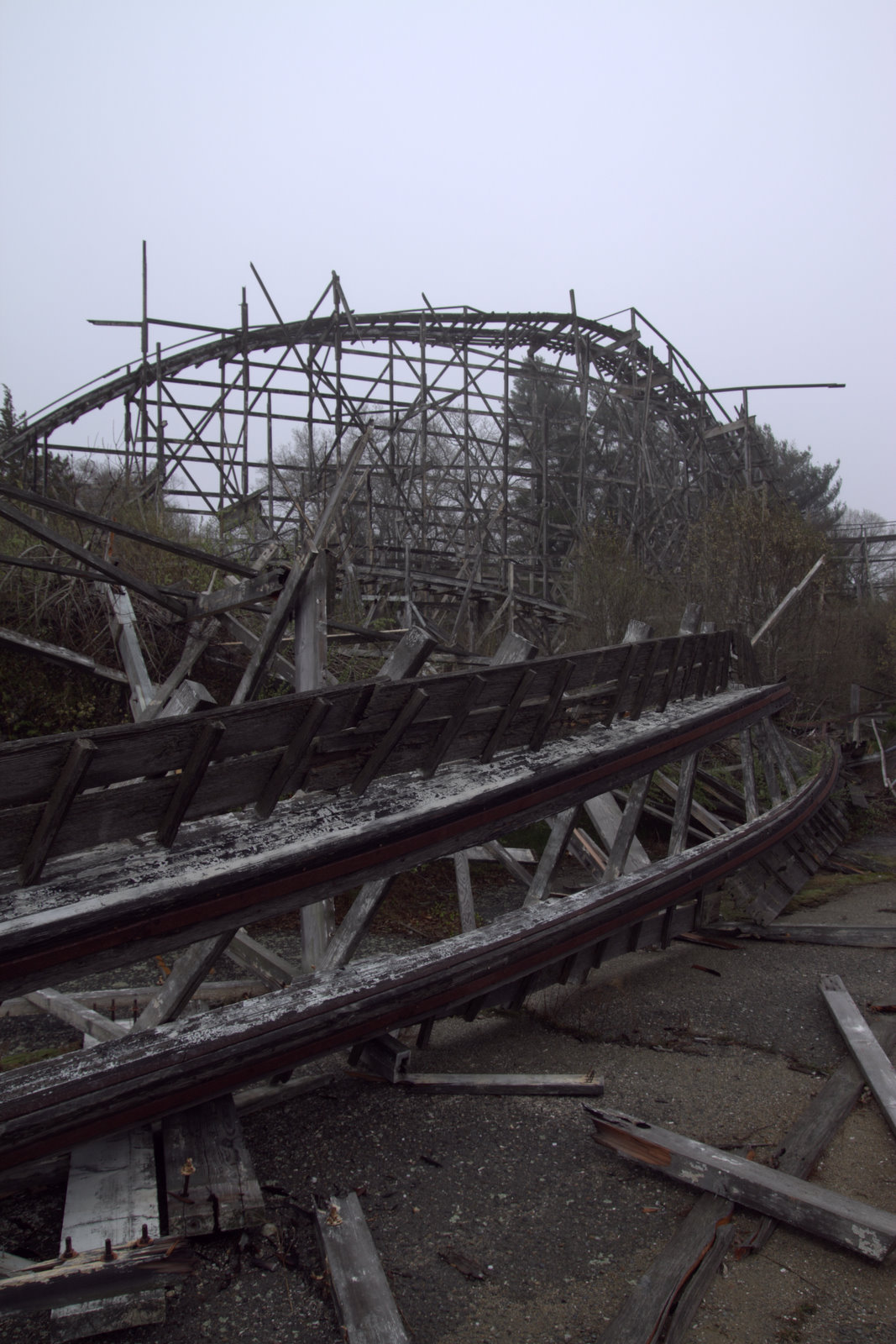
Remains of the Comet in 2011

The coaster, originally named Cyclone, was designed by Edward Leis and Vernon Keenan and built by National Amusement Devices. The ride was 3000 feet long, and had a top speed of 55 mph and lasted two minutes and ten seconds. It had two trains, each with five cars, arranged with two per row, two rows per car, for a total of 20 riders per train.

The coaster was originally designed to run with five car trains, but during the last years of its operation, they were shortened to four to allow the last carts to be used for spare parts. The roller coaster stood abandoned for 25 years until it was demolished on July 11, 2012.

In 1964, a man died on the roller coaster as a result of standing up as it ascended the first lift.

In 1968, the rear car of one of the trains became disconnected while ascending the final hill, causing it to roll backward. As a result, the train derailed, dropping six people to the ground ten feet below with minor injuries. The mishap was possibly caused by the passengers rocking the car, damaging the coupler. The original trains were removed and replaced with newer Century Flyer trains. During the era when Hoffman owned Lincoln Park, safety became a bigger concern, and more accidents on the Comet resulted in its closing.

On August 17, 1986, an electrician working on the coaster fell more than 55 feet causing immediate death. On September 29, 1987, four people were injured when the braking system failed. The cars jackknifed into the roller coaster wood and as a result, Comet was closed.

The trains were purchased by Little Amerricka Amusement Park when the ride closed. Little Amerricka also expressed interest in buying the coaster in 2002. The owner of Lincoln Park at the time, Walter Bronhard, offered to sell the coaster for $90,000, but received no buyers. Various efforts were made to save the coaster; however, the coaster's lift had partially collapsed in January 2005 due to rot. Little Amerricka proposed to build an exact replica of the ride but it was cancelled. Having abandoned all proposals and future plans, the remainder of the Comet was demolished on July 11, 2012.
