= Flyer Comet (Whalom Park) =

Roller coaster

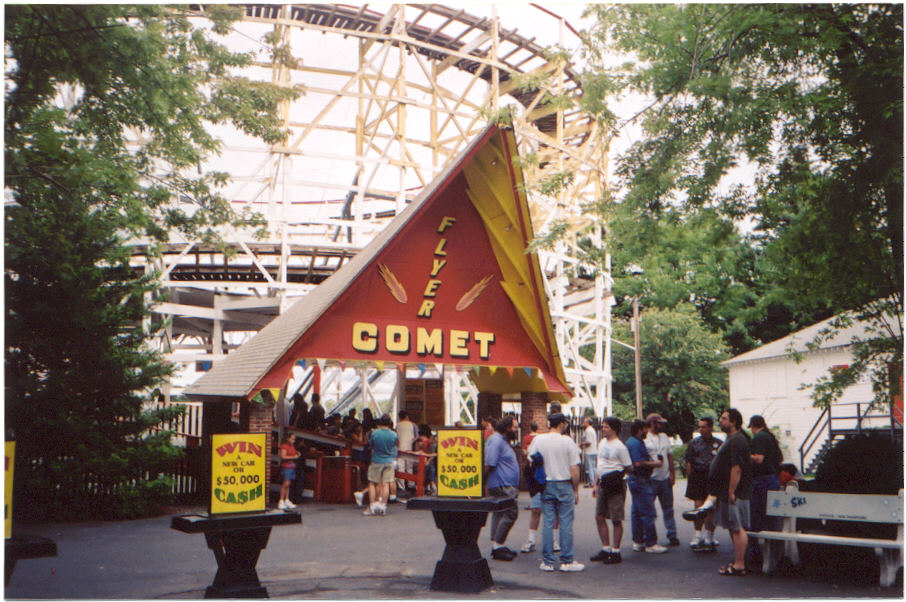
- Entry to the coaster

Whalom Park
- Location: Whalom Park
- Coordinates: 42.576193°N 71.745996°W
- Status: Removed
- Opening date: 1940
- Closing date: 2000

General statistics
- Type: Wood
- Manufacturer: National Amusement Devices
- Designer: Vernon Keenan
- Height: 70 ft (21 m)
- Length: 2,640 ft (800 m)
- Speed: 40 mph (64 km/h)
- Duration: 1:50
- Flyer Comet at RCDB

Flyer Comet was a wooden roller coaster located at Whalom Park in Lunenburg, Massachusetts. The roller coaster was built in 1940 and operated until is permanent closure in 2000. In 2006, after the lift motor and part of its electronics were gutted, Flyer Comet was demolished. The tracks were then reclaimed by the park.

== History ==
When the 1923 Shooting Star roller coaster was destroyed in 1938 by a hurricane, Whalom staff hired the National Amusement Device Company and designer Vernon Keenan to create a new coaster for the park. Many parts from the Shooting Star were used to construct the ride, which was then called the Comet. The ride was Whalom Park's third roller coaster since the park opened in 1893, and no new coasters ever replaced it or were added to the park.

Whalom Park was bought by Global Developments in 2001. They started clearing the land on October 10, 2006; the roller coaster was dismantled on October 18. The area was redeveloped into Emerald Estates.

== Themes ==
The entrance to the ride was decorated with shooting stars and comets. The Black Hole tunnel was added over a hilly portion of the track in 1990, and was meant to add to the space theme of the ride.
