= USS Cross =

1944 John C. Butler-class destroyer escort

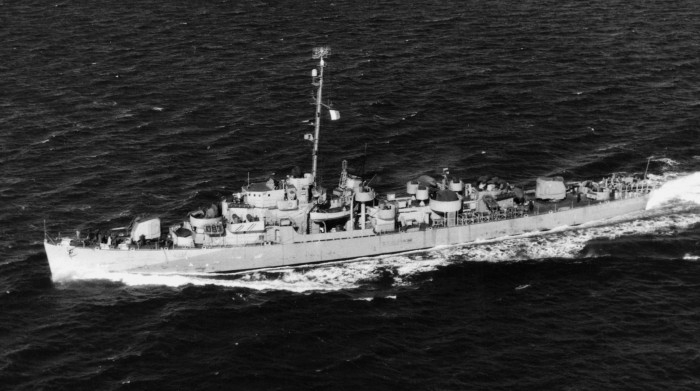

History

United States
- Laid down: 19 March 1944
- Launched: 4 July 1944
- Commissioned: 8 January 1945
- Decommissioned: 14 June 1946
- In service: 1st Naval District, 6 June 1951
- Out of service: 2 January 1958
- Stricken: 1 July 1966
- Fate: Sold for scrapping 5 March 1968

General characteristics
- Displacement: 1,350 long tons (1,372 t)
- Length: 306 ft (93 m) overall
- Beam: 36 ft 10 in (11.23 m)
- Draft: 13 ft 4 in (4.06 m) maximum
- Propulsion: 2 boilers, 2 geared steam turbines, 12,000 shp, 2 screws
- Speed: 24 knots (44 km/h)
- Range: 6,000 nmi at 12 knots (22 km/h)
- Complement: 14 officers, 201 enlisted
- Armament: 2 × 5 in (130 mm); 4 × 40 mm AA (2 × 2); 10 × 20 mm guns AA; 3 × 21 inch (533 mm) torpedo tubes; 1 × Hedgehog; 8 × depth charge projectors; 2 × depth charge tracks

USS Cross (DE-448) was a John C. Butler-class destroyer escort in service with the United States Navy from 1945 to 1946 and from 1951 to 1958. She was sold for scrapping in 1968.

== Namesake ==
Frederick Gushing Cross, Jr. was born on 8 July 1917 in Lunenburg, Massachusetts. He enlisted in the United States Naval Reserve on 22 March 1941, and after aviation training was ordered to a bombing squadron at Naval Air Station DeLand, Florida. Lieutenant (junior grade) Cross was killed in action on 7 August 1943 during an engagement with an enemy submarine. Although he was mortally wounded and his plane had a shattered starboard engine, he continued to attack the submarine, then made a perfect water landing, thus saving the lives of his copilot and radio operator. He was posthumously awarded the Navy Cross.

== History ==
Cross was launched 4 July 1944 by Federal Shipbuilding and Dry Dock Co., Kearny, New Jersey; sponsored by Mrs. D. F. Cross, mother of the late Lieutenant (junior grade) Cross, USNR; and commissioned 8 January 1945.

Departing New York 22 March 1945, Cross called at San Diego, California, before arriving at Pearl Harbor for additional training. She sailed on 8 May escorting a convoy for Ulithi, and from 29 May to 11 September Cross continued to escort vital supply-laden convoys from Ulithi to Okinawa. After repairs at Okinawa, she called at San Diego and Boston, Massachusetts, then put in at Green Cove Springs, Florida, where she was placed out of commission in reserve 14 June 1946.

Recommissioned 6 June 1951, Cross was assigned to the 1st Naval District to serve as a training ship for New England Naval Reservists. She remained in this employment until placed in reserve again 2 January 1958. She was struck from the Navy list on 1 July 1966, and, on 5 March 1968, she was sold for scrapping.

== Military awards ==
Cross was awarded one battle star for World War II service.
