= Zabdiel Adams =

Zabdiel Adams (November 5, 1739 – March 1, 1801), minister of Lunenburg, Massachusetts, was born in Braintree, now Quincy. His father was the uncle of John Adams, second President of the United States. He graduated from Harvard University in 1759. He was ordained September 5, 1764.

== History ==
Adams was eminent as a preacher of the gospel, "often explaining the most important doctrines in a rational and scriptural manner, and enforcing them with plainness and pungency. His language was nervous, and while in his public performances he gave instruction he also imparted pleasure. In his addresses to the throne of grace he was remarkable for pertinency of thought and readiness of utterance. Though by bodily constitution he was liable to irritation, yet he held no ill will. His heart was easily touched by the afflictions of others and his sympathy and benevolence prompted him to administer relief, when in his power."

About the year 1774, he wrote a pamphlet maintaining, without authority from the Cambridge Platform of 1648, that a pastor has a negative upon the proceedings of the church. Some ministers, who embraced his principles, lost by consequence their parishes. He preached the Dudleian lecture on Presbyterian ordination in 1794.

He published a sermon on the nature, pleasures, and advantages of church music, 1771; on Christian unity, 1772; the election sermon, 1782; on April 19, 1783; at the ordination of Enoch Whipple, 1788.

== Sources ==
- Allen, William. An American Biographical and Historical Dictionary: Containing an Account of the Lives, Characters, and Writings of the Most Eminent Persons in North America From Its First Settlement, and a Summary of the History of the Several Colonies and of the United States. 2nd ed. Boston: Hyde, 1832.
