= Lincoln Park (Dartmouth, Massachusetts) =

Amusement park in North Dartmouth, Massachusetts

Coordinates: 41°38′10.55″N 71°2′31.95″W

- Previously known as Midway Park; Westport Park
- Interactive map of Lincoln Park
- Location: North Dartmouth, Massachusetts, U.S.
- Status: Defunct
- Opened: 1894
- Closed: December 3, 1987
- Owner: Jay Collins
- General manager: N/A
- Operating season: Year-round
- Area: 42-acre (170,000 m^{2})

Attractions
- Total: 20 (including 2 roller coasters)

Lincoln Park was a park opened in 1894 by the Union Street Railway Company of New Bedford, Massachusetts, located in North Dartmouth, Massachusetts on the border of Westport, Massachusetts on U.S. Highway 6. Lincoln Park closed in 1987 and remained abandoned and vacant until the Comet roller coaster was torn down on July 11, 2012. The park's carousel was relocated to nearby Fall River, Massachusetts, and is still in operation at Battleship Cove.

== History ==
=== Beginnings ===
Lincoln Park used to be known as "Midway Park" or "Westport Park" until a new name was chosen in a lottery.

The Union Street Railway Company created Lincoln Park in 1894 as a way to connect Fall River to New Bedford. 46 acres of land in Dartmouth was purchased and the park began. The park originally had picnic tables, a playground, and several grill stoves for cookouts. This continued into the 1920s, which was when Lincoln Park became more of an amusement park.

In 1941, the facility was purchased by John Collins & Associates for $40,000 ($500,000 inflation adjusted). They invested $150,000 installing a fourteen lane bowling alley and updating an existing dance hall, and added a full complement of amusement park rides.

=== Decline and closure ===
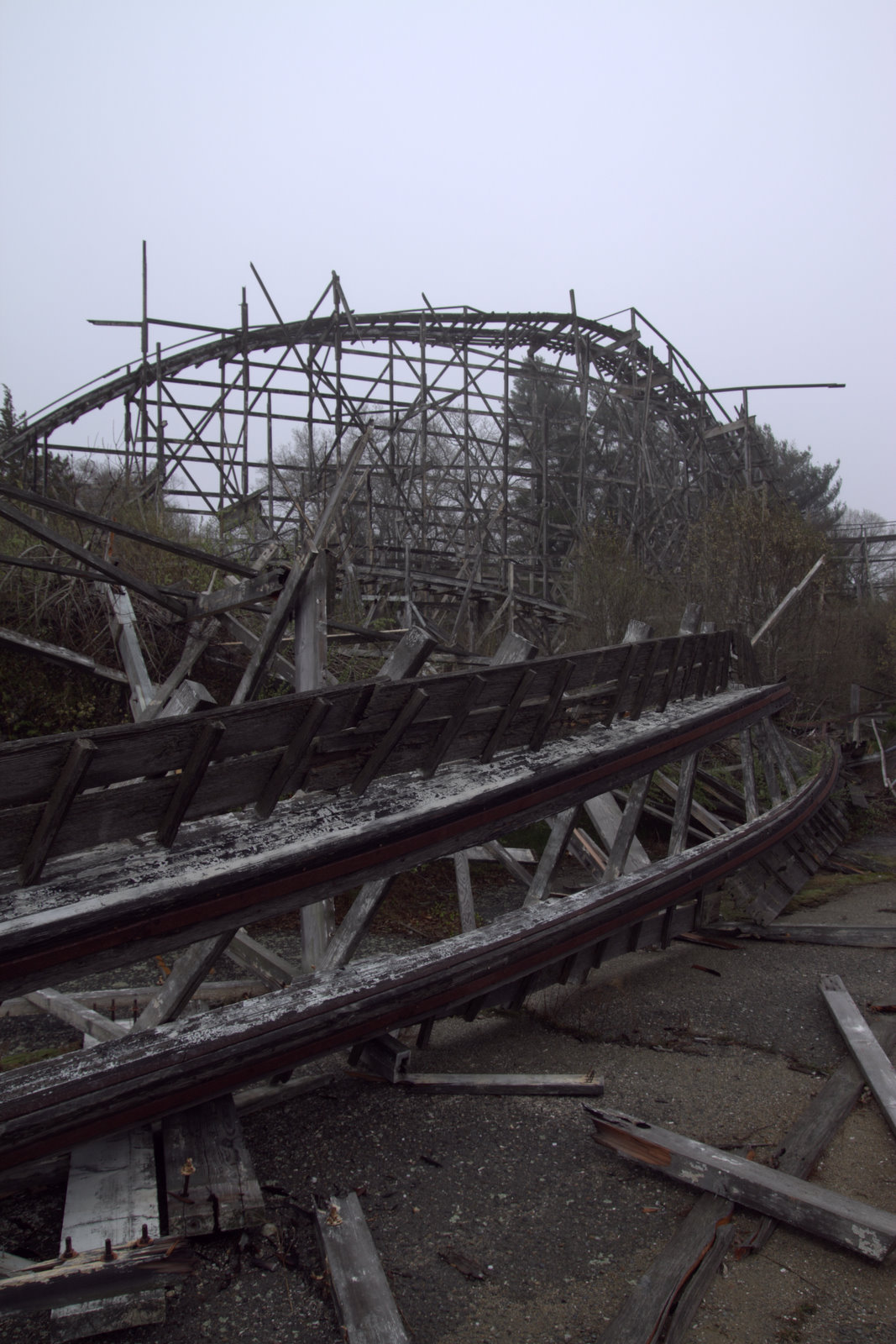
Remains of the Comet roller coaster before its demolition.

The park was successful until the mid-1980s, when larger theme parks started to become more popular. A fatal accident on the park's 1946 "Comet" wooden roller coaster in 1986 caused people to question the safety of the park.

Facing declining attendance, Jay Hoffman, the park's owner, invested $75,000 in updating the park. This plan included moving the park's 1921 carousel to Battleship Cove in Fall River, and dismantling a smaller "kiddy" version of the "Comet" roller coaster. In a May 1987 story from The Providence Journal, he is quoted as saying that the park had been fully inspected and was safe.

However, just four months later on September 29, the braking system on the roller coaster failed, causing one of the cars to jackknife. Although no one was injured, this was the final ride of the coaster.

The park closed December 3, 1987, owing $48,000 in taxes and $13,000 in unpaid police details. Almost all of the rides were dismantled and auctioned off. The park's Ferris wheel was moved to the New Bedford waterfront.

The jack-knifed car remained stuck on the roller coaster track well into the 1990s, until vandals tore it off.

The abandoned park suffered a string of fires after its closing, a total of six as of May 2012. For years the only remaining structures in the park were some badly damaged food buildings and the roller coaster. The coaster's high starting "lift hill" collapsed during a heavy January 2005 snowstorm (Jan 22-26), the roof of the platform collapsed in May 2008 and much of the rear (southern) curve collapsed, probably due to water damage, around mid-May 2009. Two of the remaining buildings near the roller coaster partially collapsed in early 2008, both buildings collapsed by early 2010.

=== Comet ===
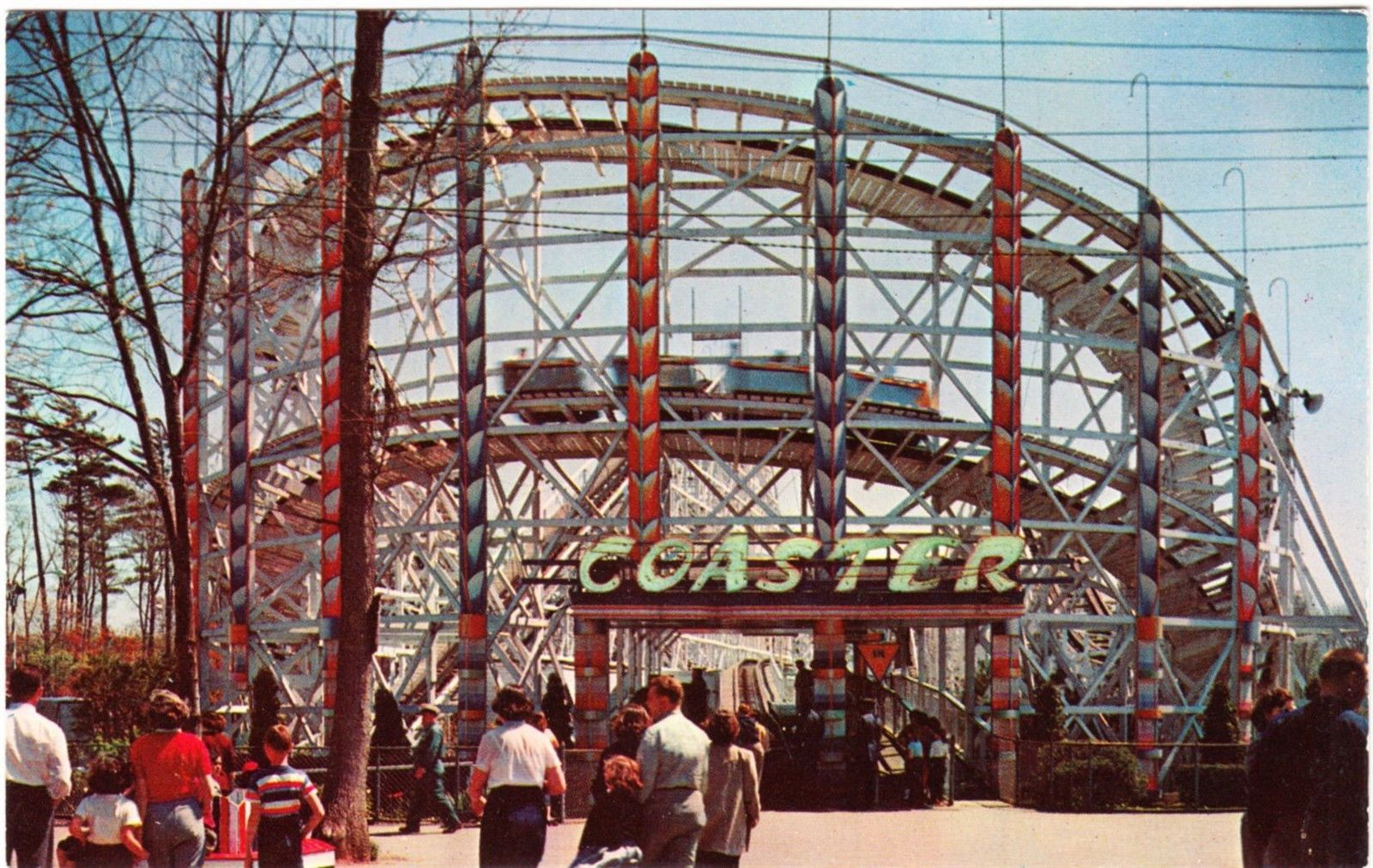
The Comet roller coaster in a 1950s postcard.

The Comet roller coaster was built in 1947 by National Amusement Devices, had a top height of 65 feet, and a top speed of 55 miles per hour.

Several accidents occurred on the Comet between 1964 and 1987. In 1964, a man was killed after he stood up while the coaster was ascending. An accident at the passenger platform in 1964 injured several people in two cars, and a car derailment in 1968 injured nine people. In 1986, a electrician working at the park was killed when he stood up in a car while the coaster was in motion. On September 29, 1987, a car on the Comet jacknifed during a ride and injured four people; The Comet never operated again following the 1987 accident. The coaster was abandoned after the park closed and deteriorated. The remainder of the roller coaster that was left standing was demolished on July 11, 2012.

=== Carousel ===
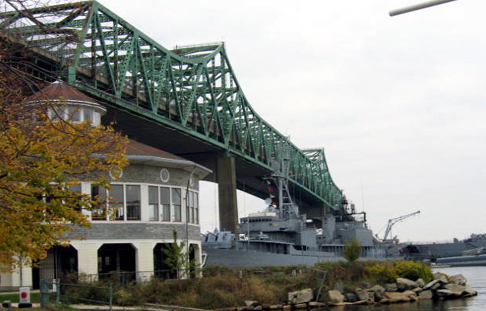
Lincoln Park carousel under the Braga Bridge at Battleship Cove

The carousel was built by the Philadelphia Toboggan Company in 1920 as number 54 of 87 similar carousels, and was erected at Lincoln Park in 1922. After Lincoln Park's closure, the carousel was purchased at an auction for $693,000 by a local Fall River group in November 1986.. A fundraising campaign was held in Fall River to pay for the purchase and to build an enclosure for the carousel, and it opened at Battleship Cove in May 1992.

== Reuse ==
The 42-acre (170,000 m^{2}) site has been converted in part to residential use

In May 2012, developers began clearing shrubbery, rock, and abandoned buildings in the former amusement park.

In July 2012, the Comet roller coaster was demolished. Single family homes, apartment buildings and commercial space will be constructed in its place. The fir wood used for the coaster will be used to make Adirondack chairs that will be sold for charity.

== See also ==
- List of amusement parks in New England
- List of defunct amusement parks
- Amusement ride
- Comet (Lincoln Park)
