= Rockaways' Playland =

Former amusement park in Queens, New York

Coordinates: 40°35′02″N 73°49′07″W

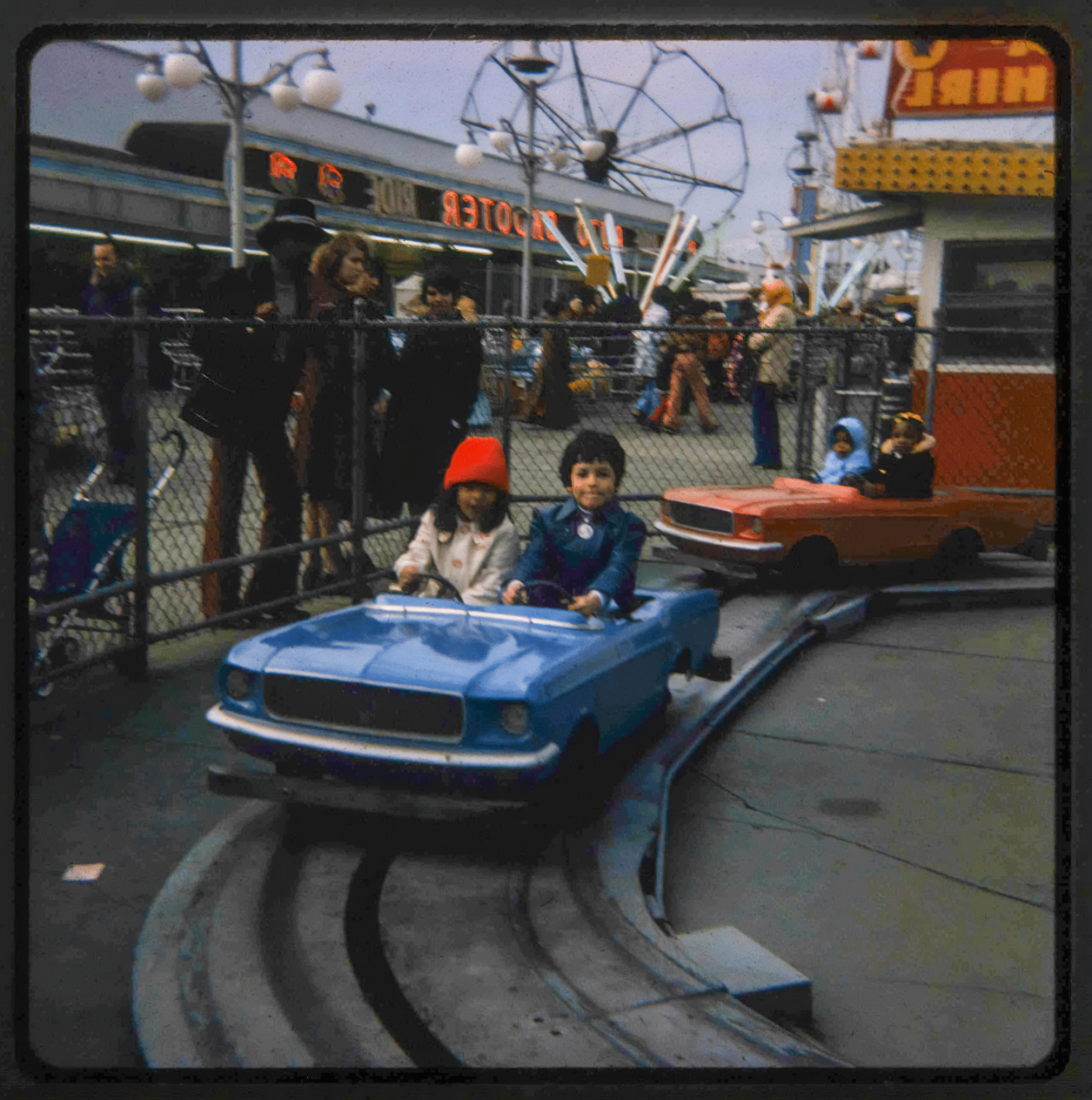
Rockaways Playland, Car Ride, 1977

Rockaways' Playland was an amusement park that operated from 1902 to 1987 in Rockaway Beach in Queens, New York City. Bounded by Beach 97th and Beach 98th Streets between Rockaway Beach Boulevard and the Rockaway Beach and Boardwalk, Rockaways' Playland was created in 1902 by roller coaster designer LaMarcus Adna Thompson. By 1903 a ferry dock was added not far from the park, making it more convenient to reach (from just about everywhere in New York City) than some of the competing amusement parks. The park was sold in 1927 to Robert Katlin, who added amenities such as a gym and swimming pool, and the following year to A. Joseph Geist, who achieved greater success than the previous owners. Between 1928 and 1970, Rockaways' Playland was extremely successful, drawing 175 million visitors. It closed in 1987 due to a sharp increase in the price of insurance.

== History ==
=== Thompson's Amusement Park ===
The park site was originally developed as a resort area in 1876 by William Wainwright.

In 1900, George Tilyou, owner of Steeplechase Park in Brooklyn's Coney Island, purchased land in the Seaside neighborhood along Rockaway Beach. He called the plot "Steeplechase Park". Within a year, Tilyou offered to sell 2 acres (0.81 ha) to LaMarcus Adna Thompson, a roller coaster designer who had been nearly bankrupted when the assassination of William McKinley prevented him from showing his Switchback Railway at the 1901 Pan-American Exposition. Still, Thompson managed to buy the property by 1901 and begin construction on an amusement park.

Thompson's Amusement Park is variously said to have opened in 1901, 1902, or 1903, on land that extended to the Rockaway Beach and Boardwalk. In 1903, a ferry dock was built adjacent to the park, enabling visitors from other boroughs to visit it or one of the other several amusement districts along the beach and boardwalk. By 1905, Thompson was operating the amusement park by himself.

After Thompson died in 1919, his family operated the park until they sold it to a syndicate led by Robert Katlin in December 1927. Katlin opened several facilities and amusements including a new arena, gymnasium, and swimming pool.

=== Geist operation ===
In January 1928, the park was purchased by A. Joseph Geist, a Queens lawyer and businessman who would go on to serve as the president of the Rockaways Chamber of Commerce and on the Board of Higher Education. Renaming it Rockaways' Playland, Geist soon launched an expansion project that added a dance hall, menagerie, and roller coaster. He added numerous attractions in the early 1930s, and by 1936, he was advertising that the park contained 24 distinct attractions. New York City parks commissioner Robert Moses shut the amusement area in 1937, as he intended to build the Shore Front Parkway through the area. A waterfront stretch measuring 200 feet (61 m) by 2.5 miles (4.0 km) was condemned, and Geist lost half of his rides. Moses had also destroyed the nearby bungalows in an unsuccessful attempt to shut down Playland. Following a rebuilding program costing between $3 million and $5 million, Geist reopened Playland in 1939.

Playland saw attendance decrease during World War II. A wartime blackout was applied to the area, which mandated that the park's lights be shut off to avoid enemy detection; the blackout was lifted in August 1945. More attractions, including a kiddie park named Joytown, were added in 1949, followed by the installation of new lighting systems the following year under a $1 million modernization program. Visitors continued to arrive from various places in the New York metropolitan area such as Jersey City, Lower Manhattan, and Yonkers. Boats to Sheepshead Bay, Brooklyn would start operating in 1954, followed by another ferry service to Westchester in 1964.

Throughout the 1950s, Playland hosted numerous events and special occasions. One New York Times article in 1953 described how six hundred orphans were taken to Playland. When Geist died in 1960, his son Richard took over the park and added numerous contests, such as beauty pageants every Monday evening and children's contests each Saturday afternoon. Playland saw a small attendance decrease during the 1964 New York World's Fair, hosted in nearby Flushing Meadows–Corona Park, though attendance quickly returned to normal levels after the fair. By 1970, Playland had attracted 175 million visitors in the years since A. Joseph Geist had purchased the park. Attendance began to decline in the late 1970s as the rides became more dated.

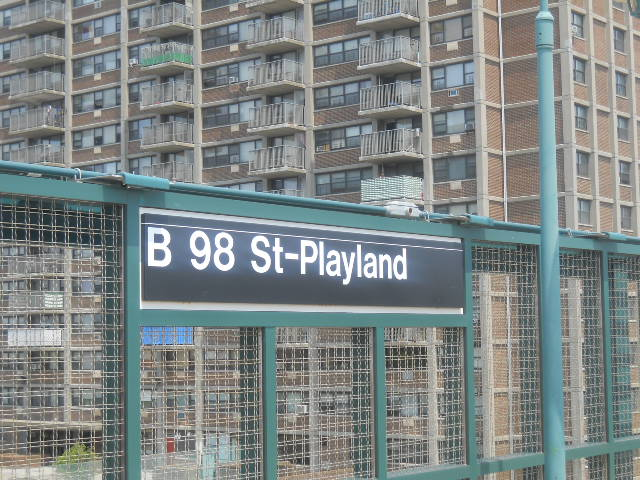
"Playland" sign at the Beach 98th Street station

The 1985 season was the last operating season for Playland, though at the time, Richard Geist did not intend for the park to close permanently. The following year, insurance premiums increased eightfold, from $50,000 in 1985 to $408,000 in 1986. At that time, Geist decided not to reopen the park. Upon Playland's closure, a housing development was planned on Playland's site. The land was still vacant in 1995. While the site was developed by 2003, the Beach 98th Street station of the New York City Subway still bore the name "Playland".

== Attractions ==
At its opening, Thompson's Amusement Park included a steeplechase-style ride, where patrons would race along a track on horse-shaped vehicles, as well as a 1,000-foot-long (300 m) bathhouse on the boardwalk. The park also included a midway with a funhouse, Skee-Ball ramp, and shooting gallery when it opened. The first roller coaster in the park was added in 1924 and was called the Gravity Wonder. A "tent city" with cabanas was located on the northern part of Thompson's Amusement Park.

In 1928, a 165-foot-long (50 m) Olympic-size swimming pool was added to Playland, being used for Summer Olympic tryouts. An 8,000-seat arena was also added; before being torn down in 1930, it was used for circuses, as well as for church services on Sundays and for boxing matches on Fridays. A dance hall, gymnasium, and menagerie, were also added, and a 5,500-locker bathhouse was built.

In 1930 Geist added a Noah's Ark style attraction, with a setting resembling Mount Ararat, on the arena's site. The ark was a walk-through exhibit that featured "the sounds of rain, thunder, and Noah giving orders". Other additions in the early 1930s included flat rides such as the Rig-a-Jig, Leaping Lena, Cave O'Laffs, and the Pretzel. A wooden roller coaster called the Atom Smasher was added in 1938. Designed by Vernon Keenan, it measured 3,000 feet (910 m) long and had a maximum height of 70 feet (21 m).

== In popular culture ==
The Atom Smasher was featured in the 1952 film This Is Cinerama. The release of This Is Cinerama and its popularity and positive reception brought thousands of visitors to Playland. Playland was also shown in the 1982 movie Sophie's Choice.

An employee of Playland was, in that capacity, a guest on What's My Line? on June 1, 1958.
