= Jonathan Bourne Jr. (merchant) =

American merchant and whaling agent (1811-1889)

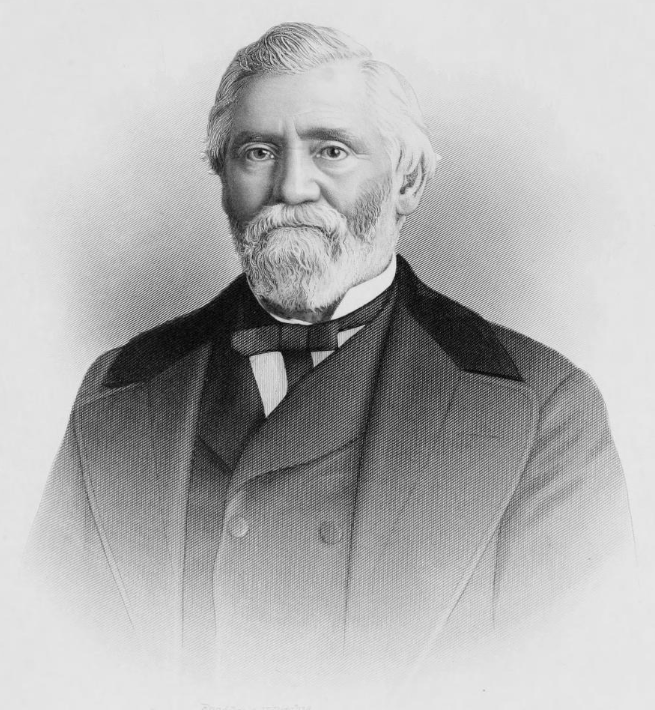
- Born: March 25, 1811; Sandwich, Massachusetts, United States
- Died: August 7, 1889 (aged 78); New Bedford, Massachusetts
- Occupations: Businessman and politician
- Known for: Namesake of Bourne, Massachusetts
- Political party: Whig; Republican

Signature
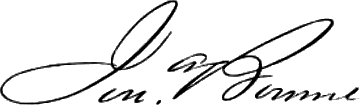

Jonathan Bourne Jr. (1811–1889) was a whaling agent and merchant who lived and worked in New Bedford, Massachusetts.

== Early life ==
Jonathan Bourne Jr. was born in Sandwich, Massachusetts on March 25, 1811, the tenth of eleven children, and was raised on a farm there. When he was seventeen, he moved to New Bedford and entered the grocery business. By the time he was 24, he had married into the Nye-Howland family and had started investing in whaling ships.

== Business ventures ==
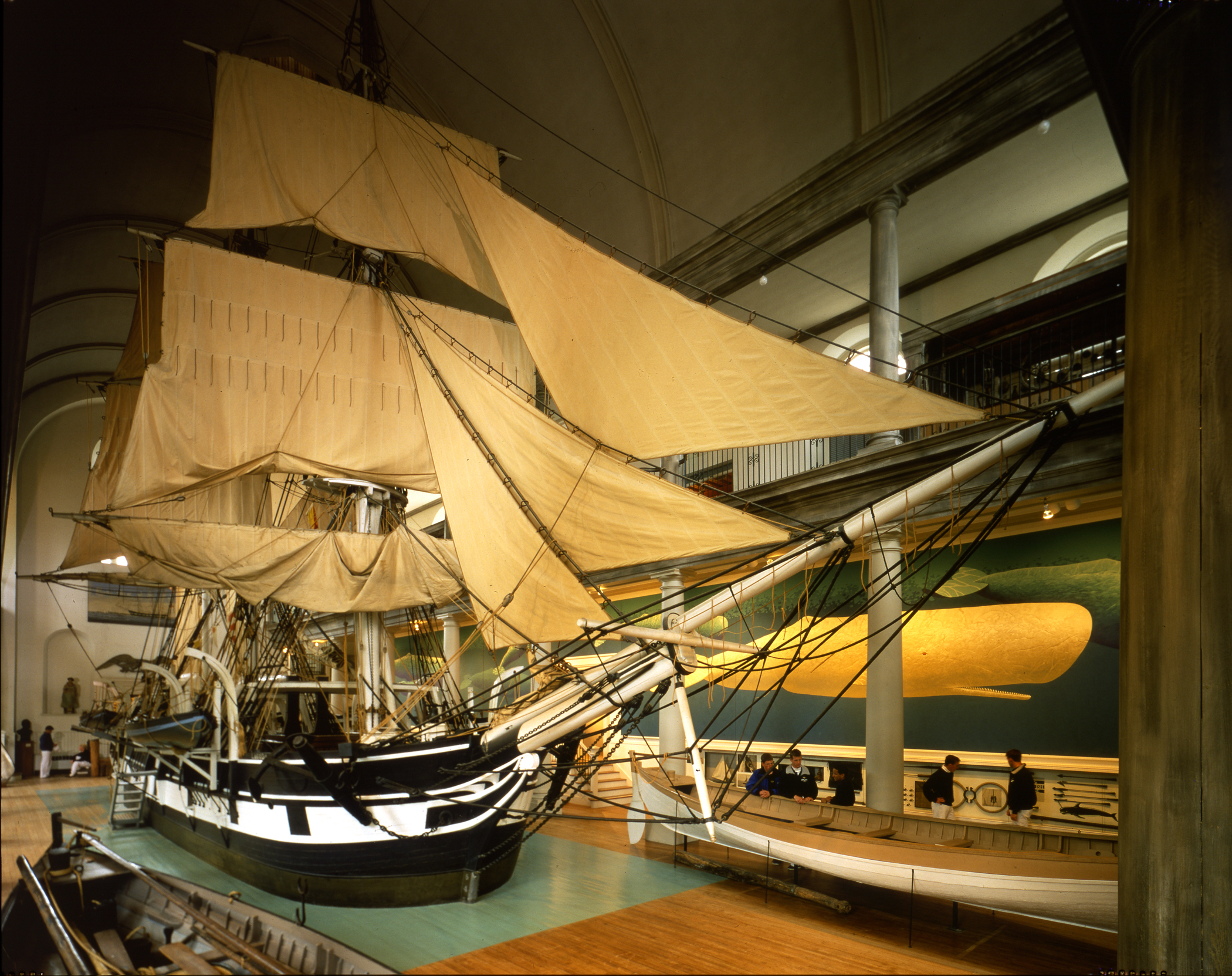
The half-scale model of Lagoda in the Bourne Building of the New Bedford Whaling Museum is based on Jonathan Bourne's ship, and was commissioned by his daughter Emily Bourne.

In 1841, he purchased the Lagoda, a merchant vessel he converted to a whaling ship. The Lagoda became the most lucrative whaling ship in New Bedford's history. Bourne would serve as agent for 24 vessels and own stock in 22 more.

He also invested in the Gosnold Mill, Hathaway Mill, Bourne Mill, and Acushnet Mill. He also directed the Union Street Railway Company, the Western Railroad, and the New Bedford, Vineyard, and Nantucket Steamboat Company.

== Civic engagement ==
Bourne was initially a member of the Whig Party, and later became a Republican. He was instrumental in the election of Abraham Lincoln. He helped West Sandwich achieve township, and that town was named Bourne after him.

== Death ==
Bourne died at his home in New Bedford on August 7, 1889.
