= Union Street Railway Company =

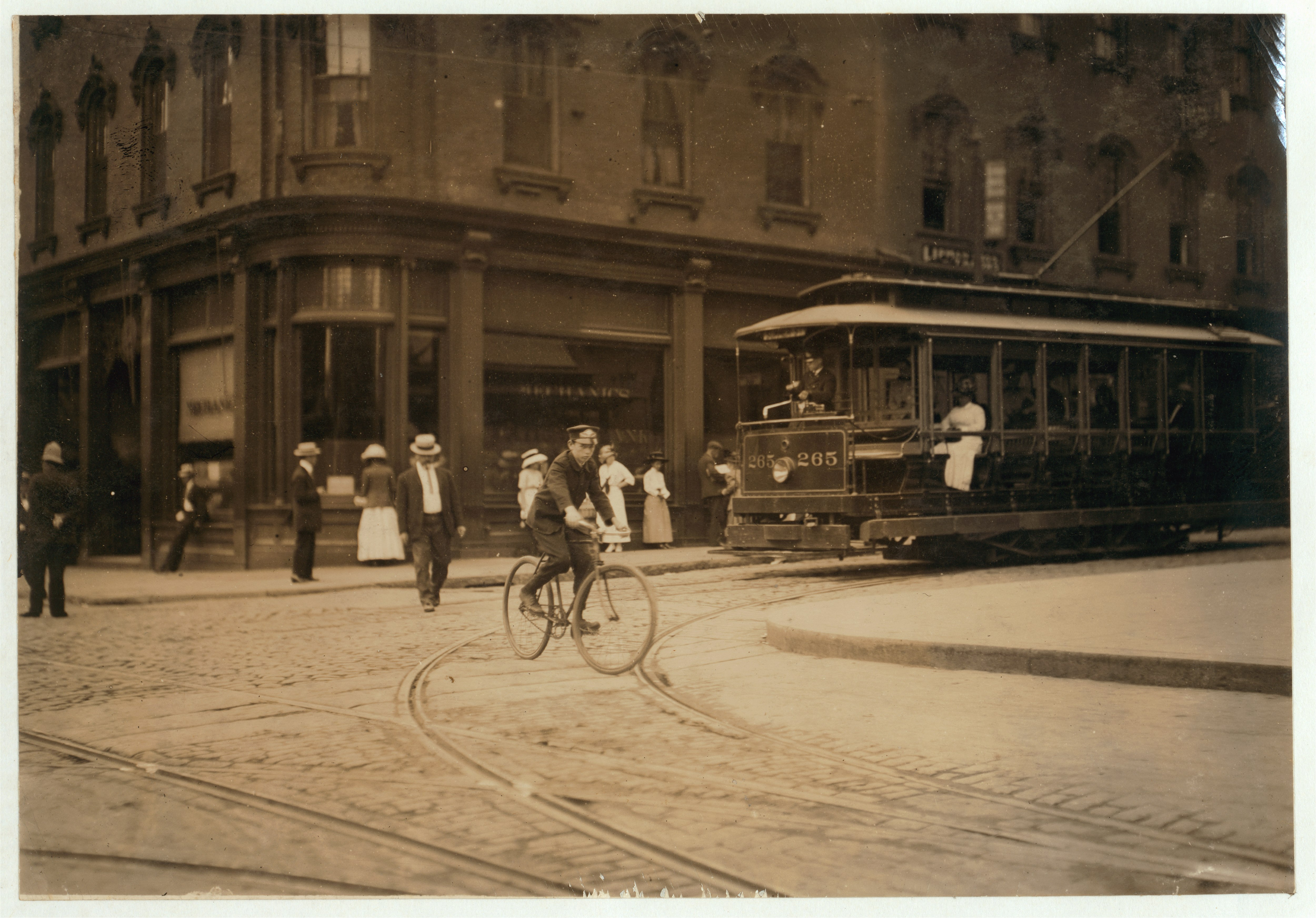
A photo taken by Lewis Hine in 1911 with a streetcar in New Bedford.

The Union Street Railway Company (abbreviated Union St. Ry.) was a streetcar company centered in New Bedford, Massachusetts. It was formed from the New Bedford & Fairhaven Street Railway in 1887. It started using electric streetcars in 1890.

== History ==
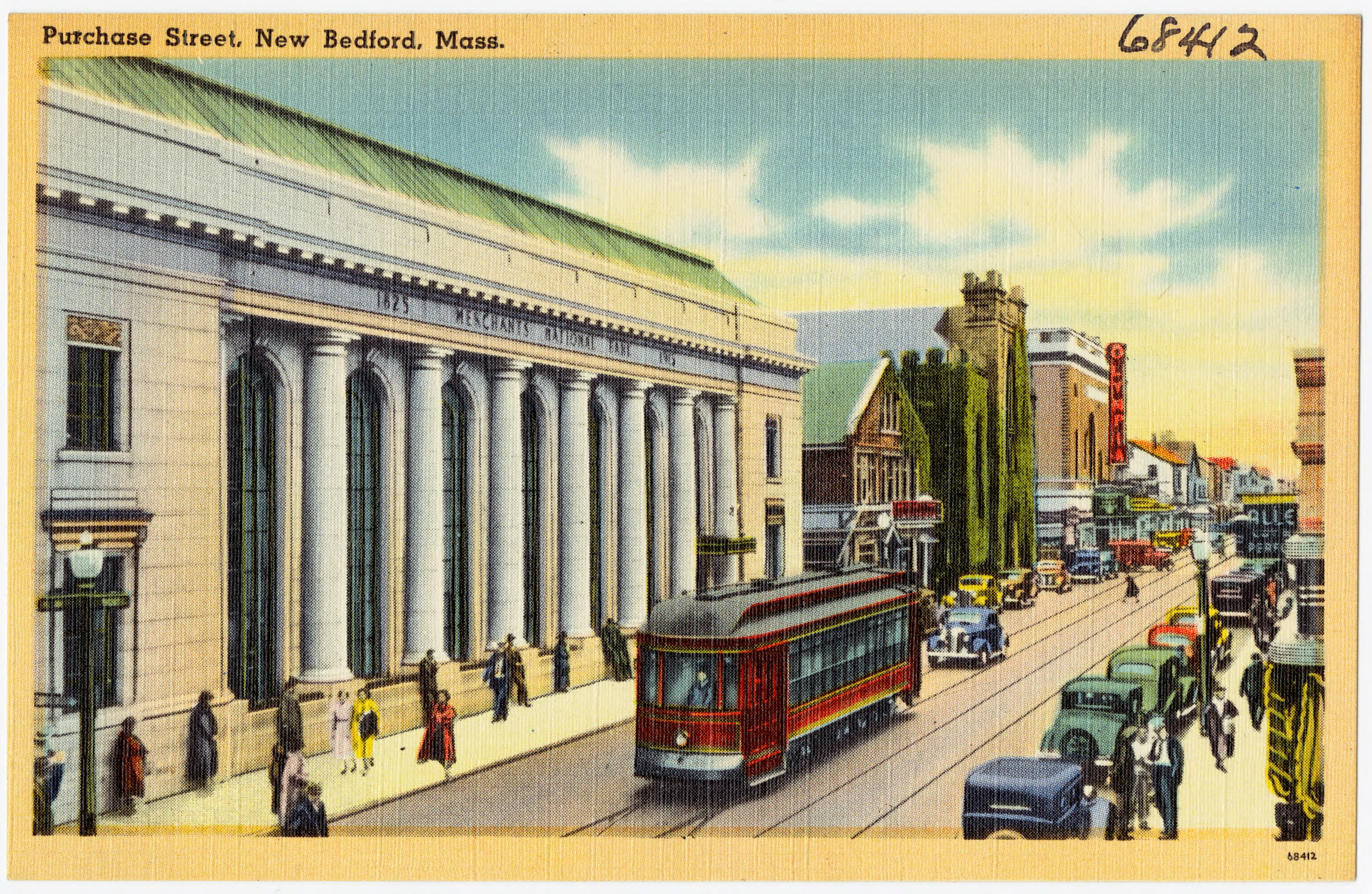
A streetcar on Purchase Street depicted on a postcard.

It operated a railway post office streetcar route connecting New Bedford and Fall River to the main railroad station in Providence, RI. The whaling agent and merchant Jonathan Bourne Jr. (1811–1889) directed the Union Street Railway Company in addition to other ventures.

As of 1901, it owned 31 miles of track in New Bedford and its suburbs and operated 70 cars in the summer and 39 in the winter.

The Union Street Railway Carbarn, Repair Shop was listed on the National Register of Historic Places in 1978.
