= Whalom Park =

Former amusement park in Lunenburg, Massachusetts, United States

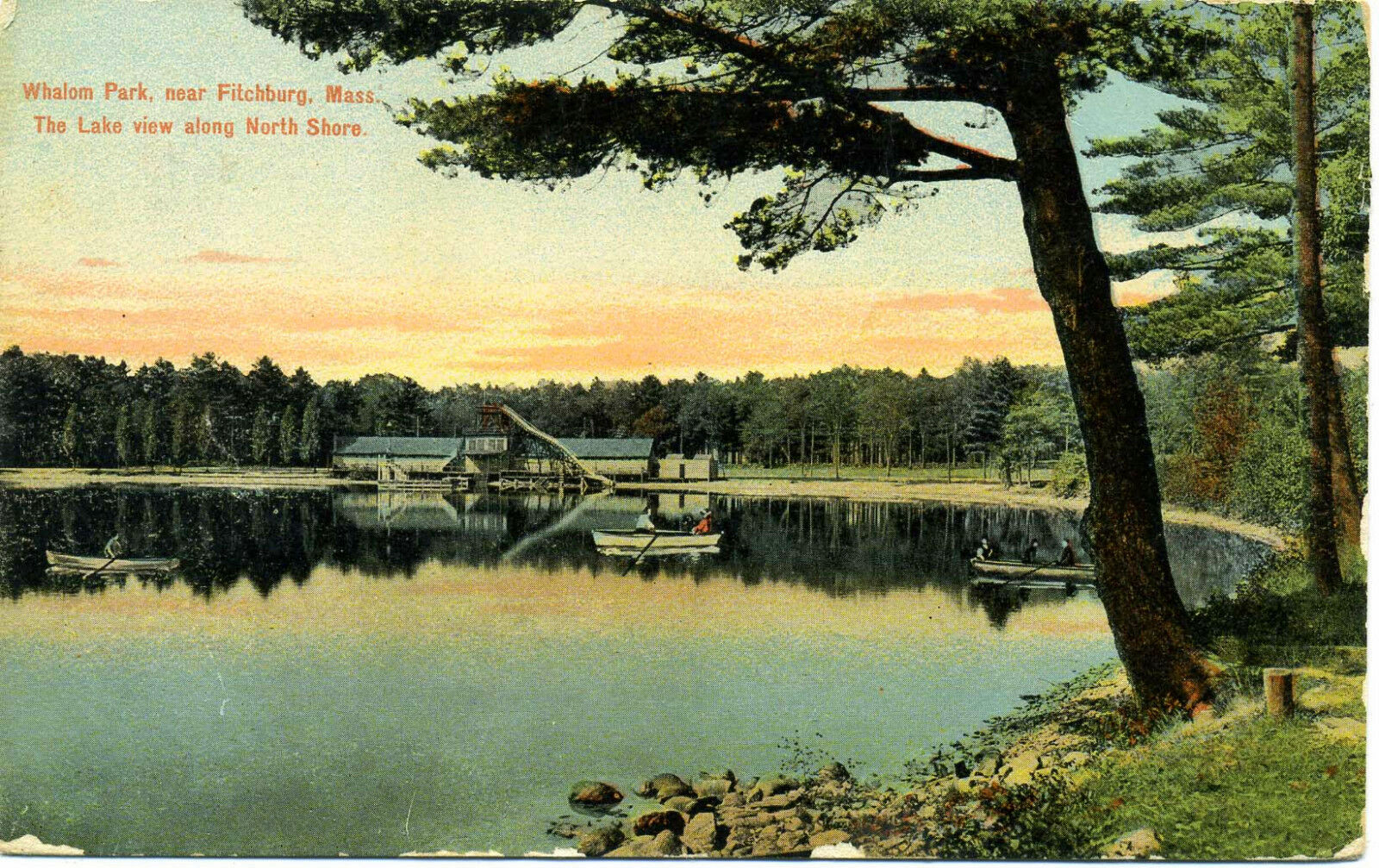
- Whalom Park, circa 1915
- Interactive map of Whalom Park
- Location: Lunenburg, Massachusetts, U.S.
- Coordinates: 42°34′32.02″N 71°44′47.64″W
- Status: Defunct
- Opened: 1893
- Closed: September 4, 2000
- Slogan: For a Whale of a Time!
- Operating season: Late April-Mid October

Attractions
- Total: 25
- Roller coasters: 1
- Water rides: 1

Whalom Park was an amusement park located on Lake Whalom in Lunenburg, Massachusetts, that operated from 1893 to 2000. The site was redeveloped into a 240-unit apartment complex.

== History ==
Whalom Park was established in 1893 by the Fitchburg & Leominster Street Railway as a traditional, English-style park of gardens and walking paths. At the time of its last day of operations in 2000, Whalom was known as the 13th oldest amusement park in the United States, as well as the second-oldest trolley park in the world. The park had been in continuous seasonal operation for 107 years.

The "Flyer Comet" wooden roller coaster was one of the park's best-known rides. Most remaining structures at the park, including the Flyer Comet, were demolished in October 2006 to make way for development.

== Rides and Attractions ==
Name	Manufacturer	Year Added	Year Removed	Notes
Whalom Park Carousel	Looff	1914	2000	Featured 2 Looff Sea Dragons. Broken up at auction April 15, 2000
Ferris wheel	Eli Bridge	1950s	2000	
Flyer Comet	Philadelphia Toboggan Company	1940	2006	
Flying Scooters	Bisch Rocco	1950s	2000	
The Looper	Allan Herschell	1967	2000	AKA: The Hamster Cages. Despite common belief, this ride was not purchased by Knoebels; Knoebels purchased theirs from a traveling carnival.
Octopus	Eyerly Aircraft Company	1967	1986	Parts of this ride were still sitting in back of the maintenance shop when the park closed in 2000
Paratrooper	Frank Hrubetz & Company	1963	2000	
Roto-Jets		1964	2000	
Giant Slide		1969	2000	
Satellite Jets	Kasper Klaus	1961	2000	Originally located at Mountain Park in Holyoke, MA, a similar former trolley park which closed in 1987.
Scrambler	Eli Bridge	1968	2000	
Sea Dragon	Chance Morgan	1963	2000	
Tilt-a-whirl	Sellner Manufacturing	1958	2000	
Tumble Bug	Traver Engineering	1967	2000	Sold To Edaville Railroad but never assembled. Sold as scrap metal in 2010.
Turnpike	Streco	1959	1990	Replaced in the early 1990s by two Honda go-karts due to maintenance issue, Honda go-karts were in the park until the park closed in 2000.
Train Ride	Iron Horse Company by Allan Herschell	1960s	2000	Sold
The Whip	W.F. Mangels	1920s	2000	the ride when it first opened was outside in 1920s but in 1957 they added a canopy to the ride and it stayed there till 2000 when the ride was removed.
Yo-Yo	Chance Morgan	1962	2000	
Skating Rink		1906	2006	
Arcade		1960s	2000	The Building that held the arcade was originally the park's Candle Pin Bowling alley.
Funhouse		1955	1970	
Ball Room		1933	2002	Destroyed by arson, March 2, 2002.
Silly Savage		1964	2000	Silly Savage was one of the park mascots at Whalom Park; he was a lion with a top hat.
Super Chick		1980s	2000	Another mascot.
Simon Looneybear		1969	1985	Another mascot. Black bear.
Wally Whalom		1950s	2000	Wally Whalom was also a mascot at the park, but unlike Silly Savage and Super Chick in costumes, he was a clown.
Barnaby, The Walking Talking Puppet		1960s	2000	Barnaby was a puppet who gave shows to guests around the park.
Whalom Park Center Stage		1969	2000	The Whalom Park Center Stage was an outdoor theater for shows that attracted guests.
Kiddieland		1963	2000	Kiddieland was a section of the park for younger children where there were rides designated for younger kids and a small theater for puppet shows.
Whalom Park Cafe Restaurant		1940	2000	There was a sit down restaurant called "Whalom Park Cafe" in the park besides the other food stands that were inside Whalom Park.
Mini Golf Land		1959	2000	Mini Golf Land was a miniature golf course that was located near The Whip
Picnic groves		1893	2000	The picnic groves had picnic tables and a pavilion, and a small playground. The picnic tables were sold at auction.
Go Carts		1980s	2000	Sold
Waterpark		1983	2000	Whalom Park had its own waterpark with waterslides in it.
Pirates Den		1950s	1981	it was a dark ride with pirates-themed scenes and special effects in 1981 it got destroyed by a fire so they never rebuilt it got replaced by a new flat ride called Luv Machine.
Luv Machine		1983	1980s	a flat ride that replaced the pirates den dark ride it got removed because of declining popularity and maintenance issues it got replaced by new Kiddieland.

=== Gallery ===
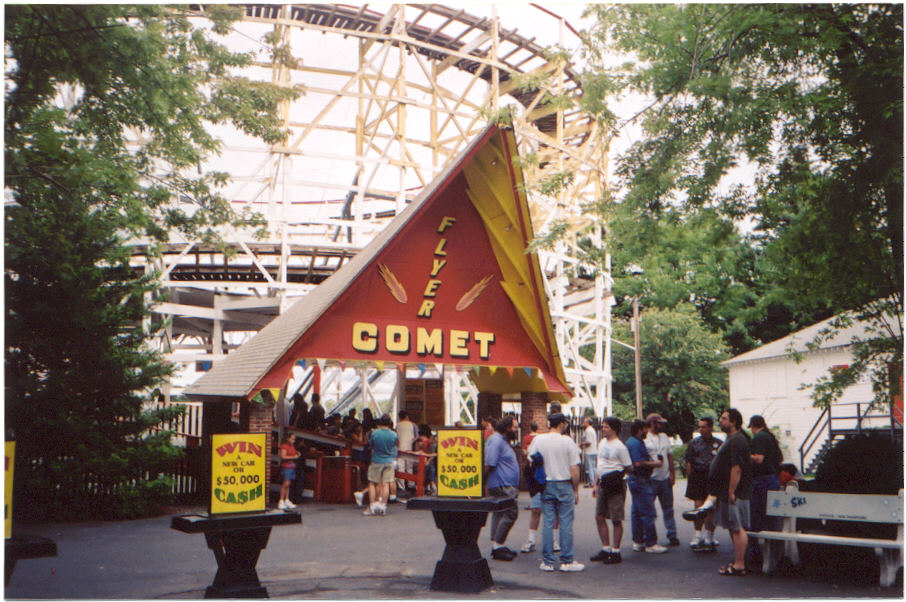
The Entrance To The Flyer Comet

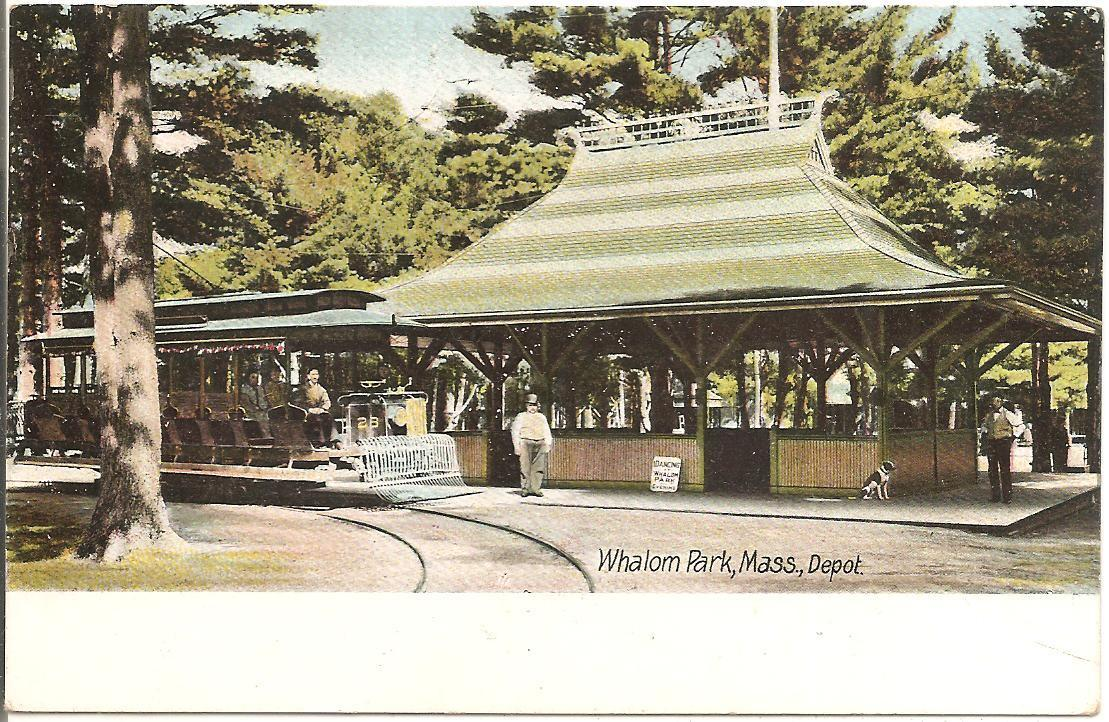
The Whalom Park Trolley Station, c.1900s

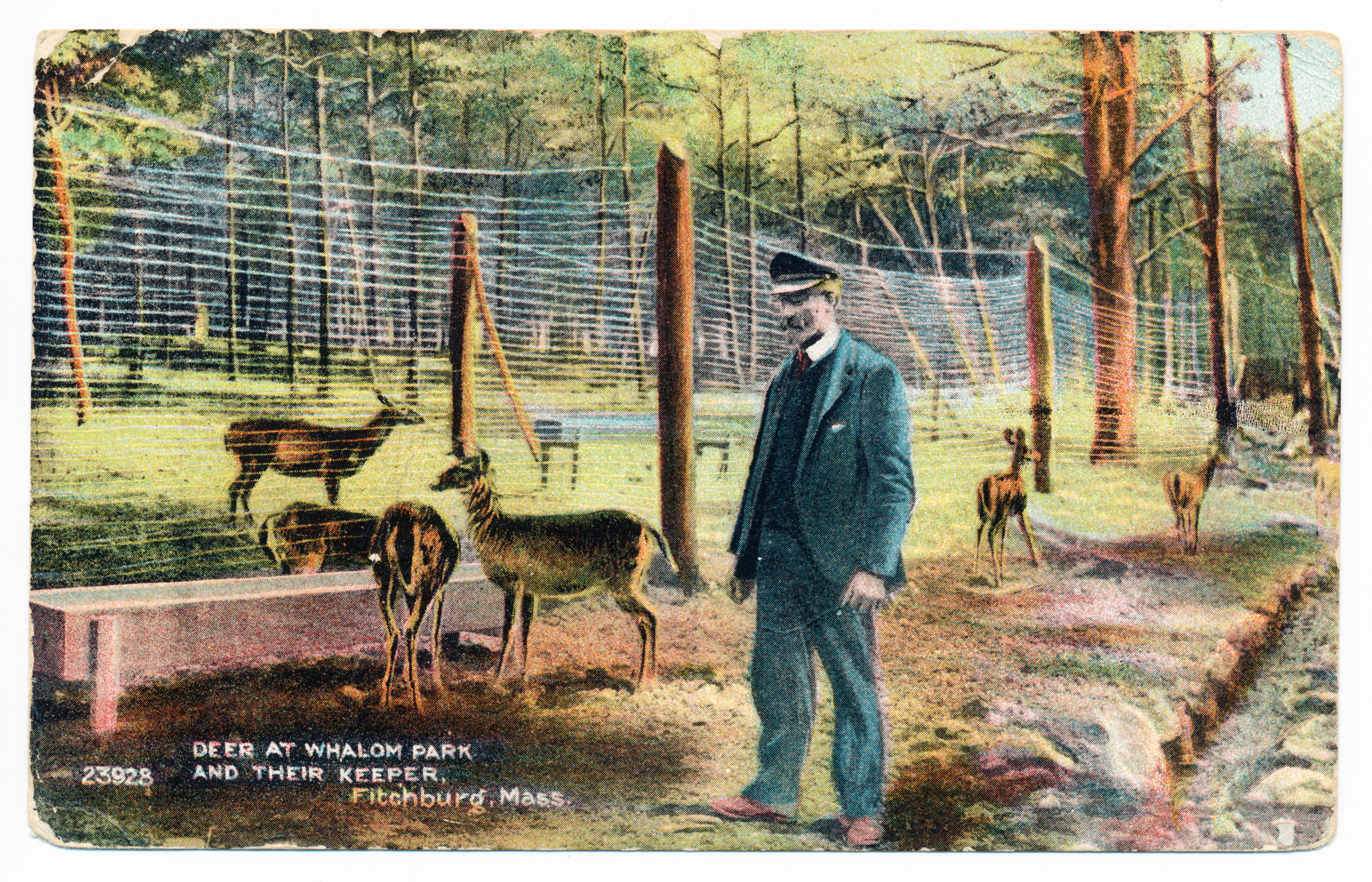
Postcard mailed in 1908 with a caption, "Deer at Whalom Park and Their Keeper, Fitchburg, Mass."

== Appearances in pop culture ==
The music video for the song "Touch and Go" by The Cars was shot at Whalom Park in 1982.

== TV advertisement jingle ==
There were two versions of the jingle:

First Version

If you're looking for something exciting to do!
Then Whalom Park is the place for you!
With lots of rides and loads of fun!
Whalom Park's for everyone!
For fun and excitement!
A place to unwind, happpynesss
Whalom Park, for a whale of a time!
Whalom Park, you'll have a good time!

Second Version

If you need excitement, then come for the fun!
Whalom Park, it's for everyone!
Amusement rides and water slides!
Whalom Park, it's family sized!
Picnics and good times!
Rides, games, and shows!
Whalom's got it!
C'mon let's go!
Great for the family, it's one of a kind!
Whalom Park!
For a whale of a time!

== Land Redevelopment ==
In 2006, Whalom Park was fully demolished and in 2010 was redeveloped into a 240-unit apartment complex. In a nod to the former amusement park, the street within the complex was named Carousel Lane. The development, which was initially called Emerald Place was sold in 2022 for $76M and rebranded as Arrive Lunenburg.

== The Whalom Park Experience ==
In 2023, the New Whalom Cooperative, a consumer co-op dedicated to the preservation of the Whalom amusement park past, present, and future, hosted a "Whalom Park Experience" pop-up event at Doyle Field in Leominster, Massachusetts. In partnership with Manuel Amusements, the three-day July 2023 event featured rides such as a scrambler, swings, carousel, slide, and four kiddie rides with games including skeeball and balloon chance games.

== See also ==
List of amusement parks in New England
List of defunct amusement parks
Amusement ride
