= Lunenburg, Massachusetts =

- Town
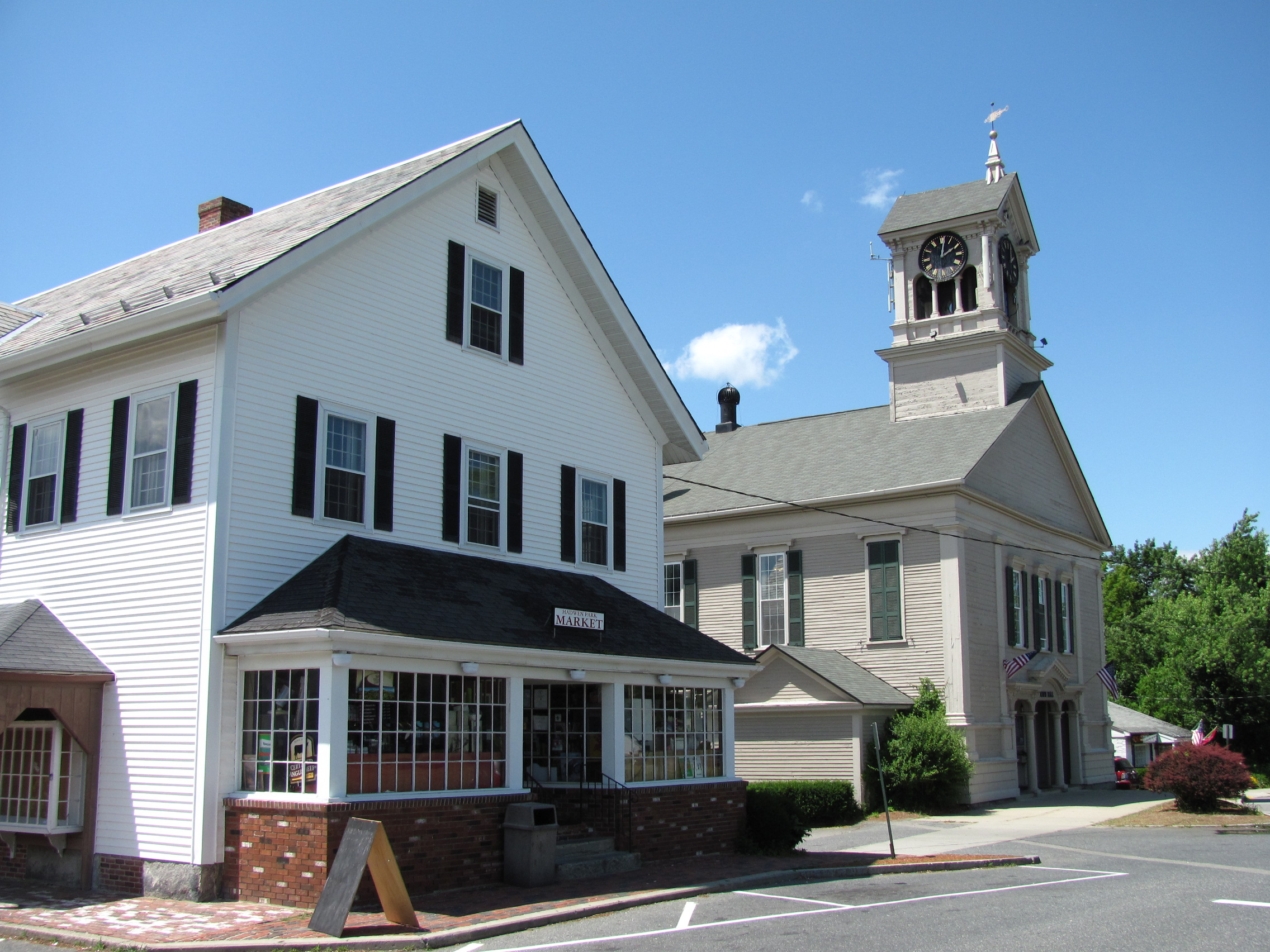
- Lunenburg Town Hall and Hadwen Park Market

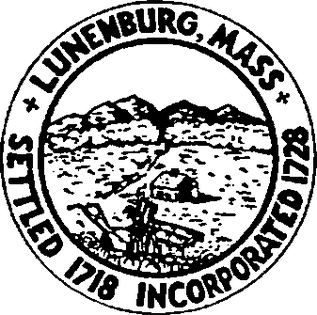
- Seal

- Location in Worcester County and the state of Massachusetts.
- Coordinates: 42°35′40″N 71°43′30″W
- Country: United States
- State: Massachusetts
- County: Worcester
- Settled: 1718
- Incorporated: 1728

Government
  - Type: Open town meeting and Board of Selectmen

Area
  - Total: 27.7 sq mi (71.7 km^{2})
  - Land: 26.4 sq mi (68.4 km^{2})
  - Water: 1.3 sq mi (3.3 km^{2})
- Elevation: 509 ft (155 m)

Population (2020)
  - Total: 11,782
  - Density: 446/sq mi (172/km^{2})
- Time zone: UTC-5 (Eastern)
  - Summer (DST): UTC-4 (Eastern)
- ZIP code: 01462
- Area code: 351 / 978
- FIPS code: 25-37420
- GNIS feature ID: 0618370
- Website: http://www.lunenburgma.gov/

Lunenburg is a town in Worcester County, Massachusetts, United States. The population was 11,782 at the 2020 census. It contains the census-designated place of the same name.

== History ==
Lunenburg was first settled by Europeans in 1718 and was officially incorporated in 1728. The name stems from one of the titles of King George II of Great Britain, Duke of Brunswick-Lüneburg. During King George's War (1744–1748), French-allied First Nations, such as warriors of the Mi'kmaq or Abenaki Confederacy, raided the village and took settlers captive to Quebec.

Areas of neighboring Fitchburg were once part of Lunenburg, but broke away around 1764. The settlers found the walking distance to church and town meetings too great and needed their own town center.

Whalom Park on Whalom Lake had long been a noted amusement park in Lunenburg during the 20th century. It was home of the famous Flyer Comet, now demolished. The park closed in 2000, unable to survive the competition with the newer and increasingly popular Six Flags New England in Agawam.

== Geography ==
According to the United States Census Bureau, the town has a total area of 27.7 square miles (72 km^{2}), of which 26.4 square miles (68 km^{2}) is land and 1.3 square miles (3.4 km^{2}), or 4.59%, is water.

Lunenburg is bordered by Townsend to the north, Shirley to the east, Lancaster to the southeast, Leominster to the south, Fitchburg to the west, and Ashby to the northwest. Three state highways pass through Lunenburg. Route 2A follows Mass Ave from the Shirley line to the Fitchburg line. Rt 13 follows Electric Ave from the Leominster line to Mass Ave. Rt 13 then follows Mass Ave/Rt 2a for 0.3 miles. Rt 13 then follows Chase Rd to the Townsend Line. Rt 225 begins in Lunenburg, at an intersection with Rt 2a/Mass Ave near the Shirley line. Rt 225 follows West Groton Rd from Rt 2a to the Shirley line.

== Demographics ==
Historical population
Year	Pop.	±%
1790	1,277	—
1900	1,332	+4.3%
1910	1,393	+4.6%
1920	1,634	+17.3%
1930	1,923	+17.7%
1940	2,195	+14.1%
1950	3,906	+77.9%
1960	6,334	+62.2%
1970	7,419	+17.1%
1980	8,405	+13.3%
1990	9,117	+8.5%
2000	9,401	+3.1%
2010	10,086	+7.3%
2020	11,782	+16.8%
2024*	12,007	+1.9%
* = population estimate. Source: United States census records and Population Estimates Program data.

As of the census of 2000, there were 9,401 people, 3,535 households, and 2,668 families residing in the town. The population density was 355.8 inhabitants per square mile (137.4/km^{2}). There were 3,668 housing units at an average density of 138.8 per square mile (53.6/km^{2}). The racial makeup of the town was 97.01% White, 0.69% Black or African American, 0.20% Native American, 0.78% Asian, 0.02% Pacific Islander, 0.26% from other races, and 1.04% from two or more races. Hispanic or Latino of any race were 1.15% of the population.

There were 3,535 households, out of which 34.9% had children under the age of 18 living with them, 63.6% were married couples living together, 8.7% had a female householder with no husband present, and 24.5% were non-families. 20.1% of all households were made up of individuals, and 8.3% had someone living alone who was 65 years of age or older. The average household size was 2.66 and the average family size was 3.08.

In the town, the population was spread out, with 25.8% under the age of 18, 5.6% from 18 to 24, 29.8% from 25 to 44, 26.8% from 45 to 64, and 12.0% who were 65 years of age or older. The median age was 39 years. For every 100 females, there were 98.1 males. For every 100 females age 18 and over, there were 95.3 males.

The median income for a household in the town was $56,813, and the median income for a family was $63,981. Males had a median income of $47,451 versus $31,934 for females. The per capita income for the town was $26,986. About 3.3% of families and 4.1% of the population were below the poverty line, including 3.7% of those under age 18 and 1.4% of those age 65 or over.

== Government ==
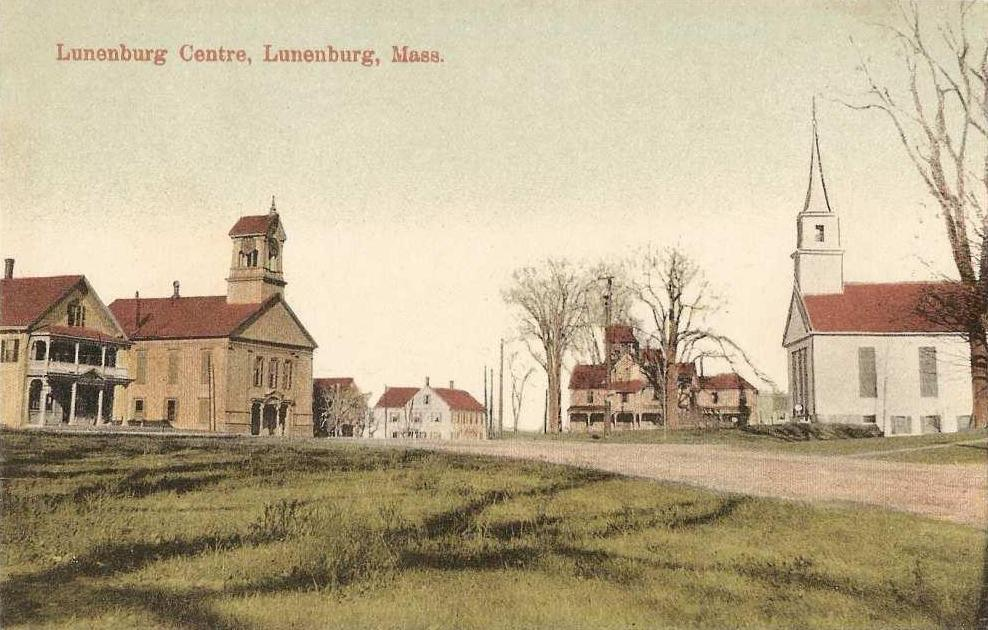
Town center c. 1910

County government: Worcester County
Clerk of Courts:	Dennis P. McManus (D)
District Attorney:	Joseph D. Early, Jr. (D)
Register of Deeds:	Kathleen R. Daigneault (D)
Register of Probate:	Stephen Abraham (D)
County Sheriff:	Lew Evangelidis (R)
State government
State Representative(s):	Danillo A. Sena (D)
State Senator(s):	John Cronin (D)
Governor's Councilor(s):	Paul Depaulo (D)
Federal government
President of the United States:	Donald Trump (R)
U.S. Representative(s):	Lori Trahan (D-3rd District),
U.S. Senators:	Elizabeth Warren (D), Ed Markey (D)

The Lunenburg public library began in 1853.

== Education ==
The public schools in town are the Lunenburg Primary School, Turkey Hill Elementary School, and Lunenburg Middle-High School. The high and middle schools are in the same building, beside the Turkey Hill building.

Private schools include Applewild School, an independent coeducational day school for pre-schoolers to eighth graders, established in 1957 in Fitchburg.

Montachusett Regional Vocational Technical School serves Lunenburg and Fitchburg.

== Transportation ==
The Montachusett Regional Transit Authority supplies Councils-On-Aging service for elderly and disabled residents. Portions of Lunenburg are also on its regular bus routes. The nearest rail stations are Shirley, Fitchburg and North Leominster on the MBTA Commuter Rail Fitchburg Line.

== Notable people ==
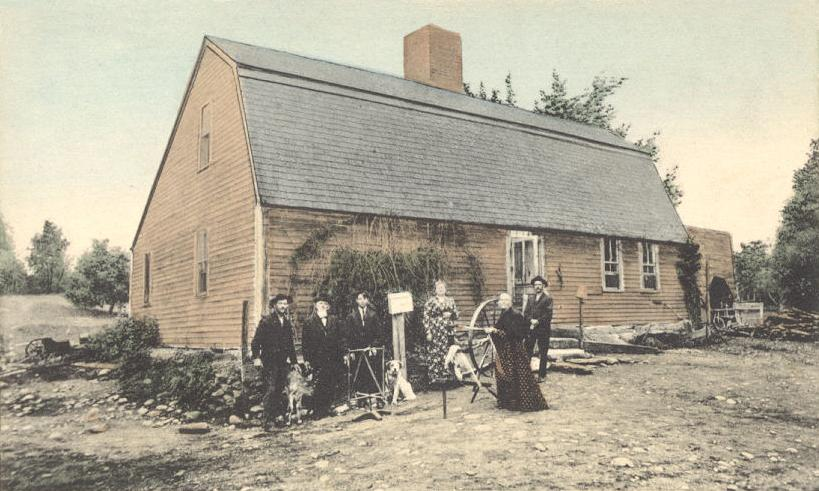
Old Sanderson House c. 1905

- Zabdiel Adams, minister
- William Austin, author
- George S. Boutwell, Governor of Massachusetts (1851–1853), U.S. Secretary of the Treasury (1869–1873)
- Asa Brigham, politician in the Texas Revolution
- Earle Brown, composer
- Luther Burbank, botanist and agricultural scientist
- Frederick Cushing Cross, Jr., naval officer
- Donovan Dijak, professional wrestler
- Gordon Edes, ESPN baseball writer
- Derek Kerswill, musician
- Dorothea Leighton, psychiatrist
- Josiah Litch, preacher
- David Pelletier, figure skater
- James Reed, soldier
- Abel Stearns, trader and cattle rancher
- Asahel Stearns, congressman
- Eleazer D. Wood, army officer
