= Wild mouse =

Type of roller coaster

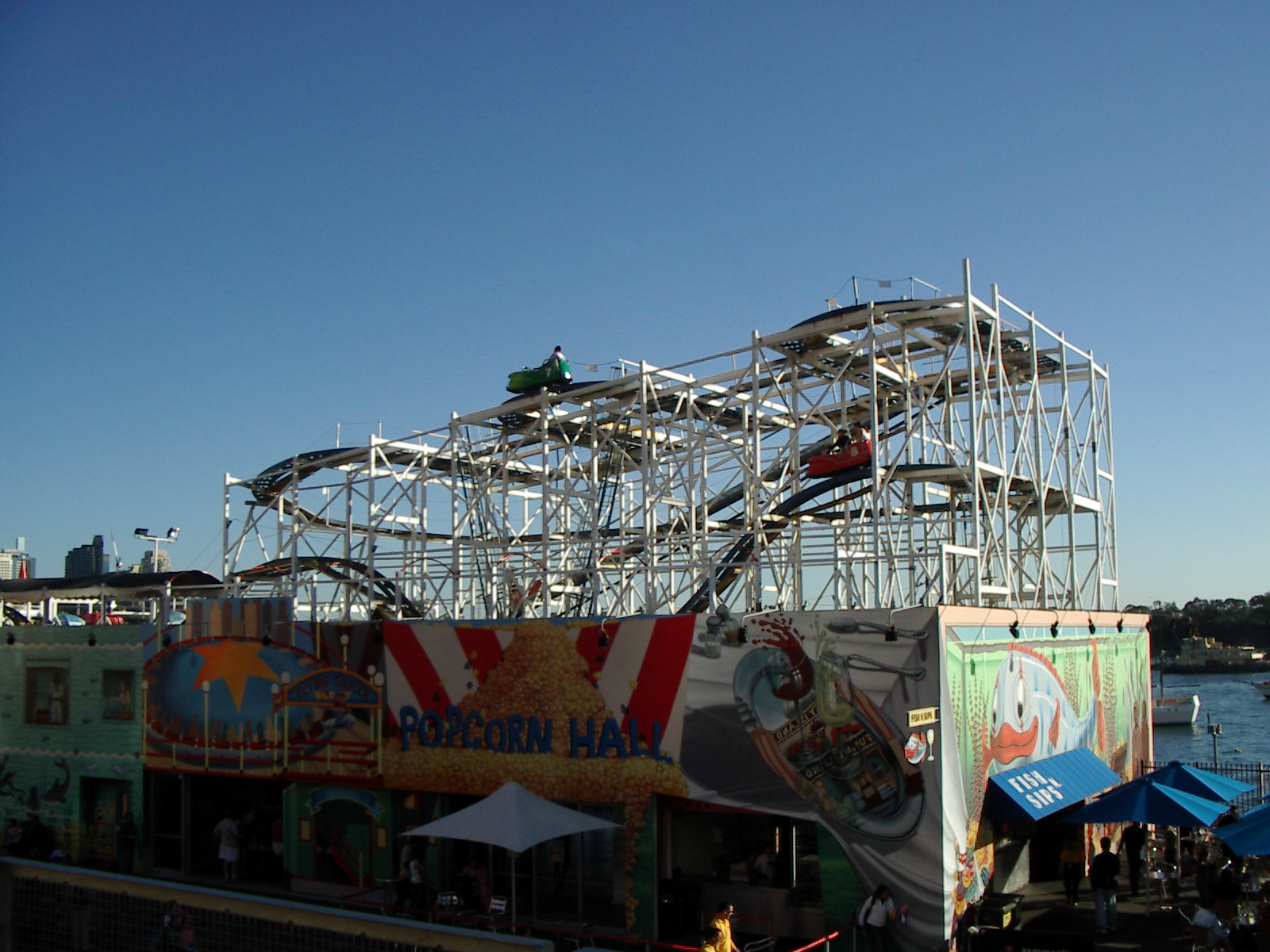
Wild Mouse at Luna Park Sydney

A wild mouse is a type of roller coaster consisting of single or spinning cars traversing a tight-winding track with an emphasis on sharp, unbanked turns. The upper portion of the track usually features multiple 180-degree turns, known as flat turns, that produce high lateral G-forces even at modest speeds. Cars are often designed to be wider than the track to enhance the illusion of hanging over the edge. Lower portions of the track typically feature small hills and bunny hops. Wild mouse coasters first appeared in the 1950s, and following a period of decline in the 1980s, new innovations and layout designs in the late 1990s led to a resurgence in demand.

== History ==
During the 1950s, wild mouse roller coasters began to appear at amusement parks and traveling fairs throughout the United States. One of the earliest manufacturers, B.A. Schiff & Associates, made over 70 beginning as early as 1950. The company was founded by Ben Schiff in what is believed to be 1947, and it ceased operation in 1960 following an acquisition. Schiff offered two general models – one for stationary parks and a smaller, portable model for traveling fairs. None of the rides produced by the company remain in operation.

The modern Wild Mouse was invented by German designer Franz Mack. In the original wooden Wild Mouse coasters of the 1960s and 1970s, the cars were so small that they could only fit two adults in close contact. While the low capacity of these rides led to long lines, the cars were small by design.

Throughout the 1970s and 1980s, the Wild Mouse-type roller coaster was nearly extinct. However, beginning in the mid-1990s, Wild Mouse-style rides made a comeback for two reasons: first, they were cheaper than larger, conventional coasters; second, they added to a park's "coaster count" with minimal impact on cost and area.

== Installations ==
| Name | Park | Type | Make | Opened | Closed/Status | Ref(s) |
|---|---|---|---|---|---|---|
| Apple Zapple | Kings Dominion | Steel | Mack Rides | 2002 | Operating | |
| Black Hole Wild Mouse | Fun 'n Wheels Lakewood Park | Steel | B.A. Schiff & Associates | 1983 1955 | 1985 1982 | |
| Barrels O' Fun Ragin' Cajun Ragin' Cajun | Six Flags Great Adventure Six Flags America Six Flags Great America | Spinning | Zamperla | 2026 2014 2004 | Closed 2013 | |
| Crazy Mouse | Fantasy Island | Spinning, Steel | Zamperla | 2005 | 2019 | |
| Coast Rider | Knott's Berry Farm | Steel | Mack Rides | 2013 | Operating | |
| Cyclone | Wonderland Park | Steel | Miler Manufacturing | 1968 | Operating | |
| The Dark Knight Coaster | Six Flags Great America | Steel | Mack Rides | 2008 | Operating | |
| The Dark Knight Coaster | Six Flags Great Adventure | Steel | Mack Rides | 2008 | Operating | |
| The Dark Knight Coaster | Six Flags Mexico | Steel | Mack Rides | 2009 | Operating | |
| Dizzy Mouse | Wiener Prater | Spinning | Reverchon | 1998 | Operating | |
| Doo Wopper | Morey's Pier | Steel | Zamperla | 1998 | Operating | |
| Eureka Mountain Mine Ride | Dreamworld | Steel | B.A. Schiff & Associates | 1986 | 2006 | |
| Exterminator | Kennywood | Spinning | Reverchon | 1999 | Operating | |
| The Fly | Canada's Wonderland | Steel | Mack Rides | 1999 | Operating | |
| Gold Digger | Mirabilandia | Steel | L&T Systems | 1998 | Operating | |
| Ghost Chasers Mad Manor Tom and Jerry's Mouse in the House | Movie Park Germany | Steel | Mack Rides | 2007 2005 2000 | Operating 2007 2005 | |
| Goofy's Sky School | Disney California Adventure | Steel | Mack Rides | 2001 | Operating | |
| Gotham City Gauntlet Escape from Arkham Asylum Road Runner Express | Six Flags New England Kentucky Kingdom | Steel | Maurer Rides | 2011 2000 | Operating 2009 | |
| Project X Jungle Coaster Great LEGO Race | Legoland Florida Legoland Windsor Resort | Steel | Mack Rides | 2018 2011 2004 | Operating 2018 2009 | |
| Project X Great LEGO Race | Legoland Malaysia Resort | Steel | Mack Rides | 2018 2012 | Operating 2017 | |
| Das Große LEGO Rennen | Legoland Deutschland Resort | Steel | Mack Rides | 2002 | Operating | |
| Insider Spinning Coaster Maihime | Wiener PraterTokyo Dome City | Spinning, Indoor | Maurer Rides | 2013 2000 | Operating 2011 | |
| Käpt’n Jacks Wilde Maus Holly's Wilde Autofahrt RatWild Mouse | Eifelpark Holiday Park Loudoun Castle Dreamland Margate | Steel | Maurer Rides | 2017 2010 2005 1998 | Operating 2016 2009 2004 | |
| Maskerade | Wiener Prater | Spinning | Gerstlauer | 2015 | Operating | |
| Matterhorn Blitz | Europa-Park | Steel | Mack Rides | 1999 | Operating | |
| Opa | Mt. Olympus Water & Theme Park | Spinning | Zamperla | 2006 | 2014 | |
| Psycho Mouse | California's Great America | Steel | Arrow Dynamics | 2001 | Operating | |
| Rattlesnake | Chessington World of Adventures | Steel | Maurer Rides | 1998 | Operating | |
| Ricochet | Carowinds | Steel | Mack Rides | 2002 | Operating | |
| Sand Serpent Wild Maus | Busch Gardens Tampa Busch Gardens Williamsburg | Steel | Mack Rides | 2004 1996 | 2023 2003 | |
| Souris Mécaniques | Jardin d'Acclimatation | Spinning | Reverchon | 2002 | Operating | |
| Speedy Bob | Bobbejaanland | Steel | Mack Rides | 1998 | Operating (right track) 2008 (left track) | |
| Tambang Mas Coaster Wild Mine Coaster | Suroboyo Carnival Night Market Sofia Land | Steel | L&T Systems | 2014 2002 | Operating 2006 | |
| Technic Coaster | Legoland California | Steel | Mack Rides | 2001 | Operating | |
| Tickler | Luna Park | Spinning | Zamperla | 2010 | Operating | |
| Tiger Express Flying Dutchman Gold Mine | Mer de Sable Walibi Holland | Steel | Mack Rides | 2011 2000 | Operating 2010 | |
| Toboggan Nordique | La Ronde | Steel | Zamperla | 2003 | Operating | |
| Torbellino | Parque de la Costa | Spinning | Beijing Jiuhua Amusement Rides Manufacturing Co. | 2010 | Operating | |
| Torbellino | Parque Diversiones | Spinning | Zamperla | 2018 | Operating | |
| Tornado | Parc Angl Michel | Spinning | Zamperla | 2013 | Operating | |
| Trans-Siberian Express | Terra Park | Spinning | SBF Visa Group | 2012 | 2016 | |
| Tree Top Racers | Adventure City | Steel | Miler Manufacturing | 1999 | 2012 | |
| Twister | Lightwater Valley | Spinning | Reverchon | 2001 | Removed | |
| Twister Coaster | Aktur Park | Spinning | Zamperla | 2008 | Operating | |
| Twister Coaster | Basrah Land | Spinning | Zamperla | 2005 | Operating | |
| Twister Coaster | Bostanci Luna Park | Spinning | Zamperla | 2008 | Operating | |
| Twister Coaster | Chimelong Paradise | Spinning | Golden Horse | 2006 | 2011 | |
| Twister Coaster | Gorky Park | Spinning | Zamperla | 2005 | 2011 | |
| Twister Coaster | Park Lunasan | Spinning | Zamperla | 2009 | Operating | |
| Twister Coaster | Tsentralnyy Park | Spinning | Zamperla | 2011 | Operating | |
| Twister Mountain | Leolandia | Spinning | Zamperla | 2008 | Operating | |
| Twister Mountain | Hili Fun City | Spinning | Zamperla | 2009 | Operating | |
| Twister Rollercoaster | Crealy Adventure Park | Spinning | SBF Visa Group | 2015 | Operating | |
| Twist 'n' Shout Twist 'n' Shout Wild Wonder | Family Kingdom Amusement Park Magic Springs Theme and Water Park Gillian's Wonderland Pier | Steel | Zamperla | 2013 2000 1999 | Operating 2012 1999 | |
| Tyfonen | Tivoli Friheden | Spinning | Zamperla | 2006 | Operating | |
| Vértigo Speedy Bob | Parque de Atracciones de Madrid Bobbejaanland | Steel | Mack Rides | 2009 1998 | Operating 2008 | |
| Viking Roller Coaster | Energylandia | Spinning | SBF Visa Group | 2014 | Operating | |
| Vilde Mus | Bakken | Steel | Mack Rides | 2012 | Operating | |
| Wall's Twister Ride | West Midland Safari Park | Spinning | Reverchon | 1998 | Operating | |
| Whirling Dinosaurs | China Dinosaurs Park | Spinning | Golden Horse | 2009 | 2018 | |
| Wildcat | Rocky Point Amusement Park | Steel | - | 1958 | 1974 | |
| Wild Beetle Race | Pirates World | Steel | B.A. Schiff & Associates | 1967 | 1973 | |
| Wild Chipmunk | Lakeside Amusement Park | Steel | Miler Manufacturing | 1955 | Operating | |
| Wild Elfin | Happy Valley Shenzhen | Spinning | Golden Horse | 2008 | 2015 | |
| Wild Lightnin' | Lake Winnepesaukah | Steel | L&T Systems | 2001 | Operating | |
| Wilde Maus Wilde Maus | Antibes Land Europark | Steel | Maurer Rides | 2011 2007 | 2013 2011 | |
| Wild Maus Wild Maus | Detskiy Park Attrapark | Steel | Maurer Rides | 2018 2007 | Operating 2016 | |
| Wilde Maus | Freizeit-Land Geiselwind | Steel | Mack Rides | 2012 | 2013 | |
| Wilde Maus Wilde Maus Wilde Maus Zig Zag | Freizeit-Land Geiselwind Sommerland Syd Toverland Walygator Parc | Steel | Mack Rides | 2011 2010 2004 2003 | 2011 2010 2004 2003 | |
| Wilde Maus | Holiday Park | Wooden | - | 1971 | 1978 | |
| Wilde Maus Wilde Maus | Loudoun Castle Spreepark | Wooden | - | 2000 1995 | 2001 1997 | |
| Wilde Maus | Springlake Park | Wooden | - | 1961 | 1979 | |
| Wilde Maus | Taunus Wunderland | Steel | Mack Rides | 1999 | Operating | |
| Wilde Maus | Wiener Prater | Steel | Maurer Rides | 1997 | Operating | |
| Wilde Maus | Wiener Prater | Steel | Maurer Rides | 1996 | 1997 | |
| Wild Maus | Pontchartrain Beach | Wooden | - | 1959 | - | |
| Wild Maus | Queens Park | Wooden | - | 1961 | 1979 | |
| Wild Mine | Cavallino Matto | Steel | L&T Systems | 1997 | Operating | |
| Wild Mine Ride | Gulliver's Warrington | Steel | L&T Systems | 1999 | 2015 | |
| Wild Mouse | Amtree Park | Steel | - | 1969 | 1975 | |
| Wild Mouse Wild Mouse | Antibes Land Expoland | Steel | Mack Rides | 2014 1996 | Operating 2007 | |
| Wild Mouse Mad Mouse Mad Mouse | Arnolds Park Joyland Amusement Park Bell's Amusement Park | Steel | Allan Herschell Company | 2019 1976 1959 | Operating 2018 1975 | |
| Wild Mouse | Arnolds Park | Steel | B.A. Schiff & Associates | 1958 | 1973 | |
| Wild Mouse | Atlas Park | Steel | - | 1970 | 1975 | |
| Wild Mouse | Aussie World | Wooden | - | 2000 | 2016 | |
| Wild Mouse | Barry Island Pleasure Park | Spinning | Reverchon | 2019 | 2019 | |
| Wild Mouse | Beech Bend | Spinning | Zamperla | 2005 | Operating | |
| Wild Mouse | Bertrand Island | Steel | Allan Herschell Company | 1983 | 1983 | |
| Wild Mouse | Blackpool Pleasure Beach | Wooden | Blackpool Pleasure Beach | 1958 | 2017 | |
| Wild Mouse Wild Mouse | Brean Theme Park Harbour Park | Steel | Butlin | 1988 1962 | 1997 1986 | |
| Wild Mouse | Buckeye Lake | Steel | B.A. Schiff & Associates | 1959 | 1971 | |
| Wild Mouse | Bushkill Park Dorney Park | Steel | B.A. Schiff & Associates | 1966 1958 | 1980 1965 | |
| Wild Mouse | Butlins | Steel | Butlin | 1962 | 1975 | |
| Wild Mouse | Canadian National Exhibition | Wooden | - | 1960 | 1968 | |
| Wild Mouse | Canobie Lake Park | Steel | B.A. Schiff & Associates | 1962 | 1962 | |
| Wild Mouse | Casino Pier | Wooden | - | 1966 | 1966 | |
| Wild Mouse | Casino Pier Beech Bend | Steel | B.A. Schiff & Associates | 1965 1958 | 1965 - | |
| Wild Mouse | Casino Pier | Steel | B.A. Schiff & Associates | 1958 | 1965 | |
| Wild Mouse | Cedar Point | Steel | B.A. Schiff & Associates | 1959 | 1963 | |
| Wild Mouse | Chipperfield Bros Amusement Park | Steel | Maxwell & Sons | 1969 | 1984 | |
| Wild Mouse | Chippewa Lake Park | Steel | B.A. Schiff & Associates | 1972 | 1978 | |
| Wild Mouse | Codona's Amusement Park | Wooden | Maxwell & Sons | 1977 | 1977 | |
| Wild Mouse | Coney Island | Steel | B.A. Schiff & Associates | 1958 | 1969 | |
| Wild Mouse | Conneaut Lake Park | Wooden | B.A. Schiff & Associates | 1961 | 1990 | |
| Wild Mouse | Crystal Beach Park | Wooden | - | 1959 | 1981 | |
| Wild Mouse | DandiLion Park | Steel | B.A. Schiff & Associates | 1950 | 1977 | |
| Wild Mouse | Dells Springs Park | Steel | B.A. Schiff & Associates | 1956 | 1960 | |
| Wild Mouse | Dodge Park Playland | Steel | - | 1965 | 1970 | |
| Wild Mouse | Doling Park | Steel | B.A. Schiff & Associates | 1969 | 1976 | |
| Wild Mouse | Dorney Park | Steel | Maurer Rides | 2000 | Operating | |
| Wild Mouse | Eagle Park | Steel | B.A. Schiff & Associates | - | SBNO | |
| Wild Mouse | Edgewater Park | Steel | B.A. Schiff & Associates | 1959 | 1981 | |
| Wild Mouse | Elitch Gardens | Steel | B.A. Schiff & Associates | 1960 | 1977 | |
| Wild Mouse | Eram Park | Spinning | Vafaei Rides | 2013 | Operating | |
| Wild Mouse | Fantasilandia | Spinning | Zamperla | 2006 | Operating | |
| Wild Mouse Wild Mouse | Folly Beach Pier Gay Dolphin Park | Steel | B.A. Schiff & Associates | - 1960 | 1977 1966 | |
| Wild Mouse Wild Mouse | Fun & Games Park Sans Souci Park | Steel | B.A. Schiff & Associates | 1971 1958 | - 1970 | |
| Wild Mouse | Fun City | Steel | B.A. Schiff & Associates | 1958 | 1960 | |
| Wild Mouse | Fun Fair Kiddy Park | Steel | B.A. Schiff & Associates | 1951 | 1968 | |
| Wild Mouse | Fun Fair Park | Steel | B.A. Schiff & Associates | 1977 | 1980 | |
| Wild Mouse | Fun Forest Amusement Park | Wooden | - | 1966 | 1973 | |
| Wild Mouse | Fun Junction | Steel | B.A. Schiff & Associates | - | 2001 | |
| Wild Mouse Wild Mouse | Funland Amusement Park Clarence Pier | Steel | Maxwell & Sons | 1980 1960 | 1988 1979 | |
| Wild Mouse | Funland Park | Steel | B.A. Schiff & Associates | 1956 | 1963 | |
| Wild Mouse | Funtown Pier | Steel | B.A. Schiff & Associates | 1957 | 1960 | |
| Wild Mouse Wild Mouse | Funtown Splashtown USA Jolly Roger Amusement Park | Steel | Maurer Rides | 2009 2002 | Operating 2006 | |
| Wild Mouse | Gayway | Steel | - | 1960 | 1980 | |
| Wild Mouse | Gwynn Oak Park | Steel | B.A. Schiff & Associates | 1957 | 1972 | |
| Wild Mouse | Hafan y Môr Holiday Park | Steel | Butlin | 1964 | 1975 | |
| Wild Mouse | Hersheypark | Steel | Mack Rides | 1999 | Operating | |
| Wild Mouse Wild Mouse | Hillbilly Town Park Lake of the Ozarks Amusement Park | Steel | B.A. Schiff & Associates | - 1968 | 1992 1970 | |
| Wild Mouse | Hocus Pocus Park | Steel | B.A. Schiff & Associates | 1966 | - | |
| Wild Mouse Alton Mouse Speeedy Gonzales | Idlewild & SoakZone Alton Towers Wiener Prater | Steel | Vekoma | 1993 1988 1985 | Operating 1991 1987 | |
| Wild Mouse | Indian Lake Playland | Steel | B.A. Schiff & Associates | 1960 | 1975 | |
| Wild Mouse | Jalisco Park | Steel | B.A. Schiff & Associates | 1956 | - | |
| Wild Mouse | Joyland | Steel | B.A. Schiff & Associates | 1959 | 1964 | |
| Wild Mouse | Kariya-shi Kotsu Jido Yuen | Steel | Senyo Kogyo Co., Ltd. | 1991 | 2007 | |
| Wild Mouse | Kaydeross Park | Steel | B.A. Schiff & Associates | 1967 | 1973 | |
| Wild Mouse | Kennywood | Steel | B.A. Schiff & Associates | 1958 | 1960 | |
| Wild Mouse | Kiddie Land | Steel | B.A. Schiff & Associates | 1958 | - | |
| Wild Mouse | Komsomol Anniversary Park | Steel | - | 2006 | Operating | |
| Wild Mouse | Kursaal Amusement Park | Steel | Maxwell & Sons | 1960 | 1969 | |
| Wild Mouse | Lagoon | Steel | Maurer Rides | 1998 | Operating | |
| New Wilder Wild Mouse Wild Mouse Wild Mouse | Lagoon Lagoon Fun Forest Amusement Park | Wooden | Mack Rides | 1973 1965 1962 | 1989 1971 1964 | |
| Wild Mouse | Lakeview Park | Steel | B.A. Schiff & Associates | 1965 | 1987 | |
| Wild Mouse Wild Mouse | Land of Fun Suburban Park | Steel | B.A. Schiff & Associates | 1960 1959 | - 1959 | |
| Wild Mouse | Landa Park | Steel | B.A. Schiff & Associates | 1973 | 1995 | |
| Wild Mouse | Leisureland | Spinning | Zamperla | 2007 | 2013 | |
| Wild Mouse | LeSourdsville Lake Amusement Park | Steel | - | 1961 | 1964 | |
| Wild Mouse | Luna Park Sydney Sydney Showground (Note: Occasionally made appearances for special events) | Wooden | Hopkins & Pearce | 1963 (Note: Was removed from Luna Park in 1969, when it became part of the travelling fair circuit. Returned as a permanent attraction in 1995.) | Operating | |
| Wild Mouse | Luna Park Mamaia | Spinning | Zamperla | 2008 | Operating | |
| Wild Mouse | Magic Land | Spinning | Zamperla | 2017 | Operating | |
| Wild Mouse | Magic Land | Steel | Mack Rides | 1996 | SBNO | |
| Wild Mouse | Morey's Piers | Steel | B.A. Schiff & Associates | 1957 | 1968 | |
| Wild Mouse | Morey's Piers | Steel | B.A. Schiff & Associates | 1957 | 1961 | |
| Wild Mouse | Nagashima Spa Land | Steel | Mack Rides | 1996 | Operating | |
| Wild Mouse | Ocean View Pavilion | Steel | B.A. Schiff & Associates | 1949 | 1961 | |
| Wild Mouse | Olympic Park Roseland Park | Steel | B.A. Schiff & Associates | 1960 1956 | 1982 1959 | |
| Wild Mouse | Olympic Park | Steel | B.A. Schiff & Associates | 1963 | 1965 | |
| Wild Mouse Wild Mouse | Orange County Fairgrounds Fantasy Forest at the Flushing Meadows Carousel | Steel | B.A. Schiff & Associates | 1965 1965 | 1969 1965 | |
| Wild Mouse | Palisades Amusement Park | Wooden | - | 1957 | 1971 | |
| Wild Mouse | Paragon Park | Steel | B.A. Schiff & Associates | 1957 | 1960 | |
| Wild Mouse | Parc Belmont | Wooden | - | 1958 | - | |
| Wild Mouse | Park Attraktsionov | Spinning | Zamperla | 2011 | Operating | |
| Wild Mouse | Parko Paliatso Luna Park | Spinning | Sartori Rides | 2004 | Operating | |
| Wild Mouse | Playland | Wood | - | 1969 | - | |
| Wild Mouse | Playland at the PNE | Steel | Princeton Machine | 1979 | 2008 | |
| Wild Mouse | Playland Park | Steel | - | - | 1985 | |
| Wild Mouse | Playland Park | Steel | B.A. Schiff & Associates | 1962 | 1973 | |
| Wild Mouse | Playland Park | Wooden | - | 1958 | 1966 | |
| Wild Mouse | Playtown Park | Steel | B.A. Schiff & Associates | 1959 | 1960 | |
| Wild Mouse | Plopsa Coo | Spinning | Reverchon | 2006 | 2006 | |
| Wild Mouse | Quassy Amusement Park | Steel | B.A. Schiff & Associates | 1960 | 1983 | |
| Wild Mouse | Revere Beach | Steel | B.A. Schiff & Associates | 1958 | 1966 | |
| Wild Mouse | Riverside Park | Steel | B.A. Schiff & Associates | 1958 | 1969 | |
| Wild Mouse | Riverview Park | Steel | B.A. Schiff & Associates | 1959 | 1978 | |
| Wild Mouse | Riverview Park | Steel | B.A. Schiff & Associates | 1958 | 1967 | |
| Wild Mouse | Rocky Springs Park | Steel | - | 1979 | 1980 | |
| Wild Mouse | Sammy's Dreamland | Steel | - | 2000 | 2005 | |
| Wild Mouse | Santa Cruz Beach Boardwalk | Wooden | Santa Cruz Beach Boardwalk | 1958 | 1976 | |
| Wild Mouse | Saratoga Resort | Steel | B.A. Schiff & Associates | 1963 | 1979 | |
| Wild Mouse | Saratoga Resort | Steel | B.A. Schiff & Associates | 1959 | 1959 | |
| Wild Mouse | Showbiz City | Steel | - | 2002 | 2007 | |
| Wild Mouse | Six Flags New England | Steel | B.A. Schiff & Associates | 1957 | - | |
| Wild Mouse | Six Gun Territory | Steel | B.A. Schiff & Associates | 1958 | 1975 | |
| Wild Mouse | State Fair of Texas | Wooden | - | 1958 | 1979 | |
| Wild Mouse | Suburban Park | Wooden | - | 1971 | 1973 | |
| Wild Mouse | Sunrise Park | Steel | B.A. Schiff & Associates | 1950 | - | |
| Wild Mouse | Tower View Park | Wooden | - | 1965 | 1968 | |
| Wild Mouse | Trimper's Rides | Steel | B.A. Schiff & Associates | 1963 | 1985 | |
| Wild Mouse | Wedgewood Village | Steel | B.A. Schiff & Associates | 1958 | 1960 | |
| Wild Mouse | West Point Park | Steel | B.A. Schiff & Associates | 1958 | 1976 | |
| Wild Mouse | West View Park | Wooden | - | 1955 | 1963 | |
| Wild Mouse | Western Fair | Wooden | - | 1959 | - | |
| Wild Mouse | Willow Park | Steel | B.A. Schiff & Associates | - | 2000 | |
| Wild Mouse | York's Wild Kingdom | Steel | B.A. Schiff & Associates | 1960 | 1961 | |
| Wild Storm | O-World | Spinning | Maurer Rides | 2003 | Operating | |
| Woodstock Express | Walibi Rhône-Alpes | Steel | Zamperla | 2002 | Operating | |
| X-Treme Racers | Legoland Billund Resort | Steel | Mack Rides | 2002 | Operating | |
| unknown | Adventureland Amusement Park | Steel | B.A. Schiff & Associates | 1986 | 1988 | |
| unknown | Al Hokair Land Theme Park | Steel | Maurer Rides | 2006 | Operating | |
| unknown | Al-Jazeera Recreational Park | Spinning | - | 2018 | Operating | |
| unknown | Anyang China Dream Valley | Spinning | Beijing Jiuhua Amusement Rides Manufacturing Co. | 2016 | Operating | |
| unknown | Around the World in Eighty Days | Spinning | Golden Horse | 2007 | 2016 | |
| unknown | Atallah Happy Land Park | Steel | - | 2001 | 2008 | |
| unknown | Attractiepark Slagharen | Wooden | - | 1974 | 1975 | |
| unknown | Cang Masan Park | Spinning | Golden Horse | 2009 | 2014 | |
| unknown | Century Garden Playground | Spinning | Golden Horse | 2018 | SBNO | |
| unknown | Chavi Land | Spinning | Beijing Jiuhua Amusement Rides Manufacturing Co. | 2013 | Operating | |
| unknown | Children's Park | Spinning | - | 2014 | Operating | |
| unknown | Coney Island | Wooden | - | 1962 | 1980 | |
| unknown | Danjiangkou Canglanghai Tourist Harbour | Spinning | Golden Horse | 2015 | Operating | |
| unknown | Delta Sidoarjo Fantasy | Spinning | - | 2019 | Operating | |
| unknown | Dinosaur Joy Kingdom | Spinning | Golden Horse | 2017 | Operating | |
| unknown | Dollywood | Steel | - | 1970 | 1979 | |
| unknown | Dragon Lake Beach Happy World | Spinning | Golden Horse | 2014 | Operating | |
| unknown | Dream Island | Spinning | Fabbri | 2019 | Operating | |
| unknown | Famili Parc | Spinning | Zamperla | 2013 | Operating | |
| unknown | Fantasia | Steel | - | 2003 | 2012 | |
| unknown Wild Mouse | Frontier Land Rainbow Gardens | Steel | B.A. Schiff & Associates | 1968 - | 1982 1968 | |
| unknown | Fun World | Spinning | - | 2008 | Operating | |
| unknown | Fuyang Park | Spinning | Golden Horse | 2006 | Operating | |
| unknown | Gandongbei Paradise | Spinning | - | 2002 | Operating | |
| unknown | Ganquan Park | Spinning | Golden Horse | 2009 | Operating | |
| unknown | Haddad Tourism Village | Steel | - | 2016 | Operating | |
| unknown | Haibei Eryou Lecheng | Spinning | Golden Horse | 2003 | 2015 | |
| unknown | Happy Park Zakho | Spinning | SBF Visa Group | 2012 | Operating | |
| unknown | Hebei Sanlian Youdiao Paradise | Spinning | Golden Horse | 2008 | 2017 | |
| unknown | Hillpark Sibolangit | Steel | Top Fun | 2013 | Operating | |
| unknown | Hot Springs Holiday Park | Steel | - | 1960 | - | |
| unknown | Huaxiacheng | Spinning | Beijing Jiuhua Amusement Rides Manufacturing Co. | 2009 | Operating | |
| unknown | Jiangxin Xiyuan | Steel | - | 2004 | - | |
| unknown | Jinping Park | Spinning | Golden Horse | 2010 | Operating | |
| unknown | Kuwait Magic | Spinning | Golden Horse | 2016 | Operating | |
| unknown | Lily International Expo | Steel | - | 2015 | Operating | |
| unknown | Mexin Village of Wine | Spinning | Golden Horse | 2005 | Operating | |
| unknown | Nandaihe International Amusement Center | Steel | - | 2012 | Operating | |
| unknown | North Chuan Park | Steel | - | 2014 | Operating | |
| unknown | Oriental Land | Steel | - | 2010 | Operating | |
| unknown | Panda Paradise | Spinning | Beijing Jiuhua Amusement Rides Manufacturing Co. | 2011 | Operating | |
| unknown | People's Park | Spinning | Golden Horse | 2009 | Operating | |
| unknown | People's Park | Spinning | Beijing Jiuhua Amusement Rides Manufacturing Co. | 2010 | Operating | |
| unknown | Quanzhou Amusement Park | Steel | - | 2013 | Operating | |
| unknown | Ramsar Park | Spinning | Golden Horse | 2004 | Operating | |
| unknown | Seaside Park | Steel | - | 2004 | SBNO | |
| unknown | Shishan Park | Steel | - | 2010 | 2018 | |
| unknown | Spiritsland | Spinning | Golden Horse | 2014 | Operating | |
| unknown | Taihu Lake Longemont Paradise | Spinning | Beijing Jiuhua Amusement Rides Manufacturing Co. | 2020 | Under Construction | |
| unknown | Taoqimao | Spinning | Golden Horse | 2006 | Operating | |
| unknown unknown | Tianchi Park Cuiping Mountain Park | Spinning | Golden Horse | 2013 2004 | Operating 2013 | |
| unknown | Victory Park | Steel | - | 2011 | Operating | |
| unknown | Victory Park | Steel | - | 2013 | Operating | |
| unknown | Wan Sui Mountain Scenic Zone | Spinning | - | 2015 | Operating | |
| unknown | Wangcheng Park | Spinning | Golden Horse | 2008 | Operating | |
| unknown | Wangcheng Park | Steel | - | 2007 | Operating | |
| unknown | Wild Waters Water Park | Steel | - | 1978 | 1989 | |
| unknown | Xila Mulun Park | Spinning | - | 2014 | Operating | |
| unknown | Xinghai Park | Spinning | Golden Horse | 2007 | 2009 | |
| unknown | Xining People's Park | Steel | - | 2007 | 2015 | |
| unknown | Xisen Huanledao | Steel | - | 2008 | Operating | |
| unknown | Xishan Park | Spinning | Golden Horse | 2010 | Operating | |
| unknown | Yellow River Park | Steel | - | 2014 | Operating | |
| unknown | Yilihe Amusement Park | Spinning | - | 2016 | Operating | |
| unknown | Yuanxiang International Vanilla Garden | Spinning | - | 2015 | Operating | |
| unknown | Yuelianghu Park | Spinning | Golden Horse | 2010 | Operating | |
| unknown | Yuncheng Waldorf Forest Park | Steel | - | 2008 | Operating | |
| unknown | Yuxi Park | Spinning | Beijing Jiuhua Amusement Rides Manufacturing Co. | 2007 | 2013 | |
| unknown | Zhejiang Minsu Paradise | Spinning | Golden Horse | 2010 | 2019 | |
| unknown | Zipengshan National Forest Park | Spinning | - | 2015 | Operating | |
| unknown | Zixuhu Happy Carnival | Steel | - | 2017 | Operating | |
| unknown | Zunyi Park | Steel | - | 2006 | 2014 | |
| X-treme Racers | Legoland Billund | Steel | Mack Rides | 2002 | Operating | |
| Mad Mouse | Valleyfair | Steel | Arrow Dynamics | 1999 | Operating | |
| Bukkerittet The Buck Ride | Kongeparken | Steel | Reverchon | 2008 | Operating | |
| Mad Mouse | Michigan's Adventure | Steel | Arrow Dynamics | 1999 | Operating | |
| Wild Mouse | Cedar Point | Steel | Zamperla | 2023 | Operating | |
