= Wild mouse (disambiguation) =

A wild mouse is a type of roller coaster.

Wild mouse may also refer to:

- Wild Mouse (film), a 2017 Austrian comedy film
- Wild Mouse (Beech Bend Park), a roller coaster at Beech Bend Park in Kentucky
- Wild Mouse (Blackpool Pleasure Beach), a roller coaster at Blackpool Pleasure Beach in North West England
- Wild Mouse (Hersheypark), a roller coaster at Hersheypark in Pennsylvania
- Wild Mouse (Idlewild), a roller coaster at Idlewild and Soak Zone in Pennsylvania
- Wild Mouse (Lagoon), a roller coaster at Lagoon in Utah
- Wild Mouse (Luna Park Sydney), a roller coaster at Luna Park Sydney in New South Wales.
