= B.A. Schiff & Associates =

American amusement ride manufacturer

- Company type: Private
- Industry: Roller coaster manufacturing
- Founded: 1950
- Founder: Ben Schiff
- Headquarters: Miami, Florida, USA
- Area served: North America

B.A. Schiff & Associates was a roller coaster manufacturing firm based in Miami, Florida, United States. Founded by its namesake, Ben Schiff, the company produced family style roller coasters including a variety of kiddie roller coasters and Wild Mouse roller coasters. The company operated from approximately 1948 into the early 1970s.

== List of roller coasters ==
As of 2023, B.A. Schiff & Associates has built 96 roller coasters around the world.

Name	Model	Park	Country	Opened	Status	Ref
Tumbleweed; Formerly Lil Devil	Kiddie Coaster / Park Model	Ghost Town Village	United States	Unknown	Closed	
Wild Mouse	Wild Mouse / Small	Fun Junction	United States	Unknown	Removed	
Wild Mouse	Wild Mouse / Large	York's Wild Kingdom	United States	Unknown	Removed	
Rainbow Chaser	Kiddie Coaster / Park Model	Fun Forest Amusement Park	United States	Unknown	Removed	
Unknown	Kiddie Coaster / Park Model	Recreation Park	United States	Unknown	Removed	
Wild Mouse	Wild Mouse / Small	Willow Park	United States	Unknown	Removed	
Wild Mouse	Wild Mouse / Size Unknown	Como Town	United States	Unknown	Removed	
Unknown	Unknown	Olympic Park	United States	Unknown	Removed	
Bob-baan	Unknown	Amusementspark Tivoli	Netherlands	Unknown	Removed	
Little Ripper	Unknown	Thrill-Ville USA	United States	Unknown	Removed	
Wild Mouse	Wild Mouse / Large	Lakewood Park	United States	Unknown	Removed	
Wild Mouse	Wild Mouse / Large	Folly Beach Pier; Gay Dolphin Park	(United States)	Unknown; 1960 to 1966	Removed	
Wild Mouse	Wild Mouse / Large	Hillbilly Town Park; Lake of the Ozarks Amusement Park	United States	Unknown; 1968 to 1970	Removed	
Wild Mouse	Wild Mouse / Large	Ocean View Pavillon	United States	1949	Removed	
Wild Mouse	Wild Mouse / Large	DandiLion Park	United States	1950	Removed	
Wild Mouse	Wild Mouse / Large	Sunrise Park	United States	1950	Removed	
Wild Mouse	Wild Mouse / Small	Fun Fair Kiddy Park	United States	1951	Removed	
Kiddie Coaster	Unknown	Dorney Park	United States	1952	Removed	
Unknown	Unknown	Smiley's Happyland	United States	1952	Removed	
Kiddie Roller Coaster	Unknown	Dodge Park Playland	United States	1952	Removed	
Unknown	Unknown	Edgewater Park	United States	1952	Removed	
Roller Coaster	Unknown	Nunley's	United States	1954	Removed	
Roller Coaster	Unknown	Rotary Storyland and Playland	United States	1955	Removed	
Wild Mouse	Wild Mouse / Large	Funland Park	United States	1956	Removed	
Wild Mouse	Wild Mouse / Size Unknown	Jalisco Park	Cuba	1956	Removed	
Wild Mouse	Wild Mouse / Large	Dells Springs Park	United States	1956	Removed	
Wild Mouse	Wild Mouse / Large	Roseland Park	United States	1956	Removed	
Unknown; Formerly Baby Wild Cat	Unknown	Massapequa Zoo & Kiddie Park; Woodside Park	United States	1956; 1950 to 1955	Removed	
Wild Mouse	Wild Mouse / Large	Gwynn Oak Park	United States	1957	Removed	
Wild Mouse	Wild Mouse / Large	Morey's Piers	United States	1957	Removed	
Wild Mouse	Wild Mouse / Large	Morey's Piers	United States	1957	Removed	
Wild Mouse	Wild Mouse / Size Unknown	Six Flags New England	United States	1957	Removed	
Wild Mouse	Wild Mouse / Large	Paragon Park	United States	1957	Removed	
Wild Mouse	Wild Mouse / Large	Funtown Pier	United States	1957	Removed	
Wild Mouse	Wild Mouse / Large	Kennywood	United States	1958	Removed	
Wild Mouse	Wild Mouse / Large	Casino Pier	United States	1958	Removed	
Wild Mouse	Wild Mouse / Large	Arnolds Park	United States	1958	Removed	
Wild Mouse	Wild Mouse / Large	West Point Park	United States	1958	Removed	
Wild Mouse	Wild Mouse / Large	Kiddie Land	United States	1958	Removed	
Wild Mouse	Wild Mouse / Large	Coney Island	United States	1958 to 1969	Removed	
Wild Mouse	Wild Mouse / Large	Six Gun Territory	United States	1958 to 1975	Removed	
Wild Mouse	Wild Mouse / Large	Riverview Park	United States	1958 to 1967	Removed	
Wild Mouse	Wild Mouse / Large	Revere Beach	United States	1958	Removed	
Wild Mouse	Wild Mouse / Large	Wedgewood Village	United States	1958	Removed	
Wild Mouse	Wild Mouse / Large	Fun City	United States	1958	Removed	
Wild Mouse	Wild Mouse / Large	Cedar Point	United States	1959	Removed	
Wild Mouse	Wild Mouse / Large	Edgewater Park	United States	1959 to 1981	Removed	
Wild Mouse	Wild Mouse / Small	Playtown Park	United States	1959	Removed	
Wild Mouse	Wild Mouse / Small	Saratoga Resort	United States	1959	Removed	
Wild Mouse	Wild Mouse / Large	Riverview Park	United States	1959 to 1978	Removed	
Wild Mouse	Wild Mouse / Large	Buckeye Lake	United States	1959 to 1971	Removed	
Wild Mouse	Wild Mouse / Large	Joyland	United States	1959	Removed	
Roller Coaster	Unknown	Kiddieland	United States	1960	Operating	
Wild Mouse	Wild Mouse / Large	Elitch Gardens	United States	1960	Removed	
Wild Mouse	Wild Mouse / Large	Quassy Amusement Park	United States	1960	Removed	
Wild Mouse	Wild Mouse / Large	Olympic Park	United States	1960	Removed	
Wild Mouse	Wild Mouse / Large	Land of Fun; Suburban Park	United States	1960; 1959	Removed	
Wild Mouse	Wild Mouse / Large	Indian Lake Playland	United States	1960	Removed	
Brat	Unknown	Erieview Park	United States	1961	Removed	
Wild Mouse	Wild Mouse / Large	Conneaut Lake Park	United States	1961	Removed	
Wild Mouse	Wild Mouse / Small	Canobie Lake Park	United States	1962	Removed	
Kiddie Coaster	Unknown	Mountain Park	United States	1962	Removed	
Wild Mouse	Wild Mouse / Small	Saratoga Resort	United States	1963	Removed	
Wild Mouse	Wild Mouse / Large	Olympic Park	United States	1963	Removed	
Coaster	Unknown	Cliff's Amusement Park; Uncle Cliff's Kiddieland	United States	1964; 1959 to 1963	Removed	
Wild Mouse	Wild Mouse / Large	Casino Pier; Beech Bend	United States	1965; Unknown	Removed	
Wild Mouse	Wild Mouse / Large	Orange County Fairgrounds; Fantasy Forest at the Flushing Meadows Carousel	United States	1965; 1965	Removed	
Wild Mouse	Wild Mouse / Large	Lakeview Park	United States	1965	Removed	
Loco Ratón	Wild Mouse / Large	Parque de Atracciones de Montjuic; Coney Island Park	Spain	1966; 1957 to 1966	Removed	
Wild Mouse	Wild Mouse / Large	Bushkill Park; Dorney Park & Wildwater Kingdom	United States	1966; 1958 to 1965	Removed	
Wild Mouse	Wild Mouse / Large	Hocus Pocus Park	United States	1966	Removed	
Wild Mouse	Wild Mouse / Small	Kaydeross Park	United States	1967	Removed	
Unknown; Wild Mouse	Wild Mouse / Large	Frontier Land; Rainbow Gardens	United States	1968; Unknown	Removed	
Wild Beetle Race	Wild Mouse / Large	Pirates World	United States	1967	Removed	
All American Coaster	Unknown	Brookhaven Exchange Club Park	United States	1971	Operating	
Wild Mouse	Wild Mouse / Large	Doling Park	United States	1969	Removed	
Wild Mouse	Wild Mouse / Large	Fun & Games Park; Sans Souci Park	United States	1971; 1958 to 1970	Removed	
Wild Mouse	Wild Mouse / Large	Chippewa Lake Park; Geauga Lake	United States	1972; Unknown	Removed	
Wild Mouse	Wild Mouse / Large	Landa Park	United States	1973	Removed	
Mini-Comet	Unknown	Hersheypark	United States	1974	Removed	
Wild Mouse	Wild Mouse / Large	Fun Fair Park	United States	1977	Removed	
Roller Coaster	Unknown	City Of Miami PBA	United States	1984	Removed	
Wild Mouse	Wild Mouse / Large	Eagle Park	United States	1986	Closed	
Unknown	Wild Mouse / Large	Adventureland Amusement Park	United States	1986	Removed	
Eureka Mountain Mine Ride	Wild Mouse / Large	Dreamworld	Australia	1986	Removed	
Bush Wacker	Unknown	Rainbow Valley	Canada	1992	Removed	
Big Top Sideshow; Formerly Mini Mouse; Formerly Little Leaper	Unknown	Steel Pier	United States	1994	Removed	
Rockin' Roller Coaster	Unknown	Atlantic Playland	Canada	1995	Closed	
Kiddie Coaster	Unknown	Dogwood Lakes	United States	1995	Removed	
Roller Coaster	Unknown	Gulf Shores Amusement Park	United States	2002	Removed	
Roller Coaster; Formerly Flyer; Formerly Flying Coaster	Unknown	Kingston Family Fun World Park; Lake Ontario Park; Crystal Beach Park	Canada	2006; 1977 to 2004; 1960 to 1976	Removed	
Mine Train; Formerly Roller Coaster	Kiddie Coaster / Park Model	Sandham Raceway; Peter Pan's Amusement Park; Great Yarmouth Pleasure Beach	United Kingdom	2007; 1999 to 2005; 1987 to 1998	Removed	
Dinosaur Canyon	Unknown	Deadwood	United States	2008	Operating	
Screamin' Eagle	Unknown	Kingman County and 4-H Fair	United States	2008	Closed	
American Flyer	Unknown	O.D. Pavilion Amusement Park	United States	2010	Removed	
Safari; Formerly Roller Coaster	Unknown	Saunders County Fairgrounds	United States	2012	Operating	
