= Lego Technic Test Track =

Roller coasters at Legoland theme parks

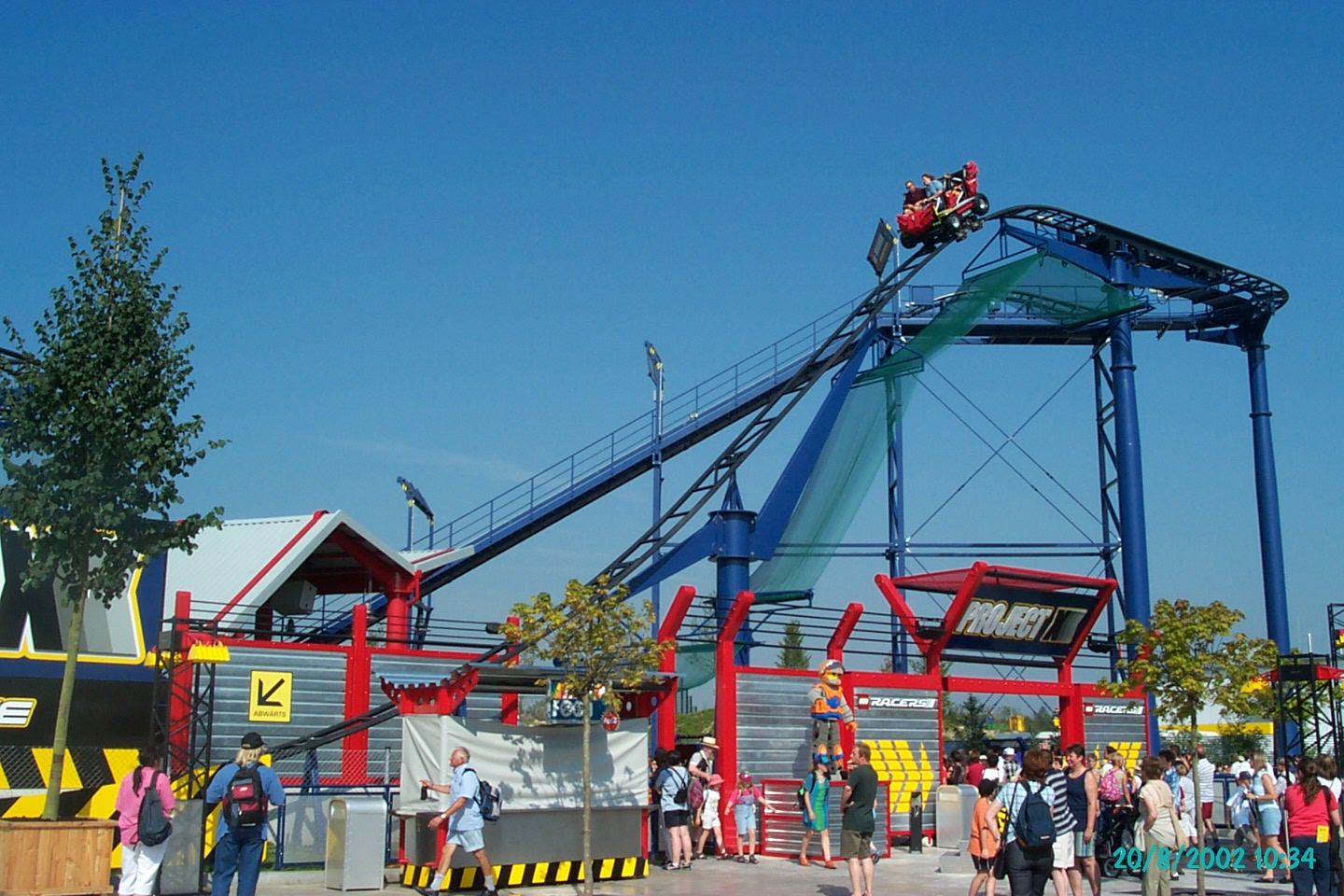
- Legoland Deutschland

Legoland California
- Park section: Imagination Zone
- Coordinates: 33.1275°N 117.3092°W
- Status: Operating
- Opening date: April 7, 2001

Legoland Billund
- Park section: Adventure Land
- Coordinates: 55.7363°N 9.1232°E
- Status: Operating
- Opening date: March 23, 2002

Legoland Deutschland
- Name: Das große LEGO-Rennen
- Park section: Lego X-treme
- Coordinates: 48°25′28″N 10°17′59″E
- Status: Operating
- Opening date: 2002

Legoland Windsor
- Park section: Adventure Land
- Coordinates: 51.46351°N 0.65114°W
- Status: Removed
- Opening date: March 20, 2004
- Closing date: 2009

Legoland Florida
- Park section: Lego Technic
- Coordinates: 27°59′21.02″N 81°41′23.77″W
- Status: Removed
- Opening date: October 15, 2011
- Closing date: 2017
- Replaced by: The Great Lego Race

Legoland Malaysia
- Park section: Lego Technic
- Coordinates: 1°25′30″N 103°37′38″E
- Status: Removed
- Opening date: September 15, 2012
- Closing date: 2017
- Replaced by: The Great Lego Race

General statistics
- Type: Steel – Wild Mouse
- Manufacturer: Mack Rides
- Model: Wild Mouse (large park)
- Lift/launch system: Chain lift hill
- Height: 15.8 m (52 ft)
- Drop: 15.2 m (50 ft)
- Length: 400 m (1,300 ft)
- Speed: 56.3 km/h (35.0 mph)
- Inversions: 0
- Duration: 1:35
- Trains: Several trains with a single car; riders arranged 2 across in 2 rows for a total of 4 riders per train
- Reserve 'N' Ride available
- Lego Technic Test Track at RCDB

Lego Technic Test Track, Das Große Lego-Rennen, Technic Coaster, Project X – Test Strecke and X-treme Racers are the names of five identical steel wild mouse roller coasters (three of which are still operating) manufactured by Mack Rides at Legoland theme parks around the world.

== History ==
The first installation opened at Legoland California in 2001 as Technic Coaster. This was followed by Legoland Deutschland's Project X – Test Strecke and Legoland Billund's X-treme Racers in 2002.

On March 20, 2004, Jungle Coaster opened at Legoland Windsor in the Adventure Land section of the park. The ride however closed in 2009 in preparation of its relocation to Legoland Florida. The site of Jungle Coaster is now occupied by the Legoland Hotel. Jungle Coaster reopened on October 15, 2011, as LEGO TECHNIC Test Track at Legoland Florida in the Lego Technic section of the park.

On September 15, 2012, Legoland Malaysia opened Lego Technic Test Track.

=== The Great Lego Race ===
On November 22, 2017, Project-X at Legoland Malaysia Resort became The Great Lego Race. The upgrade was designed by Merlin Magic Making and opened by Senior Theme Park and Water Park Manager Daan Duijm. The opening of The Great LEGO Race was marketed as the world's first LEGO virtual reality roller coaster.

On March 23, 2018, the Legoland Florida version of Project X became The Great Lego Race, a VR coaster. Although the experience is still the same, it has a brand new theme.

During 2018, the Legoland Deutschland version of Project X was upgraded to The Great Lego Race with VR. In the 2019 season, the ride was downgraded again, but the new name stayed. The only difference compared to the original version is a new entrance design.

== Locations ==
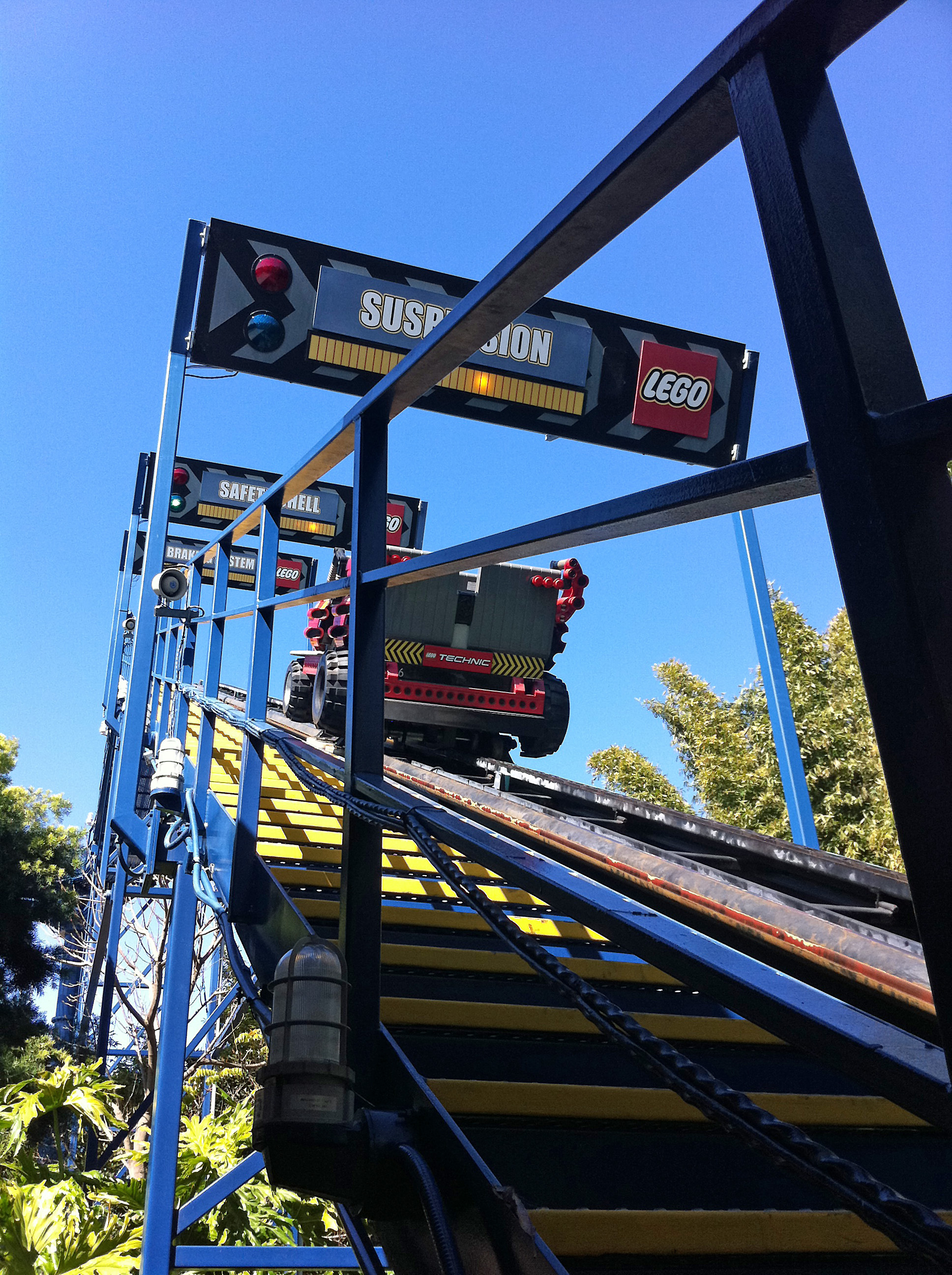
The lift hill of Technic Coaster at Legoland California

Name	Park	Status
Jungle Coaster	Legoland Windsor	Relocated to Legoland Florida
Project-X (formerly Jungle Coaster at Legoland Windsor)	Legoland Florida	Replaced by The Great Lego Race
Project-X	Legoland Malaysia	Replaced by The Great Lego Race
Das große LEGO-Rennen	Legoland Deutschland	Replaced by VR-Version during 2018. New name stayed.
Technic Coaster	Legoland California	Operating
X-treme Racers	Legoland Billund	Operating

== Ride experience ==
Each of the rides are Mack Rides' large park variation of their wild mouse roller coasters. After climbing the lift hill, the train makes a hairpin turn and drops down followed by a normal Wild Mouse track.

== See also ==
- 2011 in amusement parks
- 2012 in amusement parks
- The Fly at Canada's Wonderland, a roller coaster with an identical layout
- Coast Rider at Knott’s Berry Farm, another roller coaster with an identical layout
- Apple Zapple at Kings Dominion
