= Pirate Reef =

Ride at Legoland California

Legoland California
- Area: Pirate Shores
- Status: Operating
- Opening date: May 24, 2012

General statistics
- Type: Shoot-the-Chutes
- Manufacturer: Hopkins Rides
- Lift system: 1 chain lift hill
- Height: 25 ft (7.6 m)
- Virtual queue: Reserve 'N' Ride available

Pirate Reef is a Hopkins shoot-the-chutes ride at Legoland California. The ride opened on May 24, 2012.

== History ==
On January 19, 2012, Legoland California confirmed that they would build a new attraction for the 2012 season called Pirate Reef, a Hopkins shoot-the-chutes attraction. It is themed to pirates and features 28 new Lego models for the park. The 28 new models are made out of 250,000 Lego bricks.

Pirate Reef is located in the "Pirate Shores" area of the park or from the nearby separate-admission Legoland Water Park.

== Ride ==
Once aboard Pirate Reef, the boat goes up an 25 feet (7.6 m) lift hill and then takes the boat to incomplete circle to the left. Once the boat goes around the circle, the boat dives down to the bottom, generating a splash at the end to soak the riders and any bystanders on the bridge. The bridge includes two Lego-themed pirate boats, where guests can stand or squirt riders.

== See also ==
- 2012 in amusement parks
