= Suburban Park (Manlius, New York) =

Suburban Park was an amusement complex located along today's New York State Route 92 just southeast of Manlius, New York. Operating primarily on Saturdays and Sundays, it featured a bandstand and dance floor, which at times served as ice skating rink, an arcade with games, and an amusement park with rides. For a few years it had a wild mouse-type ride. It was accessible by public bus, and was the end of the line for the Syracuse and Eastern's Manlius Line.

Originally it was built in 1898 adjacent to a new electric plant, which powered the electric trolley from Syracuse, as well as the Park.

It hosted flea markets, dances, and other community events. In 1973 the Park closed, and apartments were built on the land. There is a Facebook group on the Park.
