= Wild Mouse (Luna Park Sydney) =

Historic roller coaster in New South Wales, Australia

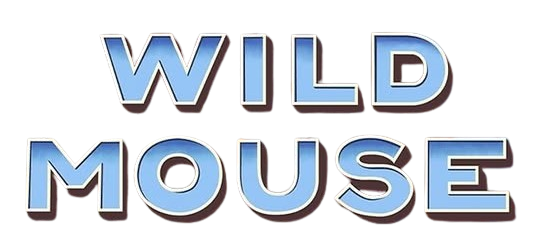

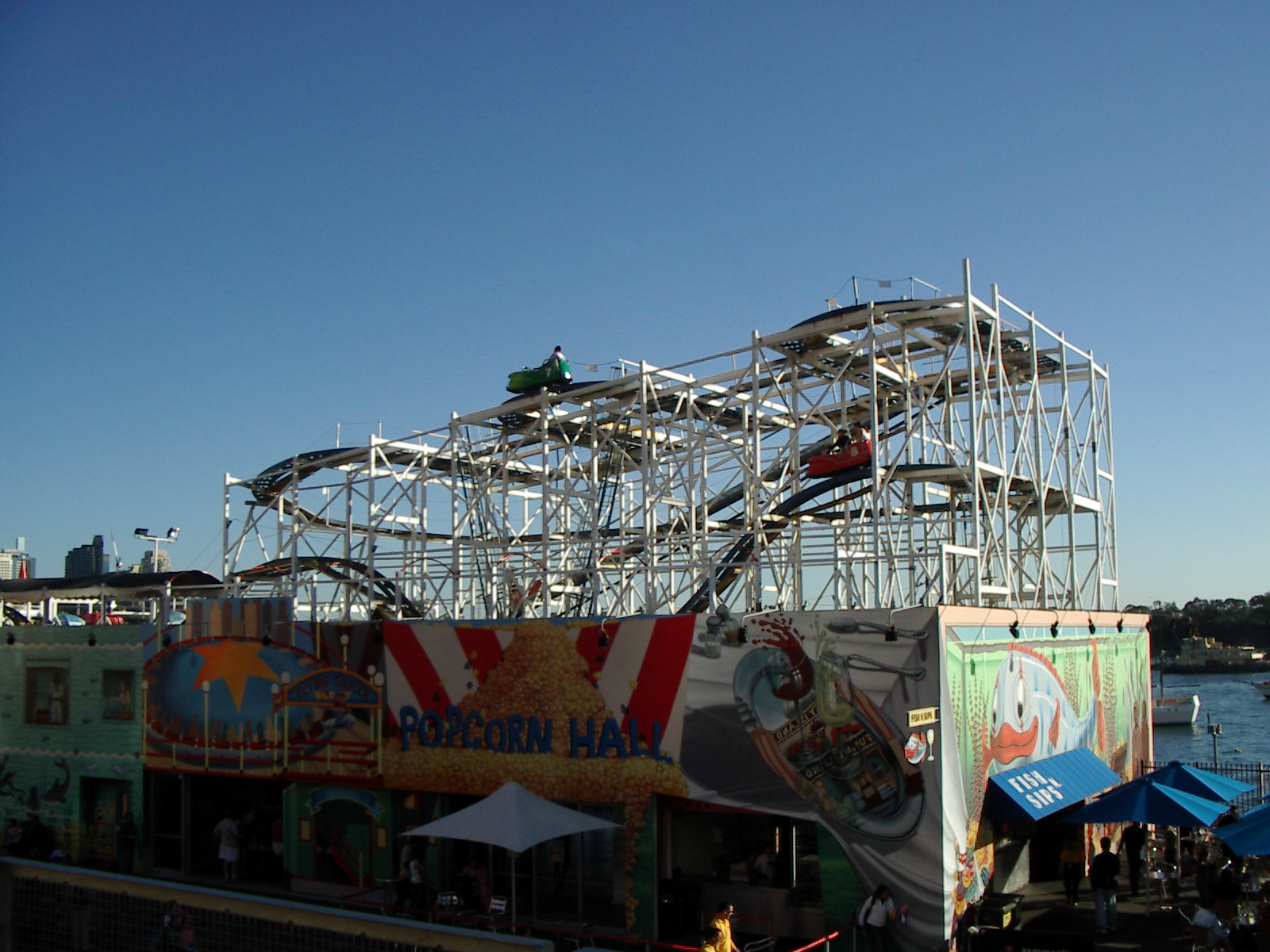
- Wild Mouse in 2006

Luna Park Sydney
- Location: Luna Park Sydney
- Coordinates: 33°50′51″S 151°12′34″E
- Status: Operating
- Opening date: 1963

General statistics
- Type: Wood
- Model: Wild Mouse
- Length: 400 m (1,300 ft)
- Duration: 61 seconds
- Restraint style: Seatbelt
- Trains: 9 trains with a single car. Riders are arranged 1 across in 2 rows for a total of 2 riders per train.
- Wild Mouse at RCDB

Wild Mouse is a heritage listed wooden roller coaster at Luna Park Sydney in Milsons Point, New South Wales. First opened in 1963, the ride is one of only three surviving wooden wild mouse rollercoasters in the world. Despite being removed from Luna Park on multiple occasions, Wild Mouse has been a permanent attraction at the park since 1995, and was listed on the New South Wales State Heritage Register in 2010.

== History ==
After the Second World War, Luna Park managers David Atkins and Ted Hopkins travelled the world to find new attractions to revitalise and increase attendance of their park. In 1951, they secured a patent for the Rotor after viewing the ride at the Festival of Britain. The ride was an immediate success at Luna Park and still operates today.

After Atkins' passing in 1957, Hopkins visited the United States. He took interest in purchasing a Wild Mouse for Luna Park after seeing one operating in 1958, however no arrangements were made. In 1962, Hopkins visited the Seattle World's Fair with business partner Dick Pearce, where they observed a Mack Rides model. The pair purchased plans and secured the rights to build and distribute clones of the ride in Australia, importing a car from America to be reproduced locally.

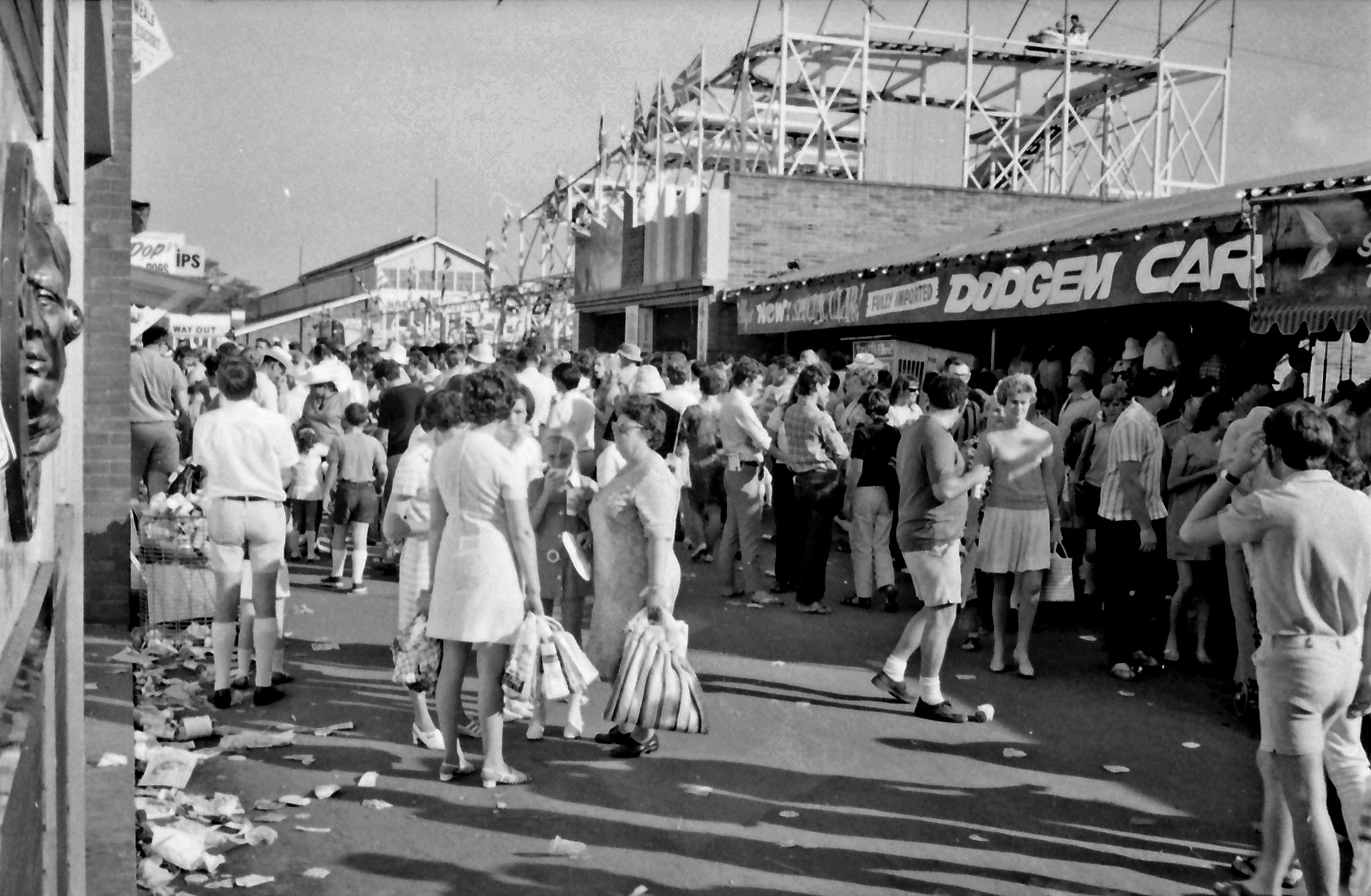
Wild Mouse (top right) operating at the Sydney Royal Easter Show in 1970

Three Wild Mice were built on-site at Luna Park by Girvan Bros. under the direction of Hopkins and Pearce. The first would operate at Luna Park between September and February, and would be removed during the off-season to operate at the Sydney and Brisbane Showgrounds. The other two would remain at the Perth and Melbourne Showgrounds.

Photographs and records of the construction of the Sydney installation are held by the State Library of New South Wales, dated 1962. Once completed, the ride operated for its first time at the 1963 Sydney Royal Easter Show, followed a few months later by the Ekka. The ride opened at Luna Park in September 1963.

In 1969, Hopkins sold the lease of Luna Park to new owners, who sold and replaced Wild Mouse with a higher capacity Schwarzkopf Wild Cat. Wild Cat operated at Luna Park until its closure in 1979 as a result of the Ghost Train fire.

When Luna Park was redeveloped throughout the early 1990s, travelling ride operator Wittingslow Amusements was brought on as an operator of the new park, and to provide attractions. Wittingslow had been in possession of one of the Hopkins & Pearce Wild Mice, and it reopened with the park in January 1995. The ride was refurbished when the park was redeveloped again between 2001 and 2004.

In 2010, the Luna Park Precinct and many of its buildings and attractions, including Wild Mouse and Rotor, were listed on the New South Wales State Heritage Register.

In 2022, the ride closed and was moved offsite for an extensive rebuild and refurbishment, reopening in 2025. The ride remains one of the park's most popular attractions.

As of 2025, the three Hopkins & Pearce rides are the last wooden Wild Mice left operating in the World. Alongside the Luna Park installation, the other two currently operate in Indonesia, at Jawa Timur Park and Wisata Bahari Lamongan.

== Ride experience ==
=== Layout ===
Riders board the ride's cars at the load platform, before being manually pushed by an attendant to a holding brake before the chain lift hill. After being dispatched by the ride operator, riders' cars will ascend the lift hill to the ride's highest point before immediately entering a series of switchback turns. Following a sweeping downwards right-hand turn is a straight track, followed by two more right-hand turns which directly precede the ride's first drop. Riders ascend and descend a large camelback, before entering a long unbanked right-hand turn travelling over the ride's load platform and queue, directly followed by a sharp S-Bend. Ride vehicles then descend another drop, traverse a smaller camelback, followed by two more right-hand turns before the final brake run. Riders alight their cars at the unload platform.

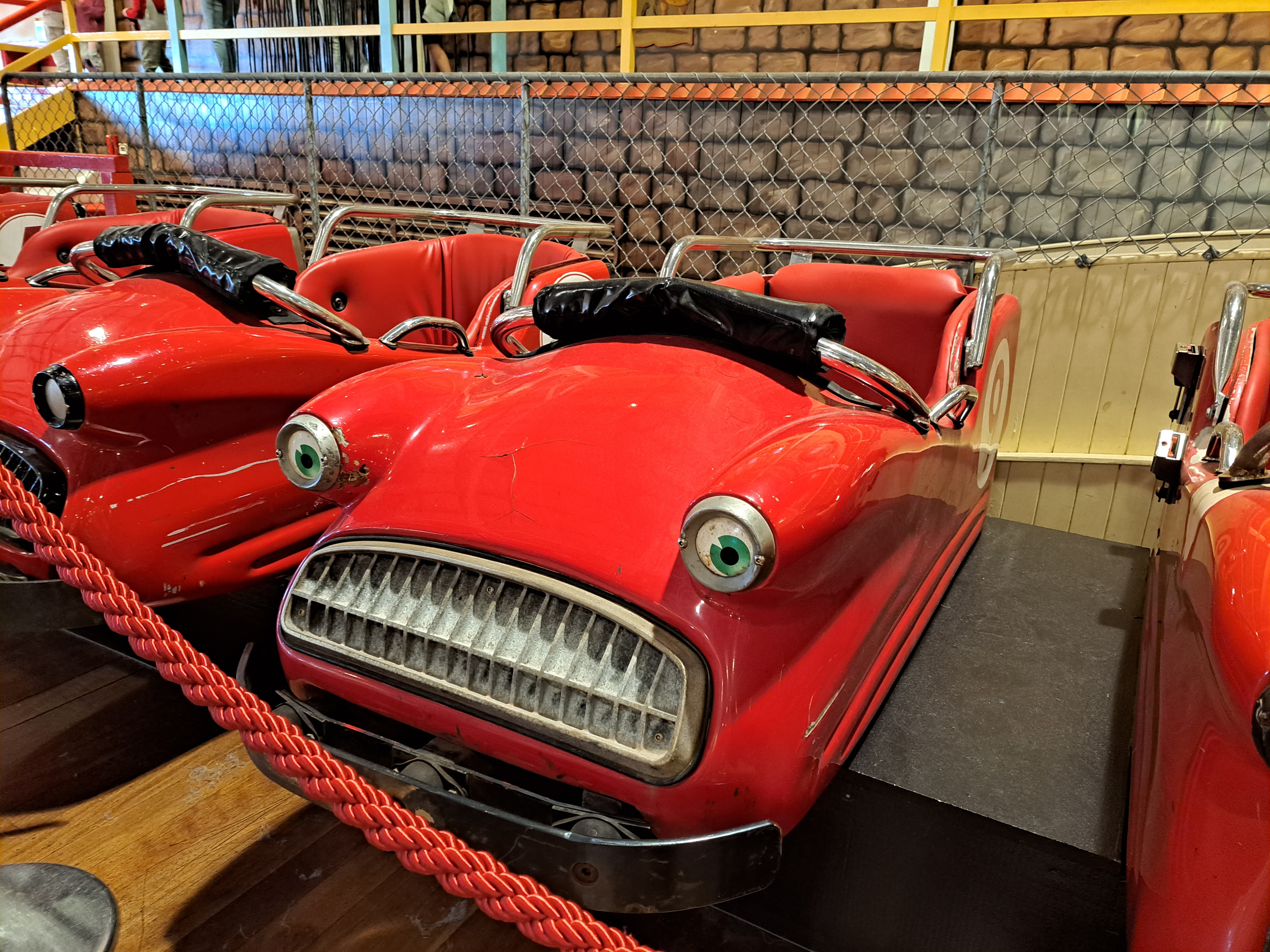
One of the ride's cars, removed from the track.

=== Ride vehicles ===
The ride has 9 cars. Each car features a single seat which can hold up to two riders, seated single-file. Riders are secured by seatbelts on their laps.
