= Apple Zapple (Kings Dominion) =

Roller coaster in Doswell, Virginia, US

- Previously known as Ricochet (2002-2017)
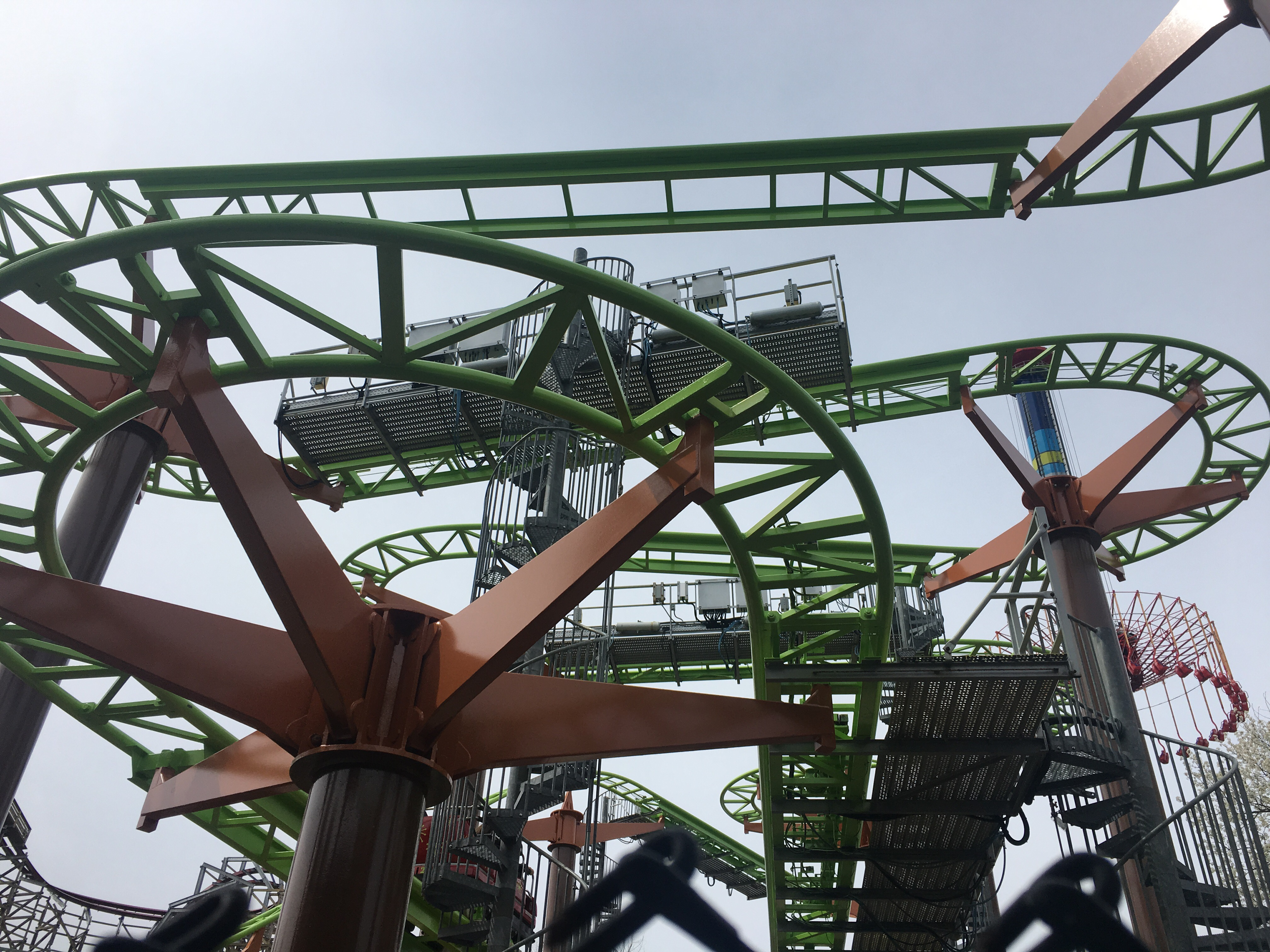
- Apple Zapple

Kings Dominion
- Location: Kings Dominion
- Park section: Candy Apple Grove
- Coordinates: 37.836693°N 77.445337°W
- Status: Operating
- Opening date: March 23, 2002

General statistics
- Type: Steel – Wild Mouse
- Manufacturer: Mack Rides
- Model: Wild Mouse / Large Park
- Track layout: Wild Mouse
- Lift/launch system: Chain lift hill
- Height: 52 ft (16 m)
- Drop: 50 ft (15 m)
- Length: 1,312 ft (400 m)
- Speed: 35 mph (56 km/h)
- Inversions: 0
- Capacity: 960 riders per hour
- Height restriction: 44 in (112 cm)
- Trains: 10 trains with a single car. Riders are arranged 2 across in 2 rows for a total of 4 riders per train.
- Apple Zapple at RCDB

Apple Zapple (formerly known as Ricochet) is a Wild Mouse roller coaster located at Kings Dominion in Doswell, Virginia.

== History ==
On August 1, 2001, Kings Dominion announced that they would be adding Ricochet. The coaster opened on March 23, 2002.

In February 2018, as part of general renovations to the "Candy Apple Grove" area, it was announced Ricochet would be renamed Apple Zapple, to better fit the area's theme. The ride reopened under its new name on March 24, 2018.

== Ride experience ==
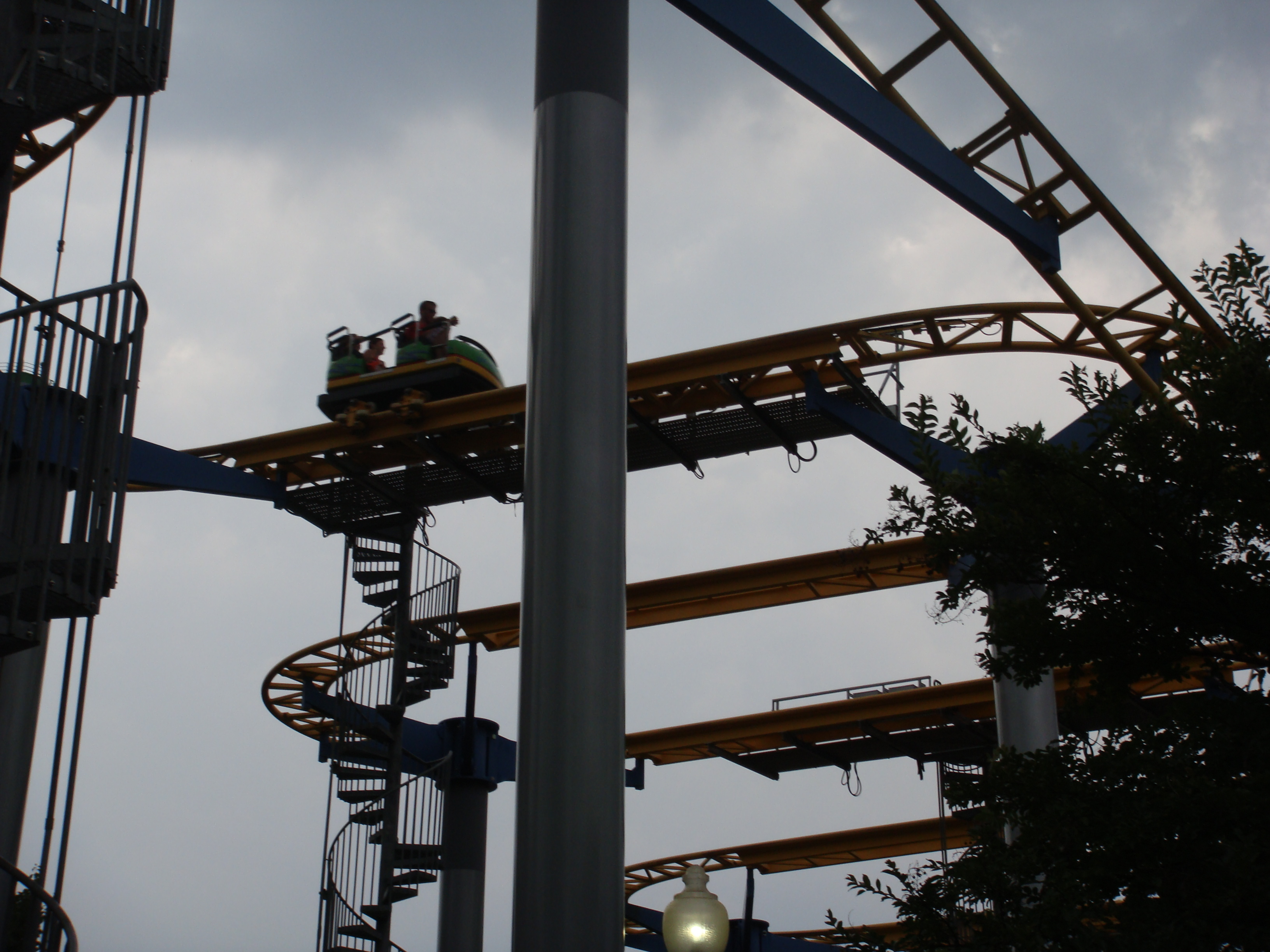
Apple Zapple while it was known as Ricochet

Apple Zapple features ten trains with two rows of two riders. The ride is 1,312.3 feet (400.0 m) long and reaches a top speed of 35 miles per hour (56 km/h). The track layout consists of hairpin turns followed by a pair of steep drops.
