= Lake Ontario Park =

Park in Kingston, Ontario, Canada

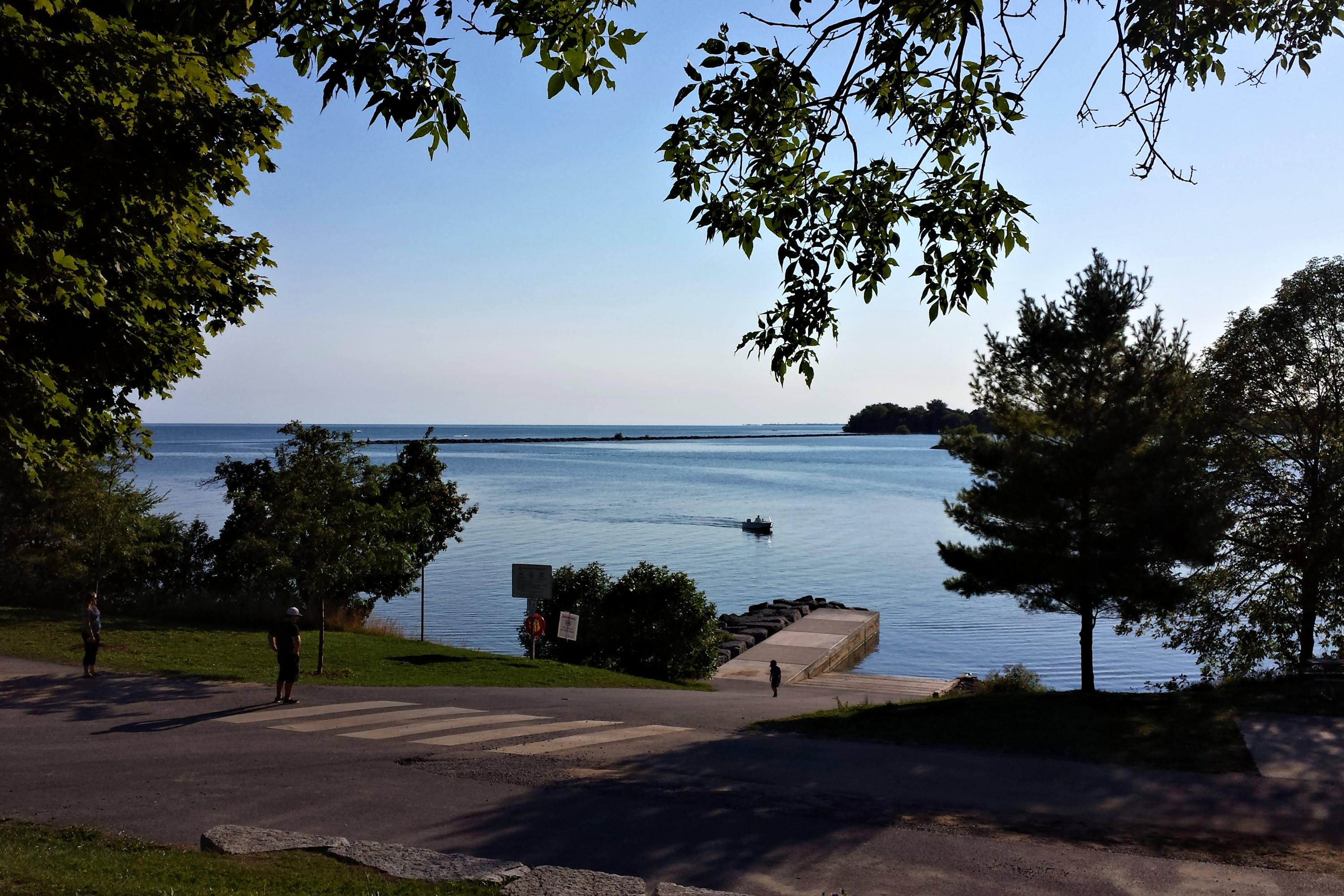
- Interactive map of Lake Ontario Park
- Type: Municipal
- Location: Kingston, Ontario, Canada
- Coordinates: 44°13′00″N 76°31′49″W
- Area: 37 acres (15 ha)
- Created: 1894
- Operator: City of Kingston, Ontario
- Visitors: ??
- Status: Open all year

Lake Ontario Park is a municipal park located in Kingston, Ontario, Canada, on the east side of Cataraqui Bay on the shore of Lake Ontario.

The park, which dates from 1894, is a day-use facility with picnic areas, picnic pavilion, walkways, and children's playgrounds. The city acquired the park from the street railway company in 1930, the last year of streetcar service in Kingston.

Its once popular campground closed in 2005 and the park's many amusement rides and refreshment booths have been removed. In 2006 the City of Kingston completed an exercise to obtain public feedback on the park's future.

The park was refurbished and officially reopened on June 23, 2013 with washrooms, a play structure, walking paths to the shoreline, a beach volleyball court and a natural skating rink for the winter.

Thousands attend on Victoria Day at dusk (third Monday in May), to enjoy a large fireworks display over Cataraqui Bay, as well as live music performances.
