= Wild Mouse (Hersheypark) =

Roller coaster at Hersheypark

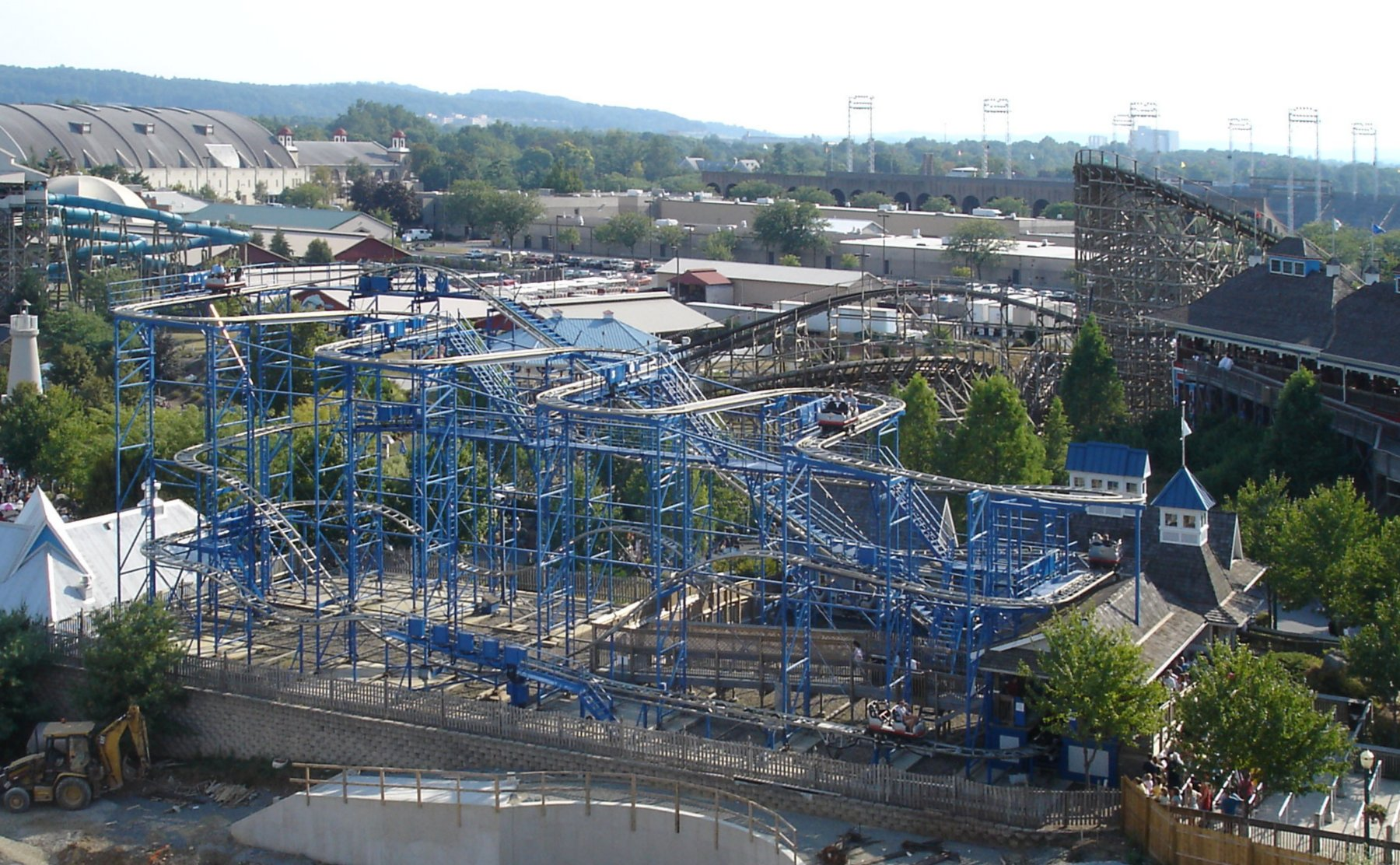
- Full layout

Hersheypark
- Location: Hersheypark
- Coordinates: 40.292515°N 76.654774°W
- Status: Operating
- Opening date: May 8, 1999

General statistics
- Type: Steel
- Manufacturer: Mack Rides
- Designer: Corbin Stengal
- Model: Compact wild mouse
- Track layout: Wild mouse
- Lift/launch system: Chain
- Height: 45 ft (14 m)
- Length: 1,213 ft (370 m)
- Speed: 28 mph (45 km/h)
- Duration: 1:58
- Capacity: 835 riders per hour
- Height restriction: 48 in (122 cm)
- Trains: 10 trains with a single car; riders arranged 2 across in 2 rows for a total of 4 riders per train
- Wild Mouse at RCDB

Wild Mouse is a steel wild mouse roller coaster located in Hersheypark designed by Mack Rides in 1999. It is located in the Midway America section of Hersheypark. Riders are placed in single carts on a thin track. The ride frequently makes sharp turns, giving riders the illusion they are about to fall off the track. When this occurs the riders are jerked as they turn.

Hersheypark usually runs their Wild Mouse with very little braking on the upper level, loading slow-moving cars in the station, and allows four adults per car. By comparison, Dorney Park & Wildwater Kingdom's Wild Mouse is run with more brake pressure, cars stop to load in the station, and the park allows a two-adult restriction. Despite these differences, and the different manufacturers, the ride layout of these two Wild Mouse coasters are nearly identical (designed by Werner Stengel). The Wild Mouse features an on-ride camera during one of the drops.

On opening day in 2015, the ride got stuck and riders needed to evacuate. In 2025, the ride was stopped after a guest dropped a sweatshirt on the ride, causing a possible safety issue. All riders were evacuated safely.

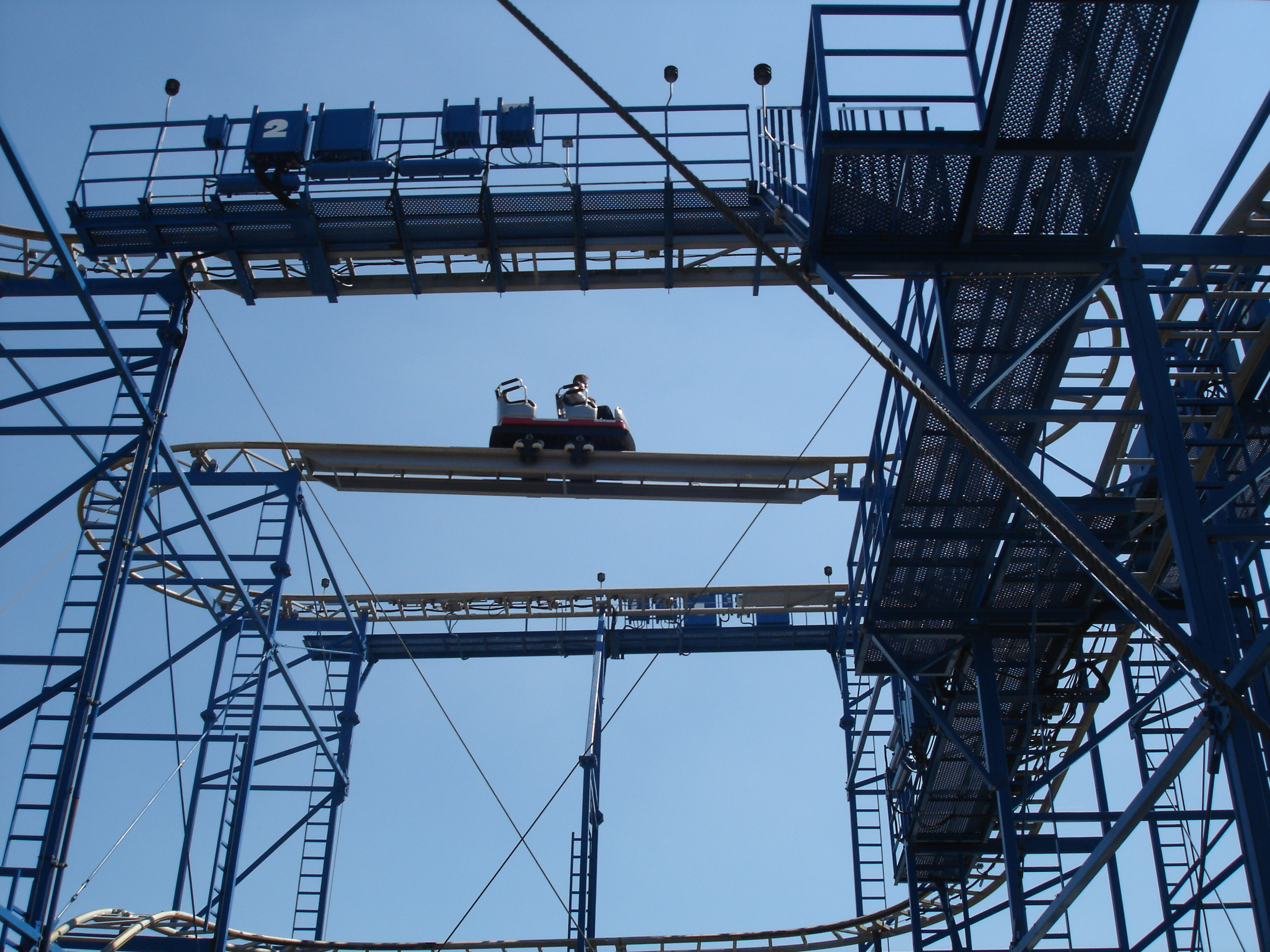
Wild Mouse's curves
