= Legoland California =

Theme park in Carlsbad, California

Legoland California Resort

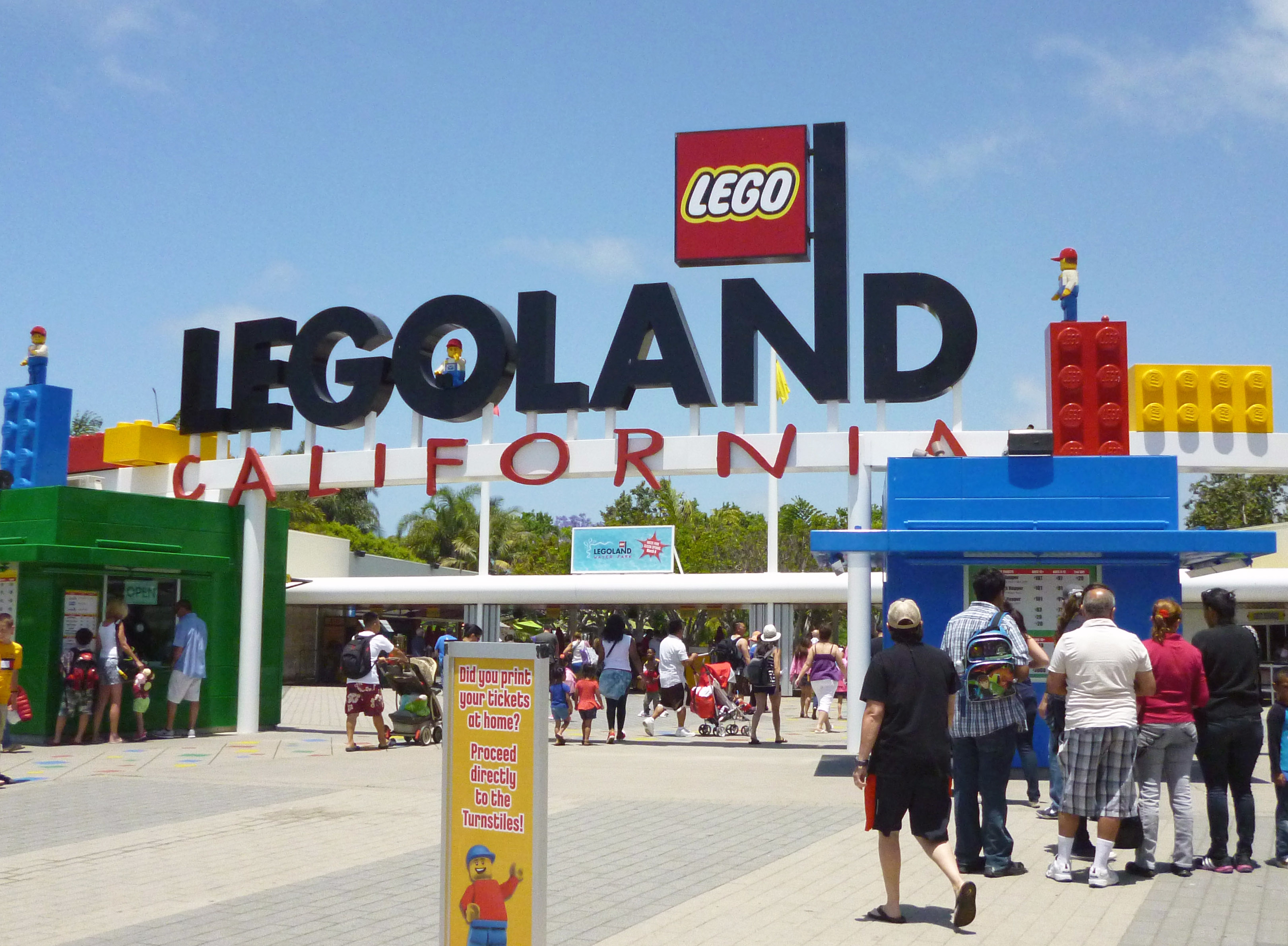
- Legoland California main entrance
- Interactive map of Legoland California Resort
- Location: Legoland California Resort, Carlsbad, California, United States
- Coordinates: 33°7′36″N 117°18′40″W
- Status: Operating
- Opened: March 20, 1999; 27 years ago
- Owner: Merlin Entertainments
- General manager: Kurt Stocks
- Theme: Lego toys and childhood amusement
- Operating season: Year-round
- Attendance: 1.4 million (2004)
- Area: 128 acres (52 ha)

Attractions
- Total: more than 60 rides
- Roller coasters: 4
- Water rides: 8
- Website: Official website

Legoland California Resort is a theme park in Carlsbad, California, United States, about 35 miles (56 km) north of San Diego. Opening on March 20, 1999, it was the first Legoland park to open outside of Europe. It has over 60 rides, shows, and attractions, plus a water park, an aquarium and two hotels. The park is currently owned by Merlin Entertainments, which took a controlling interest in 2005. The second park in the United States is Legoland Florida, which opened in 2011. A third park, Legoland New York, opened in May 2021.

== Resort ==
The Legoland California Resort currently encompasses:

- The original park (opened in March 1999)
- A Lego-themed Sea Life Aquarium (opened in August 2008), the first Sea Life in the United States
- A Lego-themed water park (opened in May 2010)
  - A Lego Chima expansion to the water park (opened in 2014)

The resort site includes two hotels:

- Legoland Resort Hotel (250 rooms, opened in April 2013)
  - The first floor has rooms based on Kingdoms, Ninjago, Friends, and Duplo.
  - The second floor has rooms based on Pirates and City.
  - The third floor has rooms based on Adventure.
- Legoland Castle Hotel (250 rooms, opened in April 2018)

=== History ===
Lego opened the first Legoland theme park in Billund, Denmark in 1968, followed by a second park in Windsor, England in 1996. The Carlsbad park was the third to open, in March 1999. At the time, Lego was considering an additional United States Legoland to be located somewhere on the east coast. When the park opened, there were eight themed areas. Starting at the entrance (at the central southern part of the park) and proceeding clockwise, they were:

Themed areas and key locations within Legoland California Resort
- The Beginning (park entrance and gift shop)
- Village Green (including Playtown for toddlers)
- The Ridge
- Fun Town
- The Garden
- Miniland (including The Lake in the center of the park)
- Castle Hill
- Imagination Zone
- LEGO Galaxy

By 2002, Village Green and The Ridge had been combined into an area called Explore Village and the Aquazone and LEGO Technic Test Track rides had been installed at Imagination Zone. The fourth Legoland, built in Germany, opened in 2002. Dino Island and Coastersaurus opened in April 2004; the park also added Fun Town Fire Academy, a Florida-themed Miniland area, and the Block of Fame for its fifth anniversary.

Legoland California installed the first KUKA RoboCoaster in the United States in 2005. However, the weak retail toy market led to the sale of the four Legoland theme parks in July 2005 for $456 million to Blackstone Capital Partners, a private equity firm based in the United States. Blackstone had previously purchased Merlin in May 2005, which owned the Sea Life and London Dungeon; the two assets were combined as Merlin Entertainments, with Lego taking a 30% ownership share in the combined Merlin Entertainments. Collectively, the four theme parks had approximately 5 million visitors per year at the time.

Under Merlin, Legoland California would add Pirate Shores (2006), a Las Vegas-themed Miniland area (2007), the Egyptian explorer-themed Land of Adventure (2008), and the 5.5-acre (2.2 ha) Legoland Water Park (2010). In 2009, Merlin requested permission to develop an onsite Lego-themed hotel in the existing parking lot; permission was granted in October and plans for the 250-room hotel were announced in 2011, making the site a resort in 2013. The first fictional Miniland area, themed with scenes from the six (at the time) Star Wars movies and the Clone Wars television series, opened in March 2011. The water park was expanded in 2014 with a Chima-themed area. A second 250-room hotel with a castle theme was added in 2018.

Attendance at Legoland California reached 2.5 million visitors in 2013 and nearly 3 million by 2015, nearly double the attendance of Legoland Florida. More than $20 million was spent per year on sales tax on food and merchandise. The park employed more than 2200 workers in total: 600 full-time, nearly 500 part-time, and more than 1100 seasonal.

In mid-March 2020, in line with other Legoland parks, the park was indefinitely shut down because of the COVID-19 pandemic and reopened on April 1, 2021.

== Theme park ==
=== Dino Valley (formerly Explorer Island) ===
Dino Valley is a section with themes of dinosaurs and exploration. It contains a large sand area where children may dig for "fossils" and the Gerstlauer-built Coastersaurus mini steel roller coaster, a close copy of the Legoland Germany junior coaster Drachenjagd, with a ride duration of approximately 2 minutes. It was installed in 2004 by Ride Entertainment Group, who handles all of Gerstlauer's operations in the Western Hemisphere.

Explorer Island was previously named Dino Island. When the Village Green/Explore Village area was taken over by Heartlake City, the Fairy Tale Brook boat ride and Safari Trek on-rail driving ride (originally a walking trail showing life-size African animals built with LEGO bricks) were counted as part of the renamed Explorer Island. These rides date back to the opening of the park.

Explorer Island was rethemed and renamed "Dino Valley" and opened on March 22nd, 2024.

Attraction	Added	Manufacturer	Image	Description
Coastersaurus	2004	Gerstlauer		Gerstlauer Junior Coaster, installed in 2004.
Explorer River Quest	2024	Intamin		Boat ride featuring large-scale LEGO models of various Dinosaurs.
DUPLO® Little Dino Trail	2024			On-rail driving ride featuring life-size DUPLO dinosaurs.

=== The LEGO Movie World (formerly LEGO Friends Heartlake City and DUPLO Village) ===
The Heartlake City section, which opened on May 21, 2015, is based on the Lego Friends brand marketed to girls. The area features Heartlake Fountain, a water play area; Friends Forever Stage, where musical performances occur; Heartlake Stables, a play area and building zone; and Mia's Riding Camp, a carousel.

Heartlake City replaced Duplo Village, which included a set of musical fountains and water features collectively called the "Water Works". A temporary installation of the sets from The Lego Movie opened in 2014 at Duplo Village.

"DUPLO Playtown", a play area for little kids, and "LEGOLAND Express", a mini locomotive ride through the Playtown used to be in the Duplo Village/Heartlake City area. When Heartlake City opened, "DUPLO Playtown" and "LEGOLAND Express" became part of the nearby area, Fun Town. On May 9, 2019, DUPLO Playtown reopened in the queue of the Kid Power Tower. In that same year, Heartlake City was removed and replaced with a Lego Movie themed area in 2021.

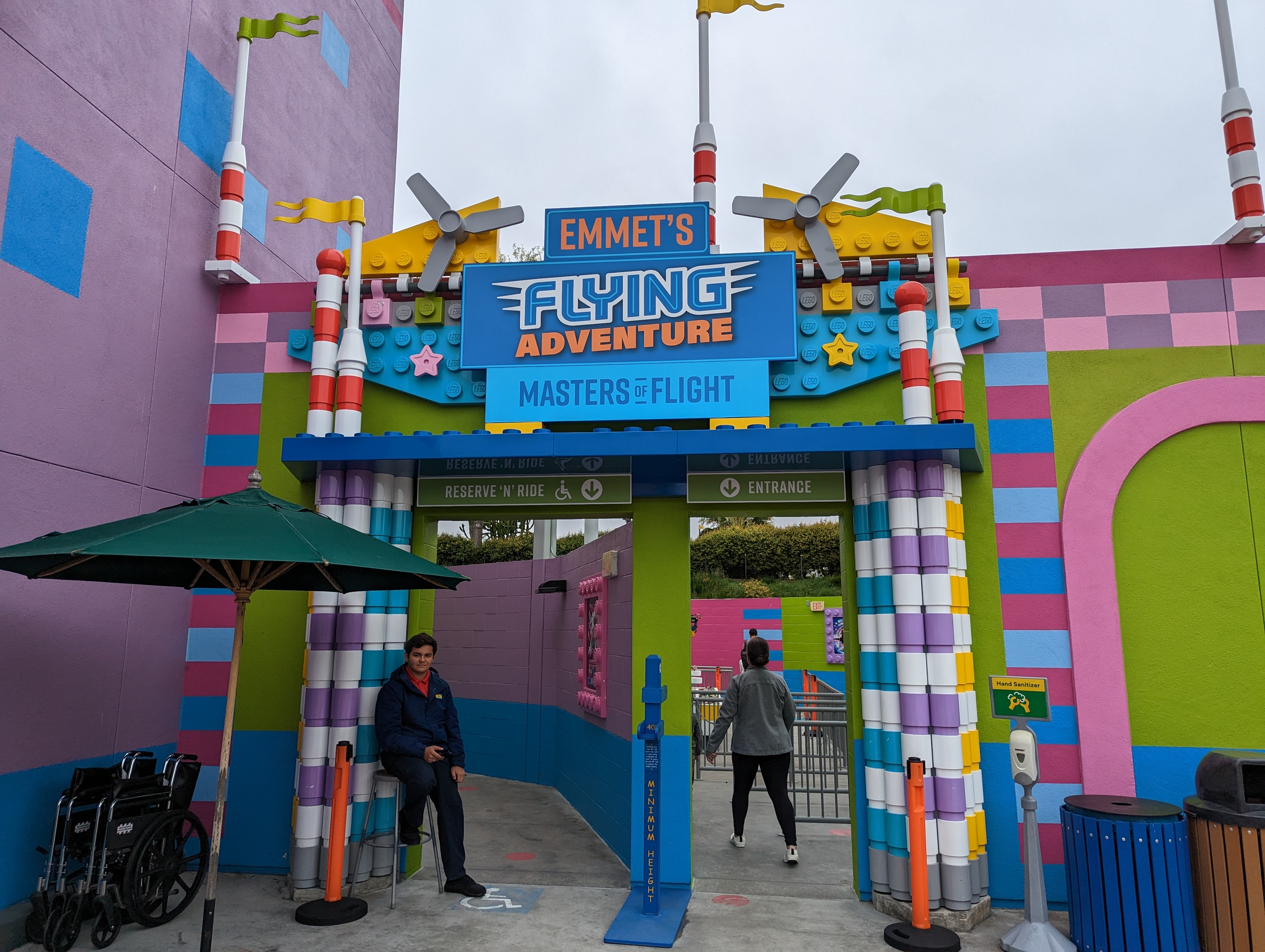
Entrance to Emmet's Flying Adventure

In spring 2020, LEGOLAND California Resort was scheduled to open their biggest addition in the history of the park, The Lego Movie World. The opening was delayed until May 27, 2021, due to the COVID-19 pandemic. The area features Emmet's Flying Adventure – Masters of Flight, a flying theatre attraction (similar to Soarin' at EPCOT and Disney California Adventure). Unlike Florida and Billund, this version will include two theatres rather than one. This area will also feature Unikitty's Disco Drop, a drop attraction where riders seated in four pairs raise, drop, and spin around a pole. It features two towers. There is also a carousel called Queen Watevra's Carousel, from LEGO Friends Heartlake City. Additionally, there is also a build area, Build Watevra You Wa'Na Build, and small playground, Benny's Playship, with two tall twisty slides that look like a rocket. There is also a splash pad with fountains, a convenience store, three dining locations, Everything is Ramen (a ramen quick service location), Cloud Cuckoo Crêpes (a crêpe stand), and Benny's Rocket Fuel (basic food stand with popcorn and pretzels).

Attractions:

- Emmet's Flying Adventure
- Unikitty's Disco Drop!
- Queen Waterva's Carousel
- Emmet's Super Suite
- Benny's Playship
- Build Waterva You Wa'Na Build

=== Fun Town ===
Fun Town is a role-playing amusement area where guests simulate adult skills or professional identities, such as driving cars, steering boats, or fighting fires.

Attraction	Added	Manufacturer	Image	Description
DUPLO Playtown	1999			Playground for young children
Legoland Express	1999			Small train ride within Playtown
Driving School	1999	SB International		Children aged 6 to 13 years drive self-propelled Lego cars on a closed circuit featuring multiple intersections, two way traffic and traffic signals. It is designed to promote safe driving and skills. Volvo became the sponsor shortly after the park's 5th anniversary in 2004.
Junior Driving School	1999	SB International		Children aged 3 to 5 years drive similar self-propelled Lego cars on a simple oval.
Skipper School	1999	SB International		Self-propelled boat-ride that travels a winding water course
Kid Power Towers	1999	Heege		Tower ride where riders pull themselves up the ride with a rope
Adventurer's Club	1999			Walk-through attraction with scenes such as ancient Egypt, a rainforest, and the arctic
LEGO Factory Tour	1999			Walk-through attraction that teaches young children how LEGO models are made
Rebuild the World	1999			A room where you can build your own LEGO models with occasional classes teaching children techniques on building LEGO models

=== LEGO Galaxy ===
LEGO Galaxy is a space-themed land featuring several rides, with the most notable being Galacticoaster, an indoor family coaster. The land was first opened at Legoland Florida on February 27, 2026, before opening to the public at California on March 6. Galaxy replaced most of Fun Town, with the old Driving School being replaced by Galacticoaster; the driving school was relocated to the former site of Police & Fire Academy. With that came the addition of another new ride, the G-Force Test Facility, which replaced the old Junior Driving School. The only ride that was not a new addition is Launch and Land, which was previously known as Sky Patrol.

Attraction	Added	Manufacturer	Image	Description
Galacticoaster	2026	ART Engineering		Indoor family coaster where guests are able to design their ship, with several combinations possible. Ride vehicles can reach a top speed of 40 mph. First indoor coaster at the park since opening.
G-Force Test Facility	2026			Spinning ride where riders are elevated, tilted, and twisted around, simulating forces felt by astronauts in space.
Launch and Land	2026			Space-themed helicopter ride where guests are able to go up and down in the air and spin in place.

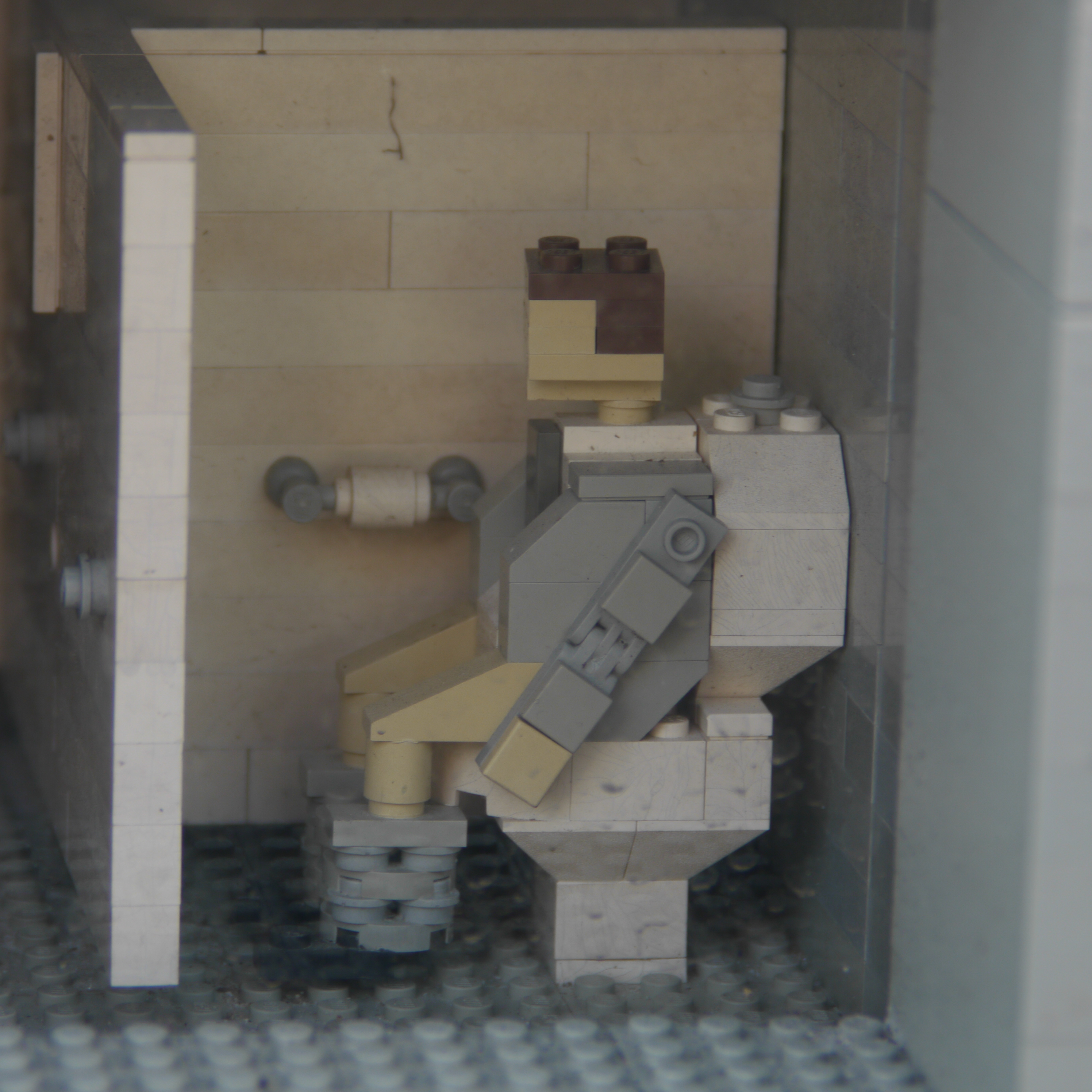
A Lego man using the toilet in Legoland California's Grand Central Station model

=== Miniland USA ===
Miniland USA is a 1:20 scale model miniature park featuring prominent architecture and symbols from seven areas in the United States. Certain models are visible throughout the Legoland park. It was constructed over the course of three years using more than 20 million LEGO bricks. The Coast Cruise ride, which departs from Miniland USA, travels through the lake in the center of Legoland. The lake covers 1.73 acres (0.70 ha).

Miniland includes the Model Shop, the main design and building office for Legoland's US parks. A large viewing window allows guests to watch master model builders working on new models. Repairs and refurbishment of existing models are also conducted in the Model Shop.

Certain model builders have inserted incongruous scenes into the Miniland vignettes, including a businessman mooning the presidential motorcade and a man using the toilet in the Grand Central Station model. Miniland officials insist all such scenes are incorporated with full management knowledge and approval.

The Star Wars-themed Miniland was expanded with a life-size model of an X-wing starfighter, on display in 2013. A large-scale model of the Death Star was added in 2015, along with a recreation of the trench run scene from the climax of Episode IV. Scenes from The Force Awakens were added in 2017, including what was billed as the longest LEGO model for Star Wars Miniland, a 16 ft (4.9 m) long Resurgent-class Star Destroyer Finalizer.

On January 6, 2020, Star Wars Miniland was permanently closed.

Attraction	Added	Manufacturer	Image	Description
Coast Cruise	1999	Morgan Manufacturing		8-minute-long boat ride where guests can view many monuments such as the Sydney Opera House, Taj Mahal, Eiffel Tower, London Eye, and Mount Rushmore, as well as a few other interesting models such as the depiction of a scene from Gulliver's Travels
New England	1999			Depicts a New England harbor and local architecture
Las Vegas	2007			Depicts the Las Vegas Strip with its famous hotels such as Tropicana Las Vegas, Mirage Las Vegas, and the Stratosphere Tower.
Washington, DC	1999			Depicts the National Mall with monuments such as the U.S. Capitol, Washington Monument, and the Smithsonian Castle
Block of Fame	2004			Park walkway with LEGO busts of famous individuals such as George Washington, Marilyn Monroe, and Winston Churchill. Installed in 2004.
Ferndale	1999			Depicts the Ferndale Main Street Historic District in Ferndale, California
Model Shop	1999		A view into the Model Shop	Viewing area for the park's model shop, where many of Legoland California's models are built
New Orleans	1999–2023			Depicts New Orleans and its many waterways. Replaced by San Diego in 2023.
New York	1999			Depicts Manhattan Island of New York City with models of places like Central Park and Times Square. The model of Downtown Manhattan included the 2002 design of One World Trade Center; the model has since been updated to match the finished skyscraper.
San Francisco	1999			Depicts San Francisco with models including Pier 39, the Golden Gate Bridge, and the Transamerica Pyramid
Southern California	1999			Depicts Southern California with models including the TCL Chinese Theatre, Oceanside Pier, and Mission San Luis Rey. In 2018, the entire area aside from the Hollywood Sign and the Griffith Observatory was taken down to be replaced.
Star Wars Miniland	2011–2020			Depicted seven Star Wars movies, including the Clone Wars movie Opened in 2011, replacing a Florida-themed Miniland whose models were moved to the Winter Haven park.
San Diego	2023			Depicts San Diego landmarks such as Petco Park, Santa Fe Depot, San Diego Convention Center, and Coronado (including Hotel del Coronado). There is also an MTS trolley that runs around the area.

=== Castle Hill ===
Castle Hill is a medieval castle-themed area. The area includes one roller coaster and a wooden playground for little kids.

In 2005, Legoland opened the Wild Woods Golf putting course decorated with off-green LEGO models on the west side of Castle Hill. Wild Woods Golf and the neighboring Enchanted Walk were replaced by the submarine ride LEGO City: Deep Sea Adventure, which opened in July 2018.

Attraction	Added	Manufacturer	Image	Description
The Dragon	1999	Vekoma		Family steel roller coaster with the first segment of the ride acting like a dark ride through a castle. 20 riders per 10-car train.
The Hideaways	1999			Large multi-level wooden playground designed for younger children, structure with slides, rope ladders, and bridges.
LEGO City: Deep Sea Adventure	2018	Mack Rides		12 riders per submarine on a voyage through a 350,000 US gal (1,300,000 L) aquarium populated with LEGO-themed decorations and 2,000 live animals. Similar to submarine rides at Legoland Dubai and Windsor; costliest single upgrade to any Legoland park at the time it opened.
The Royal Joust	1999	Metallbau Emmeln		Rocking horse ride where guests ages 4 to 12 ride fiberglass horses that rock back and forth above a track.

=== Imagination Zone ===
In the Imagination Zone, visitors can ride a Wild Mouse-style roller coaster called the Technic Coaster-Test Track (formerly named Project X), Bionicle Blaster (a variant of a teacup ride). Kids can also build and race Lego cars down a ramp at Build 'n Test (younger children have a similar build and play area in the same building, named Duplo Play), play LEGO PC games at the Maniac Challenge (later converted to consoles and renamed the Xbox Family Gamespace after its corporate sponsor), and program robots in Mindstorms. At the park's opening in 1999, the Imagination Zone only referred to the Maniac Challenge/Mindstorms and Build & Test/Duplo Play buildings; the other rides had not yet been built. The Maniac Challenge/Mindstorms building was distinguished by large LEGO models of Albert Einstein's head, a submarine, and a Technic Tyrannosaurus rex.

The LEGO Show Place theater screens 4-D films. In the initial incarnation, the movie was interactive and the audience could decide the ending. Later, more movies were added, including Bob the Builder and Clutch Powers (a racing movie). Racers 4-D began alternating with the new Spellbreaker 4-D film in May 2006. Bob the Builder in 4-D: Bob the Builder and the Roller Coaster was added in March 2009. The Legends of Chima debuted on March 7, 2014. The LEGO Movie™ 4D A New Adventure was added to Legoland California on February 6, 2016. LEGO NINJAGO – Master of the 4th Dimension opened on January 12, 2018. LEGO City 4D – Officer in Pursuit! was added on April 12, 2019.

In February 2019, sets from The Lego Movie 2 were installed in the Imagination Zone.

Attraction	Added	Manufacturer	Image	Description
Technic Coaster	2001	Mack Rides		Wild mouse roller coaster; single-car ride with four riders per car.
Bionicle Blaster	2003	Mack		Bionicle-themed tea cups ride.
LEGO Show Place	1999			4D theater that shows seasonal movies.
LEGO City Space				Area where guests can build either a rocket or a moon rover that could "help" with NASA's Artemis mission. A LEGO model of the Space Shuttle Discovery is on display at the entrance of the room.
LEGO Mindstorms				Classes that teach children how to operate Mindstorms robots
Ferrari Build & Race	2022			A Ferrari themed room where guests can either build LEGO models of Ferrari vehicles, or build their own creation. A life-sized LEGO model of a Ferrari F40 can also be seen there.

=== Pirate Shores ===
Pirate Shores is a splash park with water-oriented rides and attractions. This area was added in 2006, and Captain Cranky's Challenge was added in May 2007.

Attraction	Added	Manufacturer	Image	Description
Captain Cranky's Challenge	2007	Zamperla		A ride with a mock pirate ship that sways in an u-shaped track and rotates bi-directionally
Pirate Reef	2012	Hopkins Rides		A "shoot the chutes" attraction with interactive components including a splash bridge, water cannons and brick building play area. This attraction is accessible from both Pirate Shores and the Legoland Water Park and only operates seasonally.
Soak n' Sail	2006	Whitewater West		The larger of the two water playgrounds.
Splash Battle	2006	Preston & Barbieri		A water ride where guests spray each other with water on-ride and off-ride; up to four passengers per boat and each seat is equipped with a water cannon.
Swabbie's Deck	2006			A small water play area for small children, developed as "Squabbies Deck".

=== Land of Adventure ===
This section is designed to replicate the 1920s in Egypt, drawing inspiration from the LEGO Adventurers line (Egypt sub-theme). Land of Adventure opened in March 2008.

Attraction	Added	Manufacturer	Image	Description
Beetle Bounce	2008	S&S Worldwide		Guests bounce nearly 15 feet (4.6 m) to nearly touch the enormous beetles above
Cargo Ace	2008	Zamperla		Guests board one of eight planes to fly six feet into the air
Dune Raiders	2009			A tall slide in which guests race each other to the bottom.
Lost Kingdom Adventure	2008	Sally		Guests board and ride a roadster to recover stolen treasure by blasting targets with laser guns along their journey. First interactive dark ride at Legoland California, designed by Bill Vollbrecht.
Pharaoh's Revenge	2008			Guests fire foam balls at targets and at each other

=== LEGO Ninjago World ===
The Lego Ninjago World opened in May 2016. The area features Ninjago: The Ride along with new retail and dining options. Ninjago: The Ride is controlled by hand motions using "Maestro" technology developed by Triotech, who had previously developed the interactive Voyage to the Iron Reef dark ride at Knott's Berry Farm. This area also features Ninjago Training Camp, a playground that opened in December 2022.

=== Retired rides and attractions ===
Attraction	Years	Area	Image	Description
Aquazone Wave Racers	2000–2021	Imagination Zone		Dual water carousel. Replaced by Ninjago Training Camp in 2022.
Enchanted Walk	2005–2018	Castle Hill		Woodland animal models built from LEGO bricks. Replaced by LEGO City: Deep Sea Adventure in 2018.
Flight Squadron	1999–2017	Fun Town		LEGO airplane-themed ride that move up and down while moving in a circle
Knight's Tournament	2005–2019	Castle Hill		Robotic arm-like ride where guests can select their level of intensity, with level one being the least intense and level five being the most intense. First Kuka RoboCoaster in the United States.
Miniland Florida	2004–11	Miniland		Florida-themed section of Miniland, including a model of the Daytona International Speedway. Replaced by Star Wars Miniland in 2011.
Sky Cruiser	1999–2018	The Ridge (Fun Town)		Pedal-powered track ride with panoramic views of the park.
Spellbreaker	2000–03	Castle Hill		Single-car with tandem riders suspended roller coaster; steel Batflyer model manufactured by Caripro. Dual tracks, maximum 5 cars per track at one time. Legoland California's shortest lived attraction
Water Works	1999–2015	Village Green (Heartlake City)		Pressure-activated musical fountain and interactive water features. Replaced by "Heartlake Fountain"
Treasure Falls	2006–16	Pirate Shores		A small log flume ride that showed "what pirates do on their vacation". Closed in 2016.
Wild Woods Golf	2005–18	Castle Hill		Miniature golf-sized course using putting greens with off-green LEGO-themed decorations. Replaced by LEGO City: Deep Sea Adventure in 2018.
Safari Trek	1999–2023	Explorer Island		Safari attraction where you see Lego Created Animals. Removed Permanently For Dino Valley in 2023
Fairy Tale Brook	1999–2023	Fairytale Brook		Boating track guests enter that shows Lego their favorite Fairy Tales. Removed Permanently for Dino Valley in 2023
Police and Fire Academy	2004-25	Fun Town		Competitive team attraction where groups propel a hand pumped truck in a race down a street, accomplish a task, and return. In the original incarnation named Fun Town Fire Academy, all vehicles were fire trucks rushing to douse a simulated building "fire". A police theme was added in 2011, and the task for the police trucks was to knock down robbers.
Sky Patrol	1999-2025	Fun Town		Lego helicopter-themed ride that moves up and down and can spin in place. Rethemed to "Launch and Land" as part of LEGO Galaxy land

== Sea Life Aquarium ==
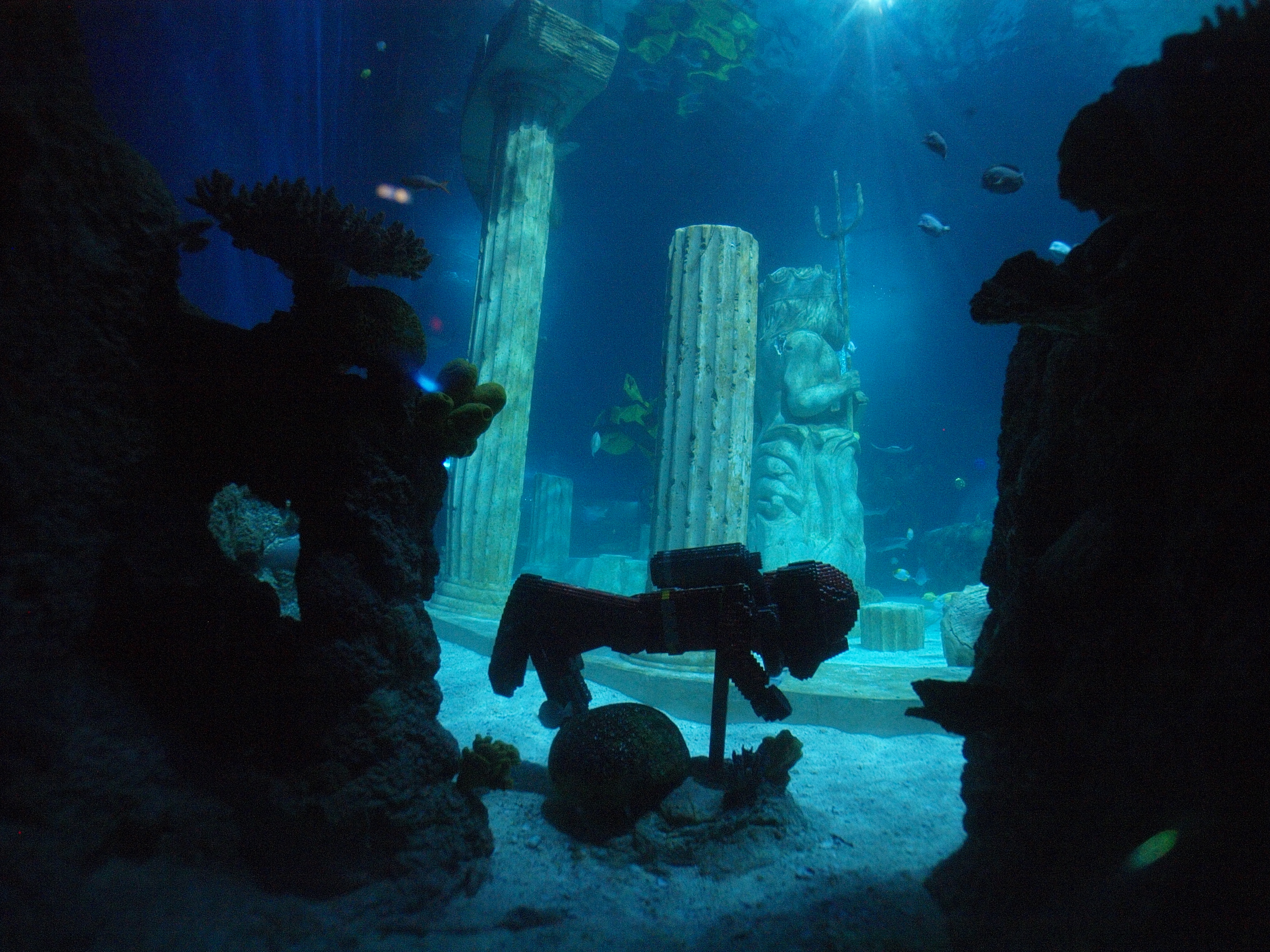
The lost city of Atlantis in the Sea Life Aquarium in Carlsbad, California

The first Sea Life Aquarium in North America opened at Legoland California in August 2008. It has 36,000 sq ft (3,300 m^{2}) of floor area on two stories, featuring a 35 ft (11 m) long acrylic walk-through tunnel and LEGO models in the tanks.

== Water Park ==
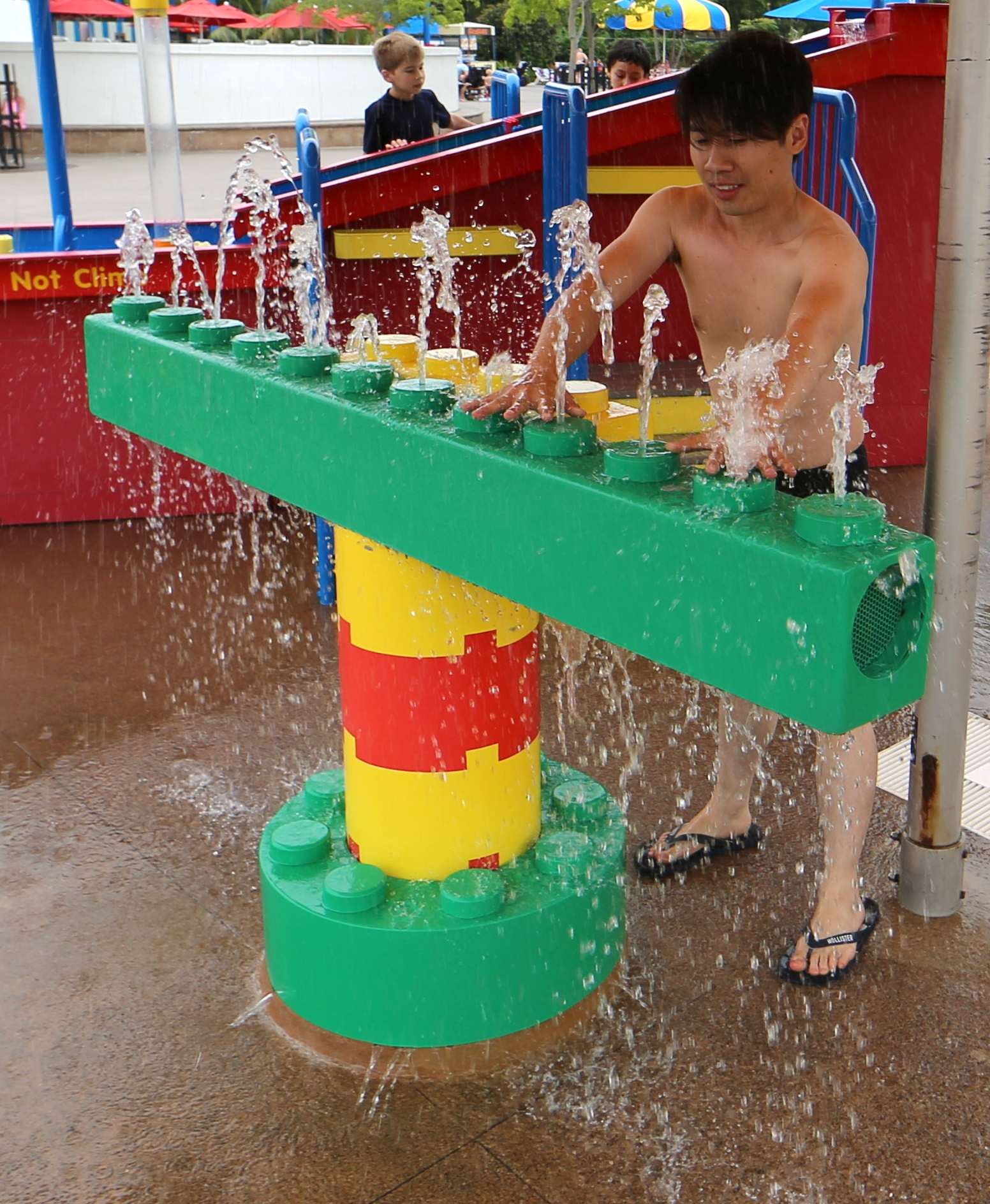
The first feature that users encounter when entering the Legoland Water Park is the Aquatune hydraulophone, an underwater pipe organ. The hydraulophone is the centerpiece of a series of interactive exhibits on either side of it that teach other elements of flow, such as water tables, and small water laboratory-like spaces where participants can explore hydraulophonic-like action (blocking water jets to create head, pressure, etc.), and also construct dams from Lego bricks.

This is a water park area in Legoland California. Planning for the water park began in September 2009, and it opened on May 28, 2010. It is located next to the buildings in Fun Town, meaning admission to the water park is an extra cost ticket in addition to regular park admission.

It is the first Legoland to feature a water park; a Legoland Water Park opened in Florida in 2012. At Legoland California, a Legends of Chima-themed expansion to the water park opened in early July 2014.

Attraction	Added	Area	Description
Build-A-Raft River	2010	LEGOLAND Water Park	Lazy river where guests can build foam LEGO bricks on their inner tube
DUPLO Splash Safari	2010	LEGOLAND Water Park	Kids area with small water slides
Imagination Station	2010	LEGOLAND Water Park	Interactive play area
Joker Soaker	2010	LEGOLAND Water Park	Tower that releases water onto the guests below
Orange Rush	2010	LEGOLAND Water Park	Large raft water slide
Splash Out	2010	LEGOLAND Water Park	Body slide
Splash Zoo	2011	LEGOLAND Water Park	Kids area
Twin Chasers	2010	LEGOLAND Water Park	Two body slides
Pirate Reef	2012	LEGOLAND Water Park	Shoot-the-chutes ride that has entrances in LEGOLAND Water Park.
Cragger's Swamp	2014	LEGO CHIMA Water Park	Interactive water playground
Eglor's Build-A-Boat	2014	LEGO CHIMA Water Park	LEGO building area where guests build small boats that they can place in a small artificial creek
Lion Temple Wave Pool	2014	LEGO CHIMA Water Park	Wave pool with a 30' Mount Cavora "floating" in the middle
Speedorz Arena	2014–2016	LEGO CHIMA Water Park	Interactive play area where guests can race their Speedorz
