= Wedgewood Village Amusement Park =

Former amusement park in Oklahoma City, Oklahoma, US

- Interactive map of Wedgewood Village Amusement Park
- Location: 63rd and N.W. Expressway, Oklahoma City, Oklahoma, U.S.
- Coordinates: 35°32′24″N 97°35′37″W
- Status: Defunct
- Opened: 1955
- Closed: 1969
- Owner: Maurice Woods

Wedgewood Village Amusement Park was an amusement park in Oklahoma City, Oklahoma. It was originally started in 1955 by Maurice Woods and located at May and NW 58th street, where it was known as Duffys Golf. Maurice started to notice that wives and children were sitting in their cars while their husbands used the driving range. Thus, the idea was to place a few kiddie rides to keep them occupied. The rides became so popular that Maurice decided to acquire the land at 63rd and N.W. Expressway where he built Wedgewood Village (named after the idea of a wedge and wood golf club). It opened in 1958 and lasted until 1969. Most of the rides were sold after the 1968 season. The park sported a number of rides, most notably the Tornado coaster.

== Tornado ==
The Tornado was a wooden roller coaster built and designed by John C. Allen and the Philadelphia Toboggan Company. The coaster was built in 1961, and enlarged from its original 58 feet (18 m) tall to 75 feet (23 m) tall for the 1962 season. After 1962, the lift hill led directly into a turn before the first drop, and a new high turn was added at the station end, with the rest of the ride maintaining its pre-expansion configuration. It was sold in 1968, and rebuilt in Panama City, Florida at Petticoat Junction Amusement Park. It operated there until September 1984 when that park closed. It was sold after that closing to a park in Ohio, where parts of it were incorporated into an existing coaster.

== Other ==
Maurice Woods died in July 2008. He was working on a Wedgewood coffee table book at the time.

The olympic regulation size pool is still in existence and the Wedgewood Apartments have now been built around it.
