= Orange County Fair (New York) =

Annual fair held in town of Wallkill, New York

The Orange County Fair is an annual fair held in the town of Wallkill, New York. The fair began when farmers of Orange County organized an agricultural society to help promote a county fair. In 1808 they tried to organize the fair but it did not generate enough local interest. The society tried again in 1818 and held the fair until 1825. It took another sixteen years before county leaders met at the Old Stone Courthouse in Goshen, New York on September 11, 1841, and formed the Orange County Agricultural Society. That meeting was the birth of the Orange County Fair and the first fair was held on November 17, 1841, in Goshen.

Since that first fair in Goshen, the fair gained in popularity and other communities wanted to host it on a rotating basis. The fair rotated locations from year to year in Montgomery, NY, Chester, NY, Newburgh, NY, Warwick, NY, Washingtonville, NY, Goshen, NY and Middletown, NY.

In 1862 the fair's permanent site in Goshen was established but by 1872 the fair was in trouble because the lease on that site was not renewed, however, a group of Orange County farmers kept the fair alive in succeeding years.

It was permanently located in the Wallkill–Middletown area in 1897.

The fair was cancelled during WWI from 1917 to 1918, WWII 1942–45 and during the COVID-19 pandemic in 2020.

== Orange County Fair Speedway ==
The fairgrounds are also home to the Orange County Fair Speedway, where they hold stock car races and demolition derbies during the summer months. It is the oldest continuously operating dirt track in the United States. In 1919, a group staged an automobile race during the annual fair. The first race was a huge success, and auto racing has been an integral part of the fairgrounds ever since.

== 4-H And Future Farmers of America ==
The fair no longer maintains 4-H and Future Farmers of America exhibits, Future Farmers of America hasn't been a part of the fair for a number of years and in 2012, 4-H pulled out as well. The fair now brings in private agricultural displays and exotic animals which it considers more friendly to its customers.

== Westwood One / Pepsi Concert Series ==
In the 1980s and 1990s, each summer, the Orange County Fairgrounds hosted the Westwood One & Pepsi Concert Series, featuring some of the biggest names in the rock & pop music industry. Some of the music acts included:

| Artist / Band | Tour | Date |
|---|---|---|
| Jan & Dean | Reunion Tour | July 24, 1981 |
| The Beach Boys | | August 28, 1983 |
| Aerosmith with Orion the Hunter (band) | Back in the Saddle Tour | July 5, 1984 |
| 38 Special w/ special guest Night Ranger | Tour de Force Tour | July 30, 1984 |
| Stray Cats | Rant n' Rave w/ the Stray Cats Tour | July 31, 1984 |
| Crosby, Stills & Nash | CSN Summer Tour | August 10, 1984 |
| Huey Lewis and The News | Sports Tour | August 24, 1984 |
| Santana (band) | Beyond Appearances Tour | June 30, 1985 |
| Huey Lewis and The News | Sports Tour - "Power Of Love" Segment | July 18, 1985 |
| Willie Nelson | Willie Nelson & Family LIVE! | July 30, 1985 |
| Foreigner w/ special guest Joe Walsh | Juke Box Heroes Tour | August 1, 1985 |
| Bryan Adams w/ special guest Cock Robin (band) | Reckless Tour | August 27, 1985 |
| Rick Springfield w/ special guest Til' Tuesday | Cathode Ray Tour / Voices Carry Tour | September 1, 1985 |
| Jackson Browne | Lives In The Balance Tour | July 6, 1986 |
| Alabama w/ special guest Sawyer Brown | The Touch Tour | July 23, 1986 |
| The Monkees with Herman's Hermits & Gary Puckett & The Union Gap | 20th Anniversary Reunion Tour | July 24, 1986 |
| Loverboy with special guest Dokken | Lovin Every Minute Of It Tour | July 31, 1986 |
| Stevie Nicks w/ special guest Peter Frampton | The Rock A Little Tour | August 17, 1986 |
| John Fogerty | Rockin' All Over the World Tour | September 9, 1986 |
| Tom Petty and The Heartbreakers w/ Georgia Satellites & Del Fuegos | Rock 'N' Roll Caravan '87 Tour | July 11, 1987 |
| Bryan Adams with Special Guest The Hooters | Into The Fire Tour | June 15, 1987 |
| Heart (band) with Tom Kimmel | Bad Animals Tour | July 23, 1987 |
| Kenny Rogers w/ special guest Ronnie Milsap | Kenny Rogers 10th Anniversary Tour | August 28, 1987 |
| Huey Lewis & The News w/ special guest Bonnie Hayes & the Wild Combo | FORE! Tour | August 30, 1987 |
| Heart w/ special guest Michael Bolton | Bad Animals Tour II | June 26, 1988 |
| Def Leppard w/ special guest Europe (band) | Hysteria Tour | July 26, 1988 |
| Judas Priest w/ special guest Cinderella (band) | Mercenaries of Metal Tour | July 27, 1988 |
| Whitesnake | Slip of the Tongue Tour | August 5, 1988 |
| Aerosmith w/ special guest Guns N' Roses | Permanent Vacation Tour / Appetite For Destruction Tour | August 7, 1988 |
| INXS w/ Jimmy Barnes | Calling All Nations Tour | August 19, 1988 |
| Bob Dylan | Never Ending Tour | September 2, 1988 |
| Poison (band) w/ special guest Tesla | Open Up And Say...Ahh! Tour | June 2, 1989 |
| Ozzy Osbourne w/ special guests White Lion and Vixen (band) | No Rest For The Wicked Tour | July 2, 1989 |
| Bon Jovi w/ Skid Row | New Jersey Syndicate Tour | July 9, 1989 |
| Metallica w/ The Cult | Damaged Justice Tour / Sonic Temple Tour | July 14, 1989 |
| The Beach Boys w/ special guest Chicago (band) | Endless Summer Tour / Beachago Tour 1989 | July 25, 1989 |
| Yes (band) | An Evening of Yes Music Plus Tour | August 9, 1989 |
| Tom Petty w/ special guest The Replacements | Strange Behavior Tour | August 18, 1989 |
| The B-52's | Cosmic Tour | June 15, 1990 |
| Kiss w/ special guest Slaughter | Hot In The Shade Tour | June 17, 1990 |
| Aerosmith w/ special guest The Black Crowes | Pump Tour / Shake Your Money Maker Tour | June 19, 1990 |
| Mötley Crüe w/ special guest Tesla | Dr. Feelgood World Tour / Five Man Acoustical Jam Tour | July 1, 1990 |
| Whitesnake w/ Faster Pussycat | Liquor & Poker World Tour | July 6, 1990 |
| Heart w/ Giant (band) | The Brigade Tour | July 18, 1990 |
| Crosby, Stills & Nash | Tour: Live It Up | July 23, 1990 |
| Poison with Slaughter & Bullet Boys | Swallow This Live: Flesh & Blood World Tour | June 5, 1991 |
| Megadeth / Slayer / Anthrax / Alice In Chains | Clash Of The Titans Tour | June 27, 1991 |
| Doobie Brothers | American Tour | July 4, 1991 |
| David Lee Roth w/ Cinderella & Extreme | Little Ain't Enough Tour | July 5, 1991 |
| Yes | Union Tour | July 22, 1991 |
| Huey Lewis and the News | Hard At Play Tour | July 24, 1991 |
| The Scorpions w/ Great White, Aldo Nova, & Mr. Big | Crazy World Tour | July 25, 1991 |
| Judas Priest with Alice Cooper, Metal Church & Dangerous Toys | Operation Rock N' Roll Tour | August 16, 1991 |
| Bad Company w/ special guest Damn Yankees | Holy Water Summer Tour | September 2, 1991 |
| ZZ Topp with Extreme | Recycler Tour / Pornograffiti Tour | September 11, 1991 |
| Steve Miller Band w/ Curtis Salgado | The Lost Cities Tour | August 7, 1992 |
| The Allman Brother w/ special guest Jeff Healey Band | Shades of Two Worlds Tour / FEEL THIS | August 28, 1992 |
| Tesla | Psychotic Supper World Tour | September 20, 1992 |
| Van Halen w/ special guest Vince Neil Band | Right Here, Right Now Tour | July 6, 1993 |
| Soul Asylum / Spin Doctors / Screaming Trees | MTV Alternative Nation Tour | July 15, 1993 |
| Phish w/ Blues Traveler & Widespread Panic | 1993 SUMMER TOUR / HORDE Tour | July 21, 1993 |
| Def Leppard w/ special guest Ugly Kid Joe | Adrenalize Tour | July 30, 1993 |
| Metallica / Danzig / Suicidal Tendencies | Shit Hits The Shed Tour | June 17, 1994 |
| Scorpions | Face the Heat Tour | July 6, 1994 |
| Michael Bolton w/ special guest Celine Dion | The Color of My Love Tour | August 4, 1994 |
| Yes | Talk Tour | August 21, 1994 |
| Queensrÿche w/ Type O Negative | The Road To The Promised Land Tour | July 25, 1995 |
| 101.5 WPDH 20th Anniversary $20,000 Cash Bash | with Special Guest .38 SPECIAL | June 28, 1996 |
| Def Leppard | Slang Tour | July 19, 1996 |
| Cypress Hill & Fugees | Smokin' Grooves Tour | August 6, 1996 |
| Iggy Pop w/ Sponge (band) & Bloodhound Gang | Naughty Little Doggie Tour | June 20, 1997 |
| Stephen Lynch | | July 21, 1997 |
| Boyz II Men | Evolution Tour | July 6, 1998 |
| Goo Goo Dolls with Sugar Ray | Dizzy Up the Girl Tour | Aug. 29, 1999 |
| The Marshall Tucker Band | | July 25, 2001 |
| Survivor | | Friday July 23, 2004 8PM (PEPSI portable stage) |
| Buddy Jewell | | July 24, 2004 (PEPSI portable stage) |
| Mountain / Vanilla Fudge / Canned Heat | Then & Now Tour | July 27, 2004 |
| Josh Turner | Long Black Train Tour | July 28, 2004 |
| Vital Remains w/ Immolation | Death In The Forest Festival 2006 | May 20, 2006 |
| 3 (band) | The End Is Begun Tour | July 19, 2008 |
| Graham Parker | | October 11, 2008 |
| Night Ranger w/ Vince Neil | 35th Anniversary Tour | July 18, 2018 |
| The Iron Maidens | | Aug 6, 2021 |
