= Untamed (Canobie Lake Park) =

Steel Euro-Fighter roller coaster at Canobie Lake Park in New Hampshire

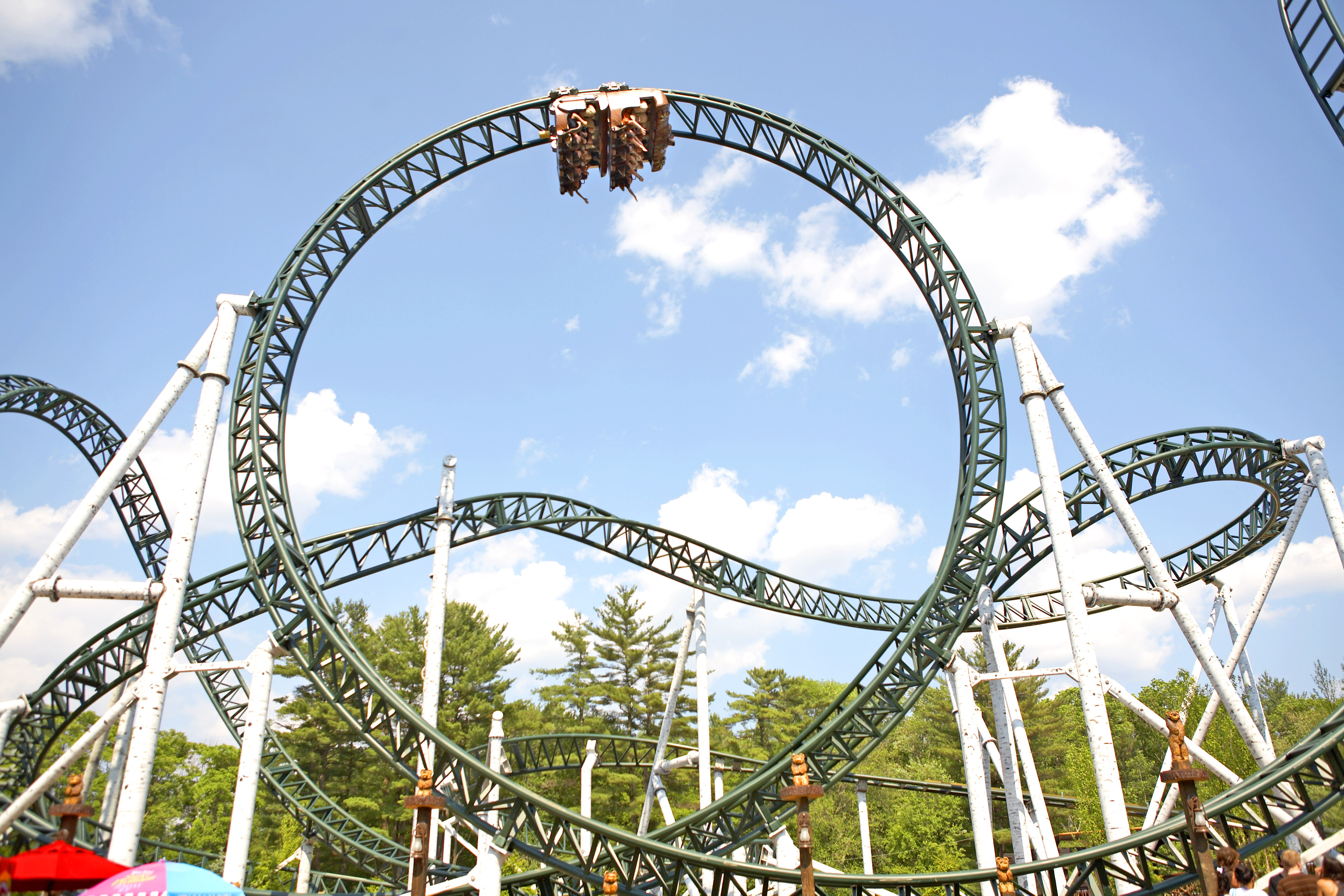

Canobie Lake Park
- Location: Canobie Lake Park
- Coordinates: 42.7962°N 71.2490°W
- Status: Operating
- Opening date: June 11, 2011

General statistics
- Type: Steel – Euro-Fighter
- Manufacturer: Gerstlauer
- Model: Euro-Fighter
- Track layout: 320+
- Lift/launch system: Chain lift hill
- Height: 72 ft (22 m)
- Length: 1,184 ft (361 m)
- Speed: 44 mph (71 km/h)
- Inversions: 3
- Duration: 0:51
- Max vertical angle: 97°
- Capacity: 850 riders per hour
- G-force: 4.5
- Height restriction: 48 in (122 cm)
- Untamed at RCDB

Untamed is a steel Euro-Fighter roller coaster located at Canobie Lake Park in Salem, New Hampshire.

== Layout ==
The ride is a Gerstlauer Euro-Fighter, 320+ model. The ride was installed by Ride Entertainment Group, who handles all of Gerstlauer's operations in the Western Hemisphere. A 90° vertical lift hill is followed by a 72-foot (22 m), 97° beyond-vertical drop. After the drop the 8 person cars go through three inversions: a large vertical loop, a cutback and a heartline roll. The ride has a forest and wilderness theme with the supports for the ride made to look like white birch trees (the state tree of New Hampshire) and the track painted dark green. The coaster layout for Untamed is particularly close to two other Euro-Fighter (model 320+) roller coasters: Rage at Adventure Island and Falcon at Duinrell.

== Impact ==
Untamed is Canobie Lake Park's second steel roller coaster, which brought the park's total number of coasters to three at its time of opening. With the closure and removal of Canobie Corkscrew in 2022, Untamed now stands as Canobie Lake Park's only steel roller coaster and their second fully operational full-size roller coaster in the park. There had not been a new roller coaster at Canobie Lake besides Untamed since the Dragon Coaster was added in 1991. Untamed is located near the park's oldest coaster, the Yankee Cannonball, and was built on top of an old field used for functions. Part of the Jackpot Casino was turned into the queue. The old spaceship was also moved to a storage area behind the park to make room for the ride.

== Similar rides ==
- Rage in Adventure Island
- Falcon in Duinrell
- Mystery Mine in Dollywood
- SAW – The Ride in Thorpe Park
- SpongeBob SquarePants Rock Bottom Plunge at Nickelodeon Universe

== See also ==
- 2011 in amusement parks
