= North Salem, New Hampshire =

Unincorporated community in New Hampshire, United States

- Unincorporated community
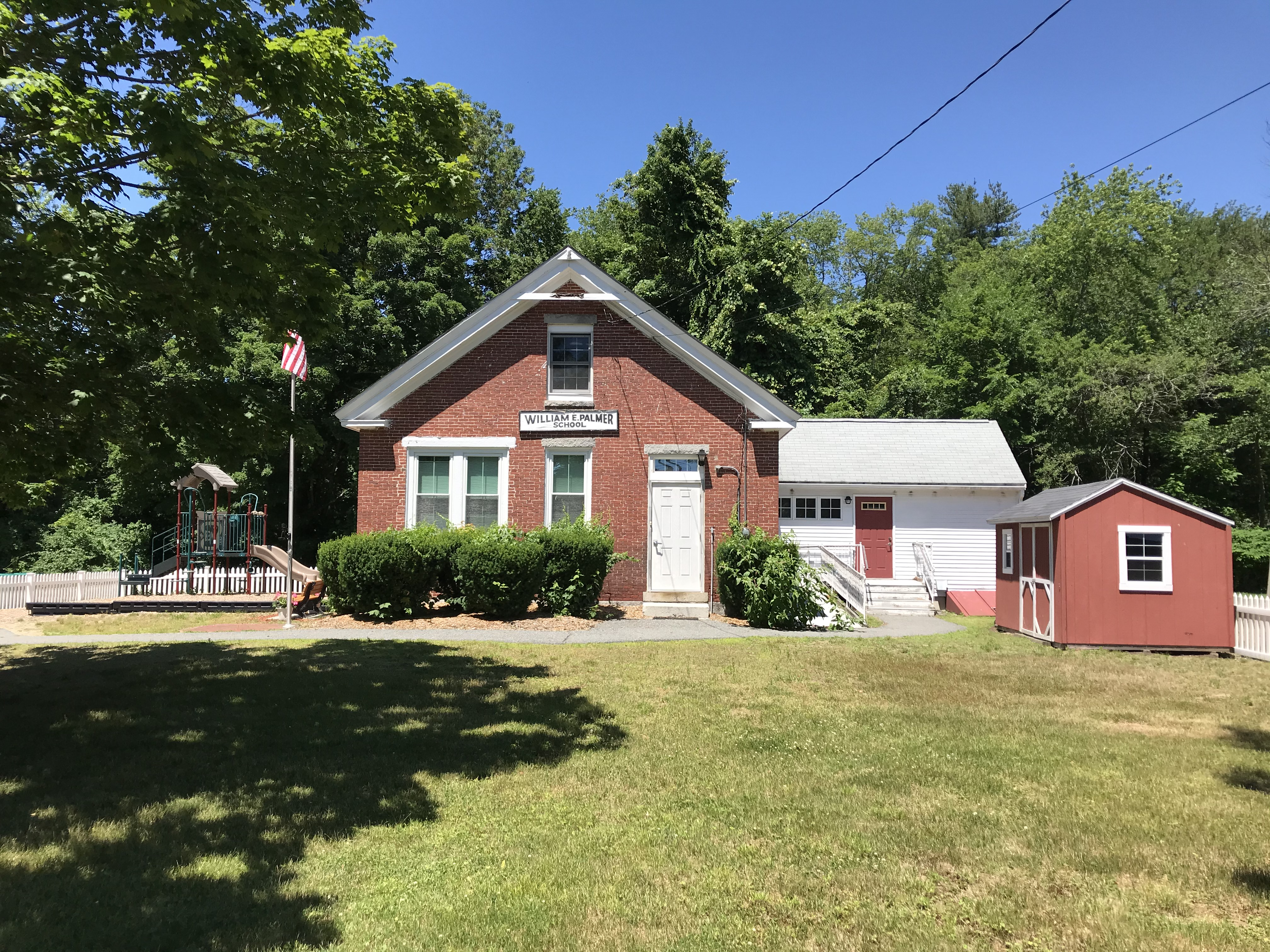
- William E Palmer School

- Location within New Hampshire Location within the United States
- Coordinates: 42°50′13″N 71°13′14″W
- Country: United States
- State: New Hampshire
- County: Rockingham
- Town: Salem
- Elevation: 187 ft (57 m)
- Time zone: UTC-5 (Eastern (EST))
  - Summer (DST): UTC-4 (EDT)
- ZIP code: 03073
- Area code: 603
- GNIS feature ID: 868812

North Salem is a section of the town of Salem in Rockingham County, New Hampshire, United States. It occupies the northernmost portion of the town and is located at the northern end of Arlington Mill Reservoir. Although there are some shops and other businesses, it is mostly a residential area.

The community is bypassed by New Hampshire Route 111, which travels northeast to Hampstead and Kingston, and southwest to Windham and Hudson.

North Salem has a separate ZIP code (03073, P.O. boxes only) from other areas in the town of Salem.

== Site of interest ==
- America's Stonehenge, located just east of the center of North Salem
