= Mystery Hill =

Mystery hill is another name for a gravity hill, a type of optical illusion created by surrounding landscape.

Mystery hill may also refer to:

- Mystery Hill, a family entertainment complex in Blowing Rock, North Carolina
- America's Stonehenge, an archaeological site in Salem, New Hampshire in the northeastern United States, known as Mystery Hill until 1982
- Mystery Hill, a tourist attraction in Irish Hills outside Brooklyn, Michigan
