= Manchester and Lawrence Railroad =

Locomotive in new hampshire, USA

Map

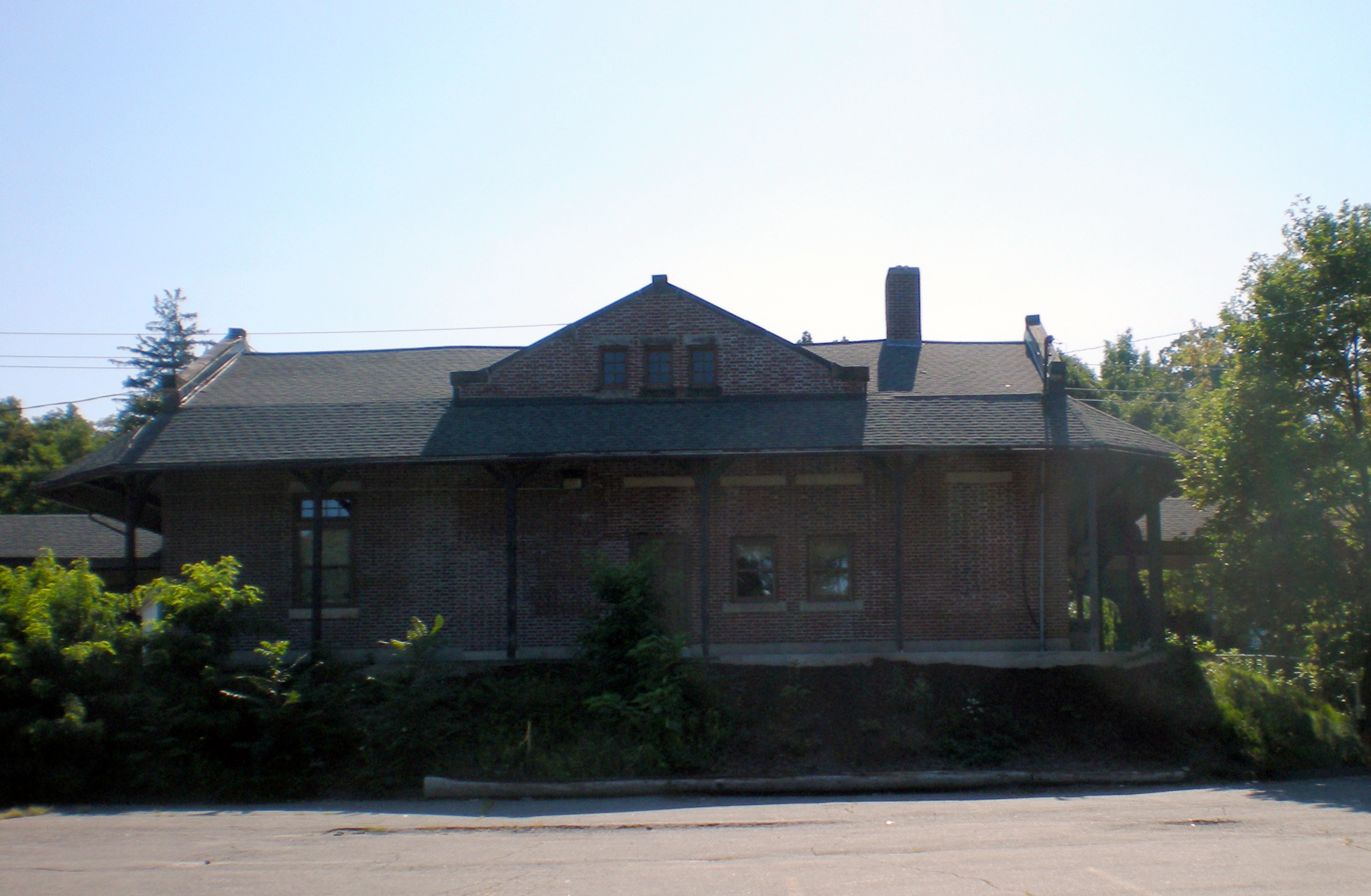
Methuen Train Depot

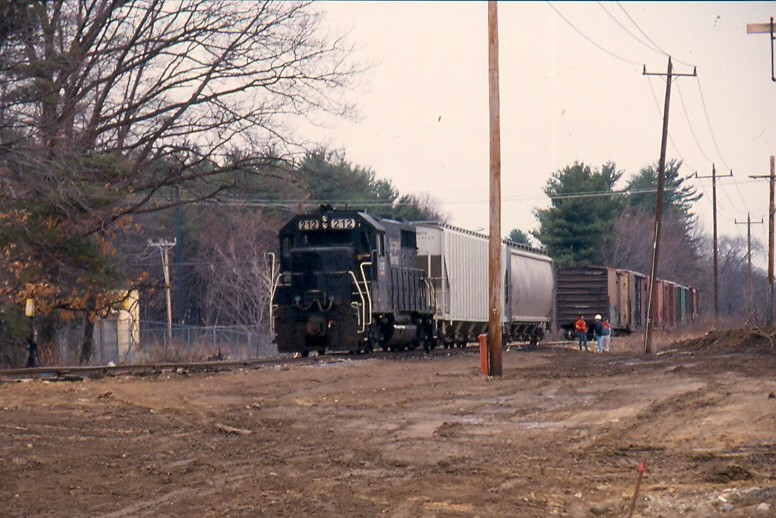
Guilford switcher on the M&L in Salem, New Hampshire, c. 1993

The Manchester and Lawrence Railroad (M&L) was a railroad company that was chartered in New Hampshire, United States, by businessmen from Manchester, to build a rail line from that city to the Massachusetts state line.

== History ==
The Manchester and Lawrence (M&L) was chartered in 1847 and opened in November 1849. It leased the newly built Methuen Branch from the Boston and Maine Railroad (B&M) which opened in August 1849 and ran from South Lawrence through Methuen to the state line where the two railroad lines met.

The B&M tried to lease the M&L, but the company leased itself to the Concord Railroad in 1850. This still helped the B&M as the railroad opened up a second Manchester to Boston route that helped the B&M compete with the combined Nashua and Lowell and Boston and Lowell Railroads. Within 1887, the contract was terminated, and the B&M gained control of the line.

In the 20th century, the line was relegated to local freight. Passenger service on the line dropped to one round trip per day until 1953 when regular passenger service ended. Special summer trains ran to Rockingham Park in Salem for the horse races until 1960 when that service stopped.

Despite rapid population growth in Rockingham County in the 1960s and '70s, rail traffic declined. On November 6, 1980, the section of the line from North Salem to Derry was temporarily taken out of service and later abandoned in 1984 by Guilford, having never been reactivated. In 1986, the line from Derry to Londonderry (Manchester Airport) was abandoned. Freight service between the Manchester railyard and the airport continued until 1989, when a severe washout crippled the railbed just north of Goffs Falls Road in South Manchester. Guilford continued to serve the remaining customers from the railyard to South Manchester until 1998. The entire remaining right-of-way from the railyard to Manchester Airport was abandoned in 2000, and the segment that ran through the airport was sold to extend one of the runways.

Freight continued to run on the southern end of the line from Lawrence to North Salem until December 1992, when the remaining customers in that part of town closed. Service from Lawrence to the Rockingham Park run-around siding in Salem continued until March 1999. The main line and passing track at the racetrack were removed immediately and relocated south so that Guilford could continue to serve the last remaining customer while waiting for approval to abandon service from the Surface Transportation Board. All service north of the Lawrence city line ended in June 2001 when Guilford delivered two covered hoppers to leave behind in Salem and picked up empties. A small stretch in Lawrence continued to see infrequent service until 2014. The portion of the line in Massachusetts (Lawrence and Methuen) is currently owned by the Massachusetts Bay Transit Authority (MBTA), and all track north of Lawrence has been removed, with some sections of rail still in place in Londonderry (just south of the airport) and staggered spots in Manchester.

The New Hampshire state rail plan of 2012 and the I-93 transit study stated that it could be feasible to revitalize the line up to Manchester for freight and commuter rail service.

== Rail trails ==
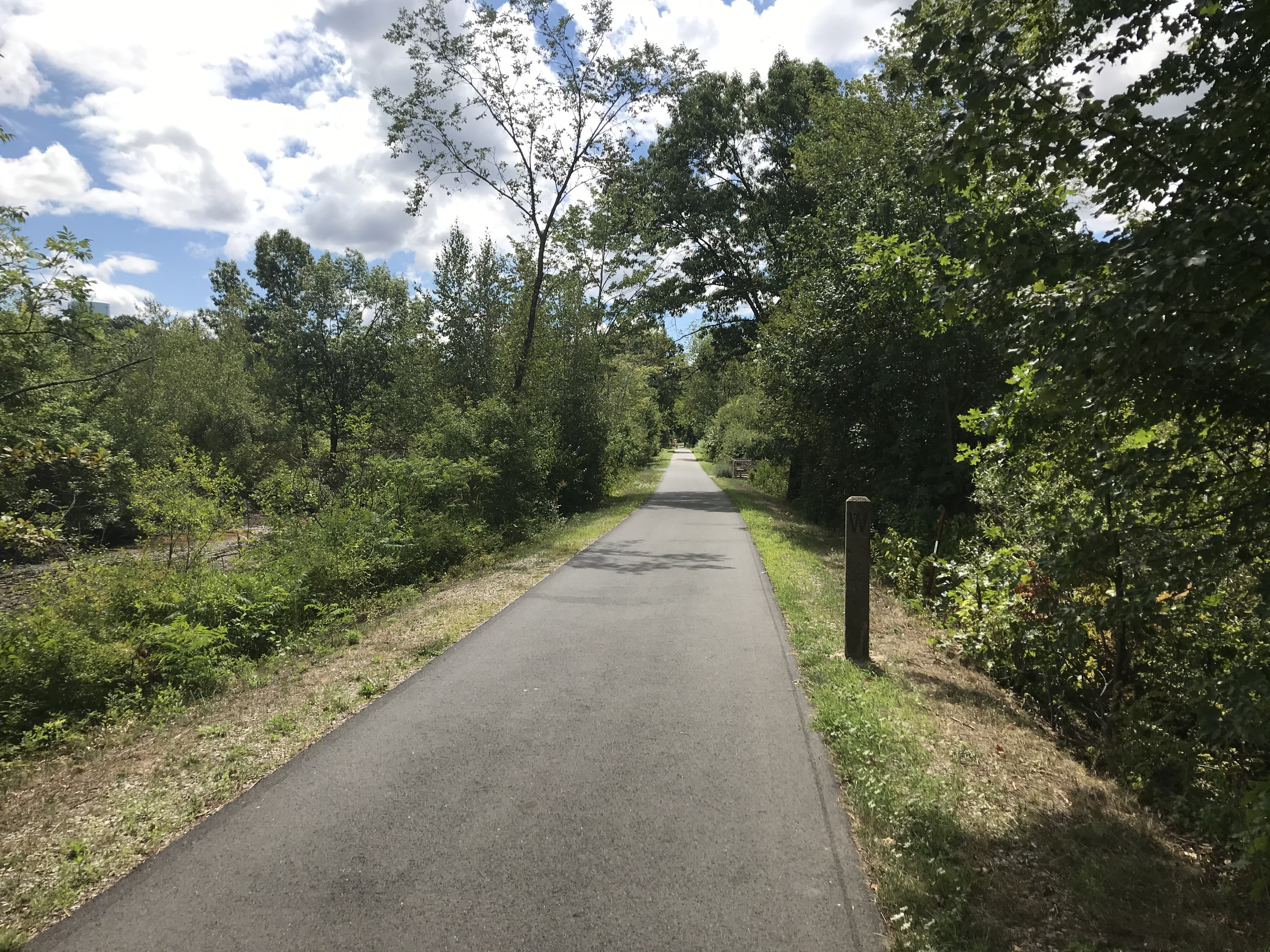
The Salem Bike/Ped Corridor in 2022

Much of the abandoned line has been converted to rail trails:

- In Manchester, the South Manchester Rail Trail was completed from Beech Street to Gold Street around 2007, with an extension to Perimeter Road opened in 2024. Extensions are planned north to downtown Manchester (as the Center Manchester Rail Trail) and south to the city line (including a section following streets around the Manchester Airport).
- In Londonderry, construction on the Londonderry Rail Trail began in 2013. By 2021, 4.5 miles (7.2 km) of the 6.2 miles (10.0 km) within the town was paved – between Harvey Road and Rockingham Road – with the remainder planned.
- In Derry, the Derry Rail Trail was built in three segments – the latter two in 2009 and 2011. By 2021, only the northernmost section of the 4 miles (6.4 km) in the town was not completed. That section was originally to include a tunnel under a new I-93 access road, but the design was controversially changed to have a crosswalk instead.
- In Windham, the Windham Rail Trail was completed from the town line south to Roulston Road in 2006, and to the Salem line in 2016.
- In Salem, the northern portions of the Salem Bike/Ped Trail opened in 2016 and 2018, with the remaining portion of the 5.2-mile (8.4 km) corridor planned.
- In Methuen, the 2.4-mile (3.9 km) Methuen Rail Trail opened in 2019.
- In Lawrence, 1.5 miles (2.4 km) Lawrence Manchester Rail Corridor from the city line to Merrimack Street is planned for completion in 2028. A $39 million construction contract was awarded in February 2025, and began construction in August 2025.
