= Canobie Lake Park =

Amusement park in Salem, New Hampshire

- Interactive map of Canobie Lake Park
- Location: Salem, New Hampshire, United States
- Coordinates: 42°47′42″N 71°15′01″W
- Opened: August 23, 1902
- Owner: Three families
- Slogan: "Just for FUN!"
- Operating season: May through October
- Area: 59 acres (24 ha)

Attractions
- Total: 53
- Roller coasters: 4
- Water rides: 6
- Website: canobie.com

Canobie Lake Park is an amusement park in Salem, New Hampshire, United States. It was founded as a trolley park on the shore of Canobie Lake in 1902. It is one of only thirteen trolley parks left in operation. The park is owned and operated by three families.

The park originally featured botanical gardens and a few amusement rides. After the automobile became the most popular mode of travel in the United States, the trolley line serving the park was closed. Attendance in the park declined, resulting in the closure of the park in 1929. It was purchased at auction by Patrick J. Holland in 1931, and reopened in 1932. He oversaw the installation of a wooden roller coaster named Yankee Cannonball in 1936. The park recovered, and has seen the installation of many rides since, including Untamed and the former Canobie Corkscrew.

== History ==
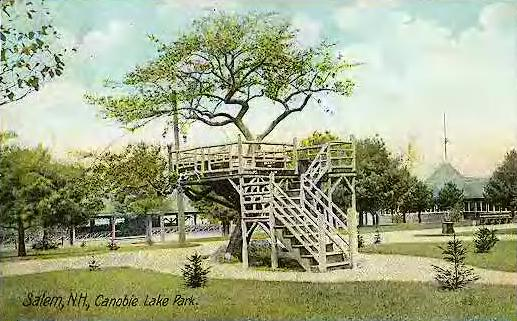
A 1908 postcard of an apple tree in the park

Canobie Lake Park opened on August 23, 1902, as a trolley park owned by the Massachusetts Northeast Street Railway Company. In its earlier years, the park was known for its flower gardens, promenades, and gentle attractions. After the decline of trolley as a mode of travel, the park declined in popularity, culminating in its closure on St. Patrick's Day in 1929.

In 1931, the park was auctioned off with the intent to subdivide the land into residential lots. Patrick J. Holland, a construction contractor from Ireland, bought the property for $17,000. He and his workers restored the park with new gardens, attractions, and modern electricity. In 1932, the park reopened, three years after its initial closure.

In 1936, the Greyhound roller coaster was installed, having been relocated from Lakewood Park in Connecticut. Holland died in 1943, leaving the park to his wife and son, who continued to operate the park until 1958. Three close friends from New Jersey purchased the park in 1958, and their families still operate the park today.

Some films and novels have used Canobie Lake Park as a setting or filming location. Stephen King, a horror novelist, based the amusement park in his novel Joyland on Canobie Lake Park. During a visit in 2012, King took photographs inside the dark ride attraction Mine of Lost Souls because he wanted to incorporate a haunted dark ride into his novel. The park was also used as a filming location for the 2013 film Labor Day, based on the novel of the same name by Joyce Maynard. It also appeared in an episode of Fetch! with Ruff Ruffman, as well as in the season six opening for the show Zoom.

== Events ==
Canobie Lake Park holds many events in the park throughout the year, including live performances and fireworks shows. The park has multiple venues for live entertainment, including the Country Stage, Midway Stage, and Dancehall Theater. The park's Dancehall Theater has hosted performers such as Duke Ellington, Sonny & Cher, Frank Sinatra, and Ella Fitzgerald. The park also hosts shows from impersonators of celebrities.

Beginning in 2008, Canobie Lake Park holds a Halloween event called ScrEEEmfest in the fall. Attractions include haunted houses, live shows, and kid-friendly activities.

== Current attractions ==
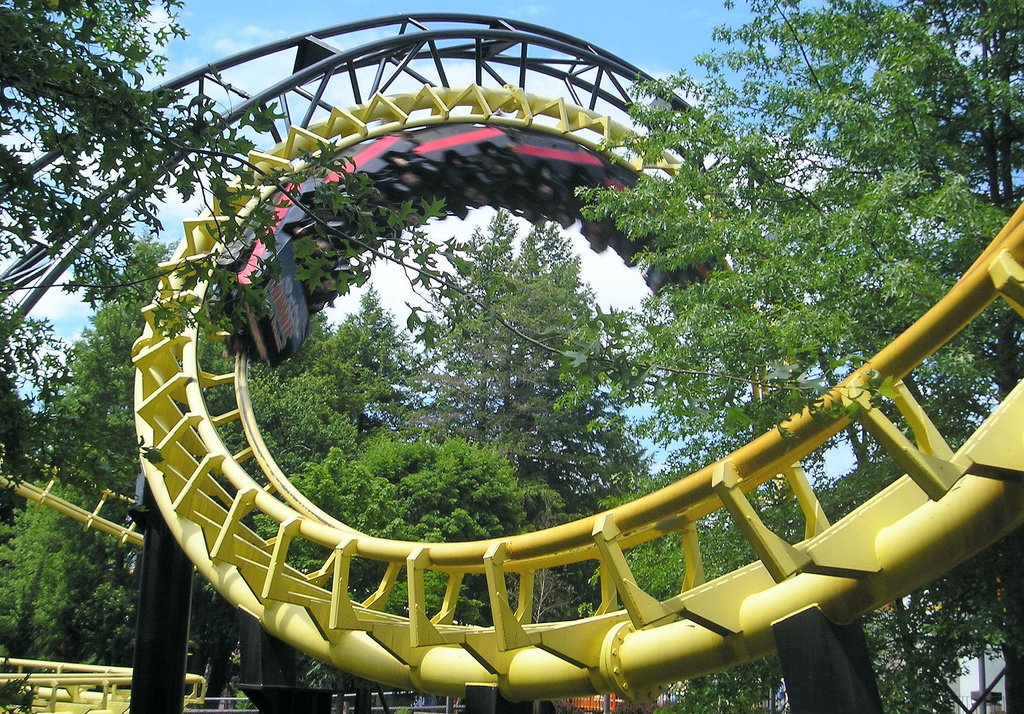
Canobie Corkscrew in 2007

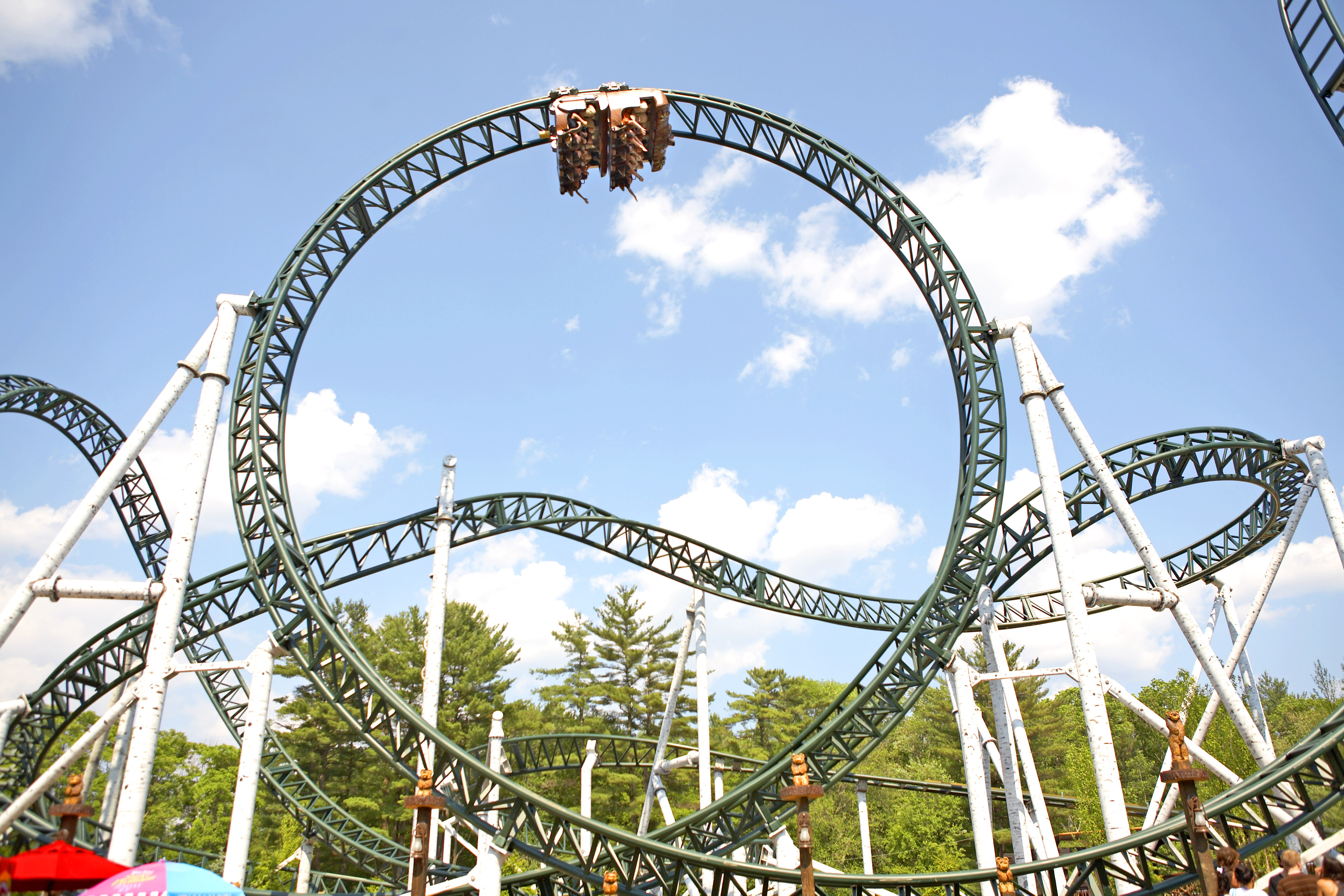
Untamed in 2013

=== Roller coasters ===
Name	Opened	Manufacturer	Type	Notes
Red Fox Run	2027	SBF Visa Group	Steel children's spinning coaster	Was in storage at the park as early as 2025
Dragon Coaster	1991	Zamperla	Steel children's coaster	
Untamed	2011	Gerstlauer	Steel Euro-Fighter roller coaster	
Yankee Cannonball	1936	Philadelphia Toboggan Coasters	Wooden out-and-back roller coaster	Originally opened at Lakewood Park in 1930 as Roller Coaster and later as Meteor. Closed in 1932, and moved to Canobie Lake Park in 1936, where it reopened as Greyhound. Renamed to Yankee Cannonball in 1983. Recognized as an ACE Roller Coaster Landmark.

=== Thrill rides ===
Name	Opened	Manufacturer	Type
Pirate	1986	S.D.C./Amusement Technical	Swinging ship
Psychodrome	1989	Eli Bridge Company	Scrambler
Starblaster	2002	S&S Power	Double Shot launch/drop tower
Time Winder	2024	Zamperla	NebulaZ
Turkish Twist	1979	S.D.C.	Rotor
Wipeout	2004	Chance Rides	Wipeout
Xtreme Frisbee	2007	HUSS Park Attractions	Frisbee

=== Family rides ===
Name	Opened	Manufacturer	Type
Antique Carousel	1902	Charles I. D. Looff/Dentzel Carousel Company/Stein & Goldstein	Carousel with Wurlitzer style 153 band organ
Antique Cars	1968	Arrow Development	Car ride
Blue Heron	2005	Unknown	Boat ride on Canobie Lake
Boston Harbor Patrol	2008	Sartori Amusement Rides	Flying carpet
Canobie 500	1977	Arrow Development	Car ride
Canobie Express	1975	Crown Metal Products	Rideable miniature railway
Caterpillar	1963	Traver Engineering	Caterpillar
Crazy Cups	1958	Philadelphia Toboggan Coasters	Teacups
DaVinci's Dream	2003	Wooddesign Amusement Rides B.V.	Swing ride
Dodgem	1930s	Unknown	Bumper cars
Giant Sky Wheel	1981	Preston & Barbieri/S.D.C.	Ferris wheel
Ice Jet	2017	Bertazzon	Matterhorn
Mine of Lost Souls	1987	S.D.C./Sally Corporation	Dark ride
Over the Rainbow	2001	Zamperla	Balloon Race
Rowdy Roosters	1948	Bisch-Rocco	Flying Scooters
Skater	2005	Zamperla	Disk'O
Sky Ride	1969	SkyTrans	Sky ride
Twist & Shout	1949	Sellner Manufacturing	Tilt-A-Whirl
Venetian Carousel	2019	Bertazzon	Double-decker Venetian carousel
Wave Blaster	2009	Zamperla	Kang'A'Bounce
Zero Gravity	2008	Battech Enterprises	Round Up

=== Water rides ===
Name	Opened	Manufacturer	Type
Blue Heron	2005	Unknown	Boat ride on Canobie Lake
Boston Tea Party	1998	Hopkins Rides	Shoot the chute
Policy Pond Log Flume	1983	Hopkins Rides	Log flume

=== Castaway Island ===
Name	Opened	Manufacturer	Type
Anaconda	2018	Aquatic Development Group	Raft slide
Constrictor	2018	Aquatic Development Group	Raft slide
Lil Squirts Play Pad	2018	Aquatic Development Group	Water play area
Python	2018	Aquatic Development Group	Raft slide
Rain Fortress	2005	WhiteWater West	Water play area with several small slides
Tidal River	2018	Aquatic Development Group	Combination lazy river and wave pool

=== Children's rides ===
Name	Opened	Type
Alpine Swings	2003	Miniature swing ride
Autobahn	2009	Spinning vehicle ride
Boats	1954	Spinning boat ride
Fire Engines	1954	Spinning fire engine ride
Flower Power	1994	Miniature The Whip
Helicopters	1959	Spinning helicopter ride
Jeeps	1953	Spinning Jeep ride
Jump Around	2009	Spinning vehicle ride
Jungle Bounce	2003	Miniature drop tower
Junior Sportscars	1958	Miniature car ride
Kiddie Canoes	Late 1980s	Miniature boat ride
Kiddie Carousel	1954	Children's carousel
Mini Dinos	1960	Spinning dinosaur ride
Mini Skooter	Late 1980s	Miniature bumper cars
Pony Carts	1954	Spinning pony ride
Sea/Land Rescue	1989	Spinning plane ride
Sky Fighters	1954	Spinning plane ride
Tanks	1954	Spinning tank ride

== Former attractions ==
=== Roller coasters ===
Name	Year opened	Year closed	Manufacturer	Type	Notes
Canobie Corkscrew	1987	2021	Arrow Development	Steel roller coaster	Originally operated at Old Chicago from 1975 to 1980 as Chicago Loop, before moving to the Alabama State Fairgrounds as Corkscrew from 1982 to 1986. Closed due to maintenance costs.
Jr. Roller Coaster	1970	1984	Allan Herschell Company	Steel children's roller coaster	
Mammoth Roller Coaster	1902	Between 1933 and 1935	Frederick Ingersoll	Side friction wooden roller coaster	Sometimes referred to as Figure 8
Rockin' Rider	1970	2004	S.D.C.	Steel Galaxi roller coaster	
Wild Mouse	1962 or earlier		B. A. Schiff & Associates	Hybrid steel wild mouse roller coaster	

=== Attractions ===
Name	Year opened	Year closed	Manufacturer	Notes
Bowling alley	1902	1960s	Unknown	After purchasing the park in the 1960s, the owners burned all the pins from the bowling alley to keep warm during their first winter
Calypso	1975	1988	Mack Rides	Replaced with the Moon Orbiter
Equinox	2012	2014	KMG	Removed due to mechanical issues.
Fascination	1930s	2001	Unknown	Replaced with the Jackpot Casino
House of Seven Gables	1938	1978	Unknown	Walkthrough dark attraction
Kosmojets	1967	2003	S.D.C.	Replaced with Wipeout
Matterhorn	1987	2006	S.D.C.	
Moon Orbiter	1989	2002	Unknown	Replaced with Star Blaster
Ocean Trip	2001	2008	SBF Visa Group	Replaced with Boston Harbor Patrol
Paratroopers	1974	2006	Unknown	Replaced with Skater
Petting zoo	Unknown	Unknown	N/A	
Round Up	Late 1950s	2007	Unknown	Replaced with Zero Gravity
Roller skating rink	1930s	1978	N/A	Building later housed ScrEEEmfest haunts
The Swamp	1930s	1985	Pretzel Amusement Ride Company	Dark ride
Swimming pool	1912	2007	Unknown	Removed to make way for a larger park entrance
Tiki-Maze	1965	2016	S.D.C.	
USA Missile	1971	2011	Unknown	A simulation ride. Removed to make way for Untamed.
Vertigo Theatre	1987	2009	Unknown	Removed to make way for "Wave Blaster"
The Whip	Mid-1950s	Early 1980s	Unknown	Removed due to difficulty in maintenance
Tall Timber Splash	1994	2023	WhiteWater West	A water coaster

== Incidents ==
- On July 27, 2001, two trains collided at the base of Yankee Cannonball's lift hill, injuring five people. The incident was blamed on operator failure to engage the ride's brakes.
- On July 1, 2014, five individuals attacked police officers after they were told they could not carry weapons in the park. Three of the five were charged with felony rioting.
- On August 6, 2016, a stuntman rolled off of a safety net and fell 20 feet during Canobie Lake Park's "Rocket Man: The Human Cannonball" performance. The stuntman was unharmed.

== See also ==
- List of amusement parks in New England
