= Double-arch Sandstone Bridge =

- U.S. National Register of Historic Places
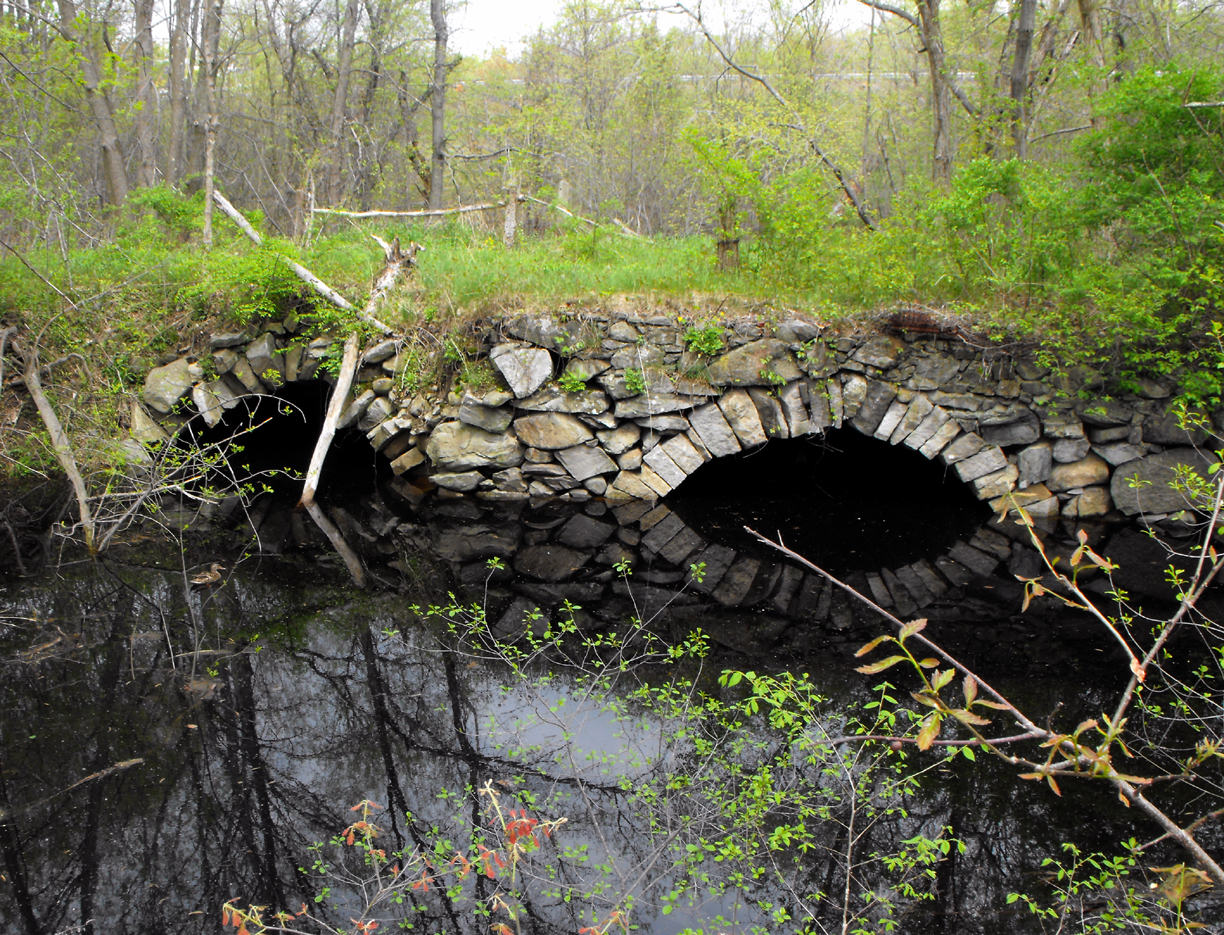
- Sands Bridge South Side

- Location within Massachusetts Location within the United States
- Location: Methuen, Massachusetts
- Coordinates: 42°44′33″N 71°12′29″W
- Built: 1835
- MPS: Methuen MRA
- NRHP reference No.: 84002326
- Added to NRHP: June 20, 1984

The Double-arch Sandstone Bridge or more commonly known as the Sands Bridge, is a historic dry stone arch bridge over the Spicket River on Hampshire Road in Methuen, Massachusetts. Built without mortar between the stones, parts of it date back to 1735. It was used to handle traffic between Methuen and Salem, New Hampshire.

== History ==
The location, along the old Dracut Path, was a marshy area of the Spicket River that could be forded by horse or cart. The ford eventually was bridged. The earliest town record, from the Town meeting of 1730, show a simple plank bridge was used which required regular maintenance at the cost of the township. The wooden bridge was replaced with the more durable stone arch bridge in 1835. Solid abutment supports were constructed on each river bank. A wooden frame shaped like the underside of the bridge, was constructed over the river. The stones where then set on the frame, without mortar. The bridge was filled in with rubble and dirt, which over time would compress against the abutments. The wooden frame was then removed. If constructed correctly a stone arch bridge should last indefinitely, but the Sands Bridge is not a well built bridge. Photographic evidence shows the keystone had slipped by the late nineteenth century. The bridge was used consistently until it was taken out of service in 1963 when the Spicket River was rerouted and Interstate 93 was built. It was added to the National Register of Historic Places June 20, 1984.

== Current status ==
In May 2009, the bridge was in a terrible state of disrepair and in danger of collapse. However, Methuen city officials wanted to make the area more accessible to the public and have unveiled plans to restore the bridge and build an adjoining park with walking paths, viewing areas, "rustic seating" and a parking lot.

As of Sept. 2012, the city of Methuen has allowed the bridge to fall further into disrepair. City officials have not taken any action to care for the bridge.

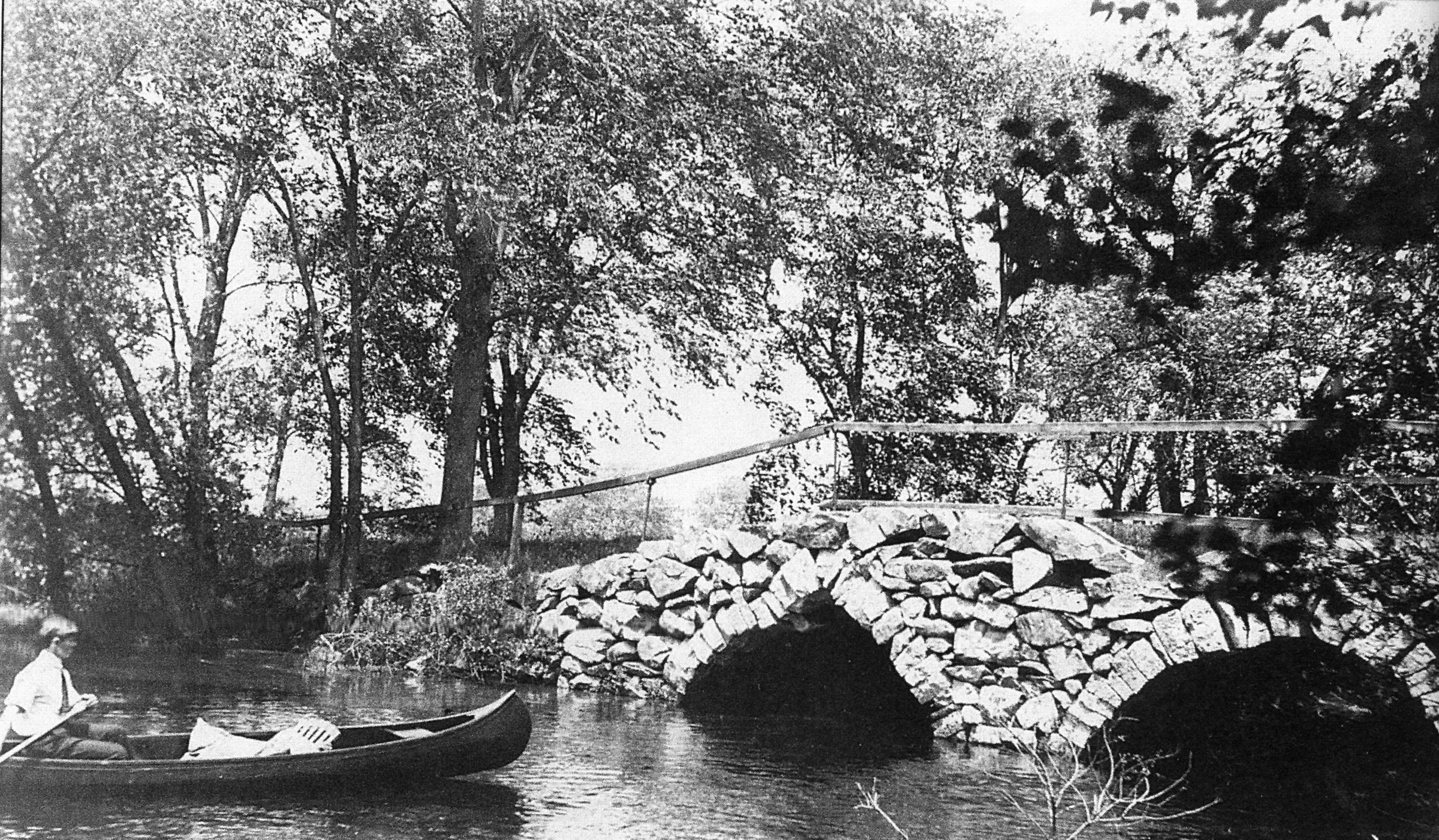
Sands Bridge circa 1900

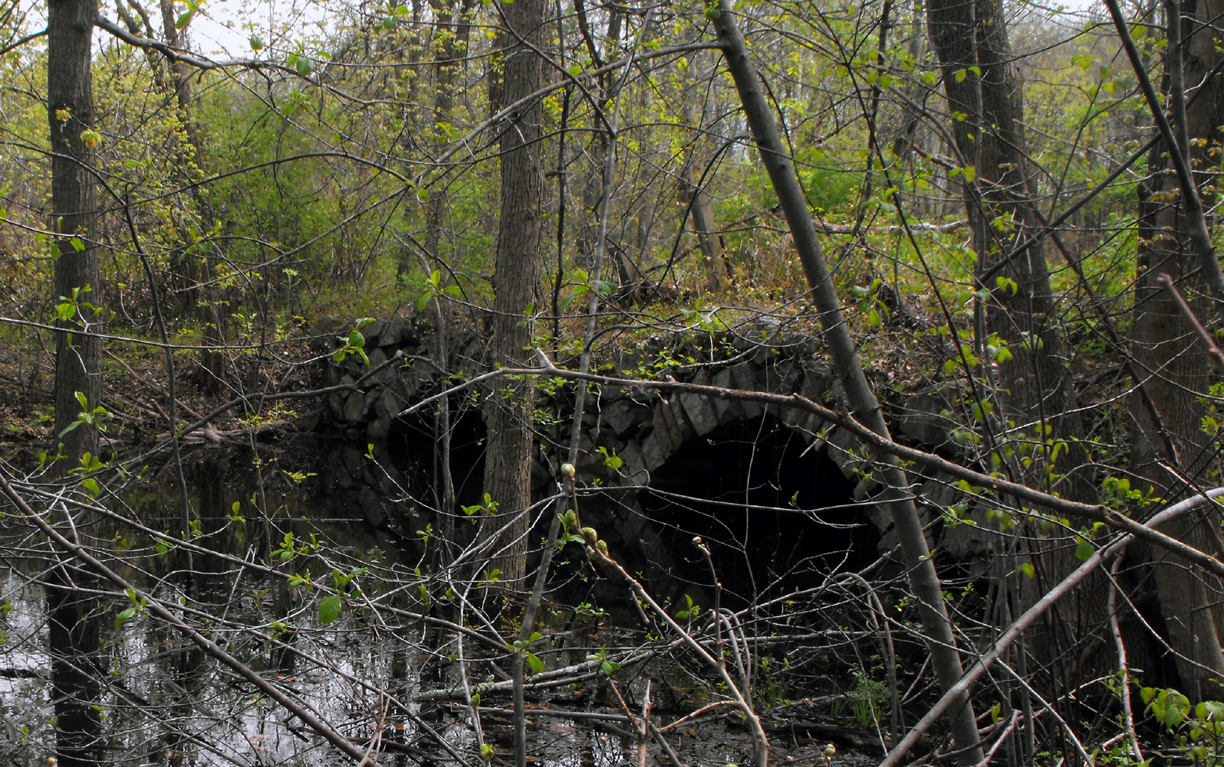
Sands Bridge North Side

== See also ==
- National Register of Historic Places listings in Methuen, Massachusetts
- List of bridges on the National Register of Historic Places in Massachusetts
