= House at 113–115 Center Street =

Historic house in Massachusetts, United States

- U.S. National Register of Historic Places
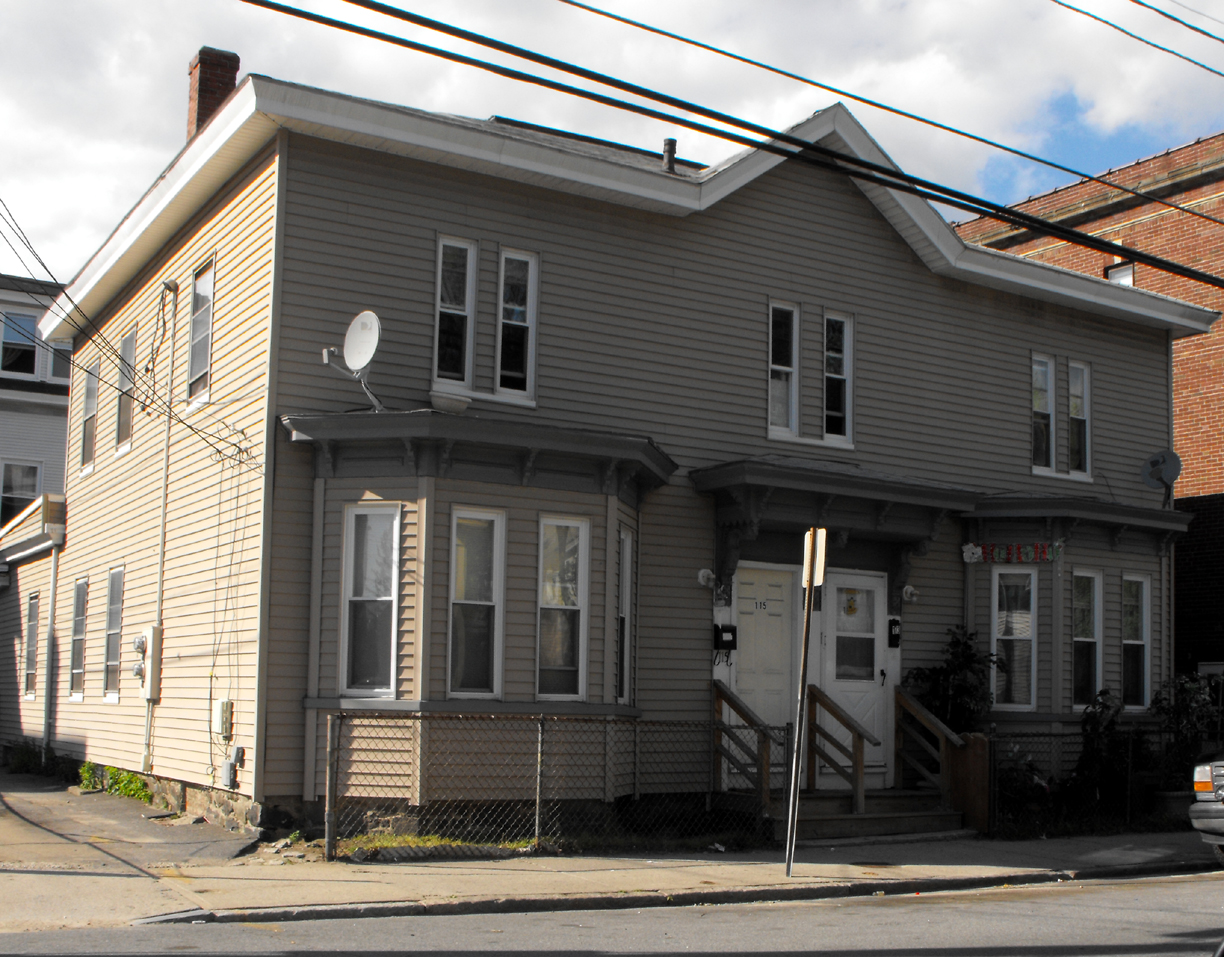

- Location within Massachusetts Location within the United States
- Location: 113–115 Center St., Methuen, Massachusetts
- Coordinates: 42°43′12″N 71°10′49″W
- Area: less than one acre
- Built: 1880
- Architectural style: Italianate
- MPS: Methuen MRA
- NRHP reference No.: 84002381
- Added to NRHP: January 20, 1984

113–115 Center Street is a historic two-family house in the Arlington Mills district of southern Methuen, Massachusetts. Built about 1880, it is a rare surviving example of the type of worker housing built early in the expansion of the Arlington Mills. It was added to the National Register of Historic Places in 1984.

== Description and history ==
113-115 Center Street is located in a densely built area of residential and mixed commercial-residential buildings. It is located on the north side of Center Street, just east of its junction with Broadway (Massachusetts Route 28), a major thoroughfare between Methuen and Lawrence, whose city line is not far to the south. The house is a two-story wood-frame structure, with a hip roof, vinyl siding exterior, and limited vernacular Italianate styling. The main facade is three bays wide, with a small gable above the central bay. The outer bays have polygonal bay windows on the ground floor, topped by a low-pitch roofs with Italianate brackets, and the center bay has a pair of entrances, sheltered by a hood supported by three large Italianate brackets.

Center Street was one of the first streets to experience residential development due to the expansion of the Arlington Mills, located to the west on the banks of the Spicket River. It lies in what is now the Arlington Mills Historic District, the area immediately to the west along Stevens Pond of the Spicket River. The mills employed thousands of workers who lived in Lawrence and Methuen, but owned comparatively little housing. This residence, built about 1880, is one of the few surviving example of an early two family duplex house (side by side house) seen in mill housing area. It is a particularly well-preserved example in an area where there has been considerable demolition and alteration, although it has lost some of its decorative elements due to the application of siding and a new roof.

== See also ==
- National Register of Historic Places listings in Methuen, Massachusetts
- National Register of Historic Places listings in Essex County, Massachusetts
