= Canobie Corkscrew =

Former roller coaster at Canobie Lake Park

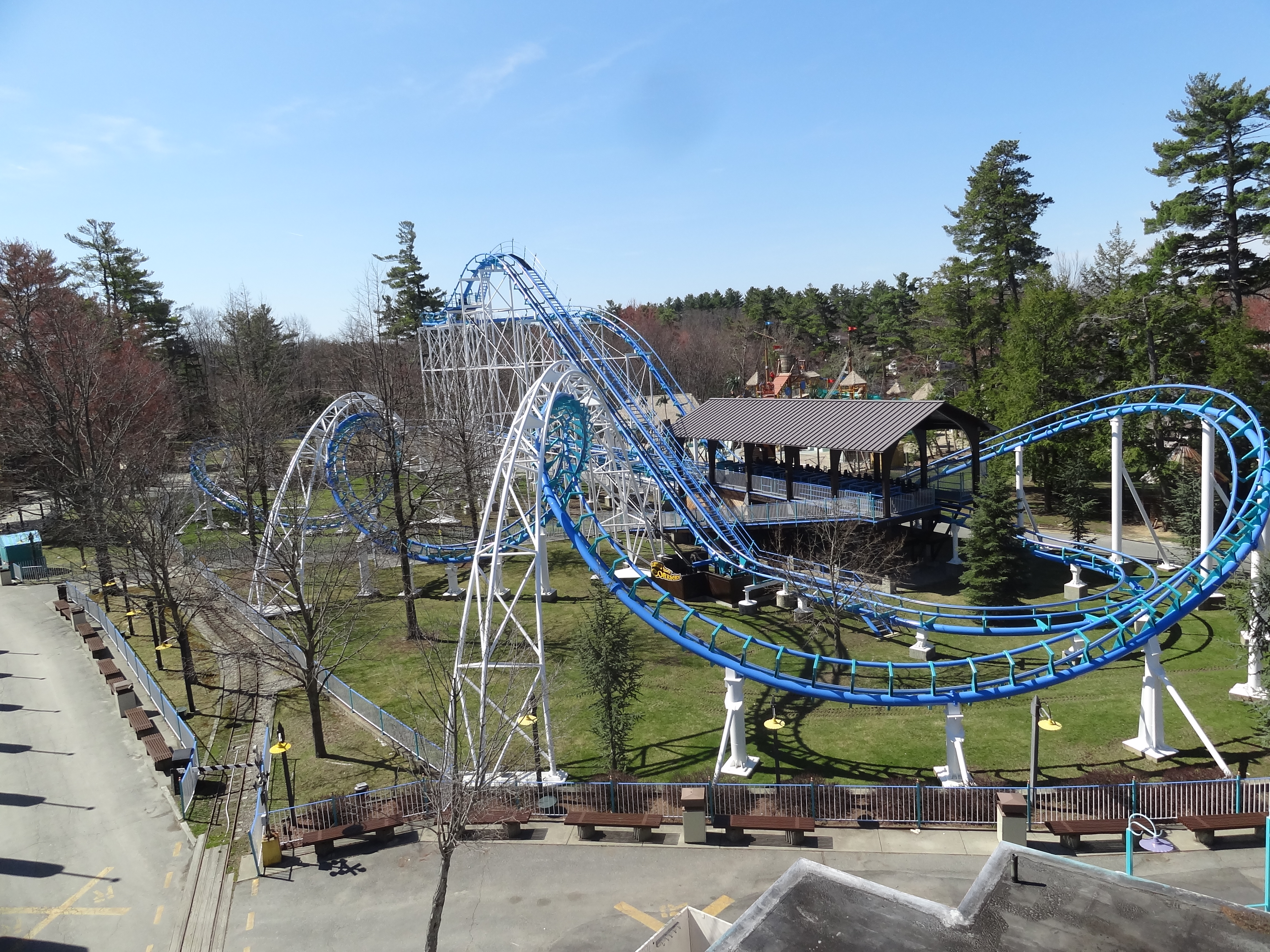
- Canobie Corkscrew in 2013

Canobie Lake Park
- Location: Canobie Lake Park
- Coordinates: 42°47′36.43″N 71°14′59.82″W
- Status: Removed
- Opening date: 1975 (Old Chicago), 1982 (Alabama State Fairgrounds), 1990 (Canobie Lake Park)
- Closing date: 2021

General statistics
- Type: Steel
- Manufacturer: Arrow Development
- Model: Corkscrew
- Lift/launch system: Chain lift hill
- Height: 73 ft (22 m)
- Speed: 45 mph (72 km/h)
- Inversions: 2
- Duration: 1:30
- Height restriction: 48 in (122 cm)
- Trains: Single train with 6 cars; riders arranged 2 across in 2 rows for a total of 24 riders per train
- Canobie Corkscrew at RCDB

Canobie Corkscrew was a steel roller coaster located at Canobie Lake Park in Salem, New Hampshire, United States. It was one of many Arrow Development Corkscrew models produced between 1975 and 1979. The coaster was removed in 2021.

== History ==
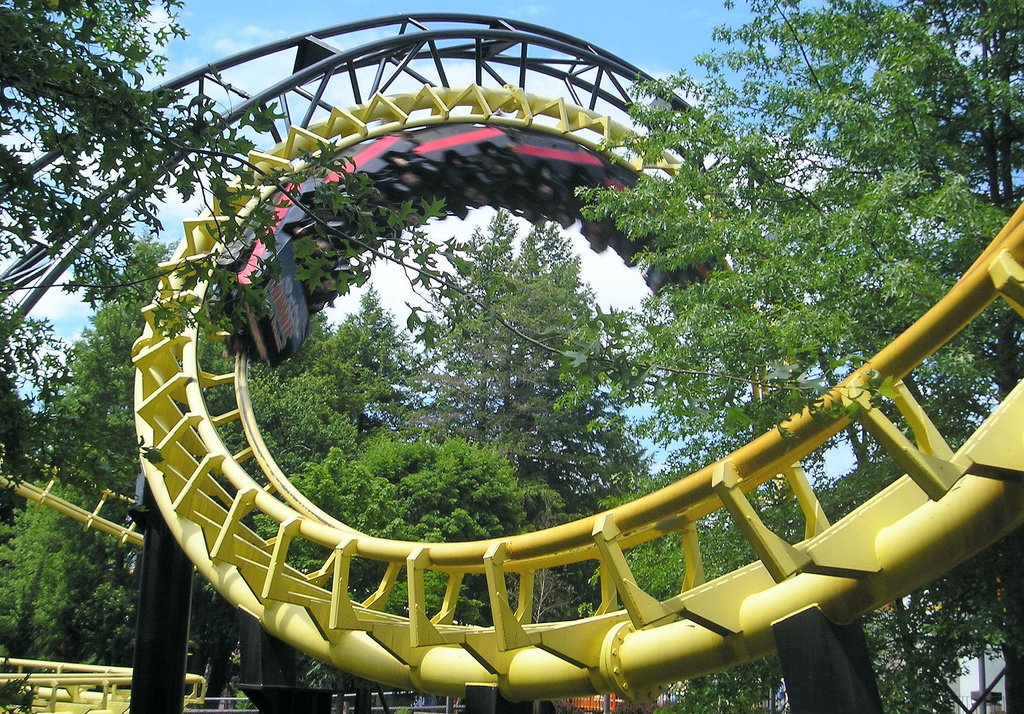
Canobie Corkscrew in 2007

Canobie Corkscrew first operated in 1975 as Chicago Loop at Old Chicago in Bolingbrook, Illinois. It was only the second roller coaster in the world to take riders upside down twice. It stayed at Old Chicago until the park's closure in 1980. It was featured in the 1978 film The Fury.

The ride was moved to the Alabama State Fairgrounds in 1982, where it operated as Corkscrew until 1986. It was moved to Canobie Lake Park in 1990, where it was renamed Canobie Corkscrew. The ride was featured in an advertisement for the video game RollerCoaster Tycoon 2.

The ride was removed after the 2021 season due to rising maintenance costs, and its second corkscrew was donated to the National Roller Coaster Museum and Archives, where it will be restored and put on display.
