= The Mall at Rockingham Park =

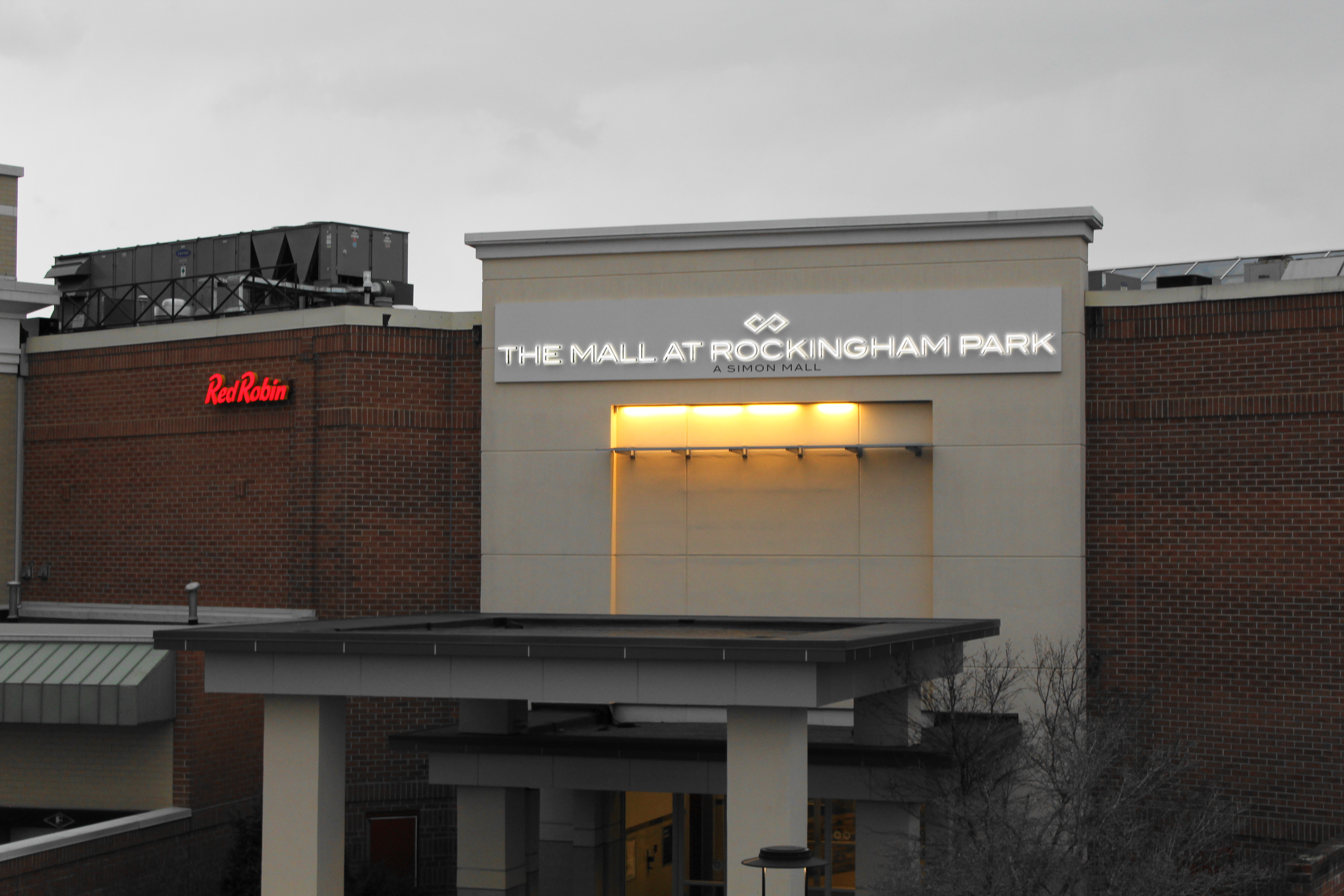
- One of the entrances to the mall as seen in April 2022
- Location: Salem, New Hampshire, United States
- Coordinates: 42°46′06″N 71°13′51″W
- Opened: August 1991
- Developer: Melvin Simon & Associates
- Manager: Simon Property Group
- Owner: Simon Property Group (28.2%)
- Num. of stores: 144
- Num. of anchor tenants: 4
- Floor area: 1,024,171 sq ft (95,148.6 m^{2})
- Floors: 2
- Website: Mall at Rockingham Park

The Mall at Rockingham Park is a shopping mall in the town of Salem, New Hampshire, about 30 miles (48 km) north of Boston. It is the largest shopping mall in the state of New Hampshire, with 1,024,171 square feet (95,148.6 m^{2}) of floor space. The mall is adjacent to Interstate 93 and the former Rockingham Park race track in Salem, and was the state's third shopping mall to be built. The mall is managed by Simon Property Group, which owns a 28.2% interest. As of March 2015, the mall was Simon's highest grossing center, with annual sales of $2,105 per square foot.

== History ==
The Mall at Rockingham Park opened in August 1991 with three anchors - Filene's, JC Penney and Sears. A fourth anchor, Jordan Marsh, opened in 1994. All Jordan Marsh stores converted to Macy's in 1996. The Mall at Rockingham Park is located close to the Massachusetts state line.

In 2006, the existing Macy's anchor store (formerly Jordan Marsh) closed, and the Filene's anchor store was converted to Macy's.

In 2012, Lord & Taylor renovated and converted the vacant Macy's/Jordan Marsh anchor, opening its only New Hampshire store in March 2012.

In October 2015, Dick's Sporting Goods opened on the second floor of Sears, as part of a deal with the company, while Sears consolidated on the first floor.

The Sears anchor store closed in 2018. A Cinemark Theatres complex opened in 2020 near the site of the original Sears Auto Center, which is separate from the rest of the mall.

All Lord & Taylor stores closed permanently in August 2020, as a direct result of the COVID-19 pandemic.

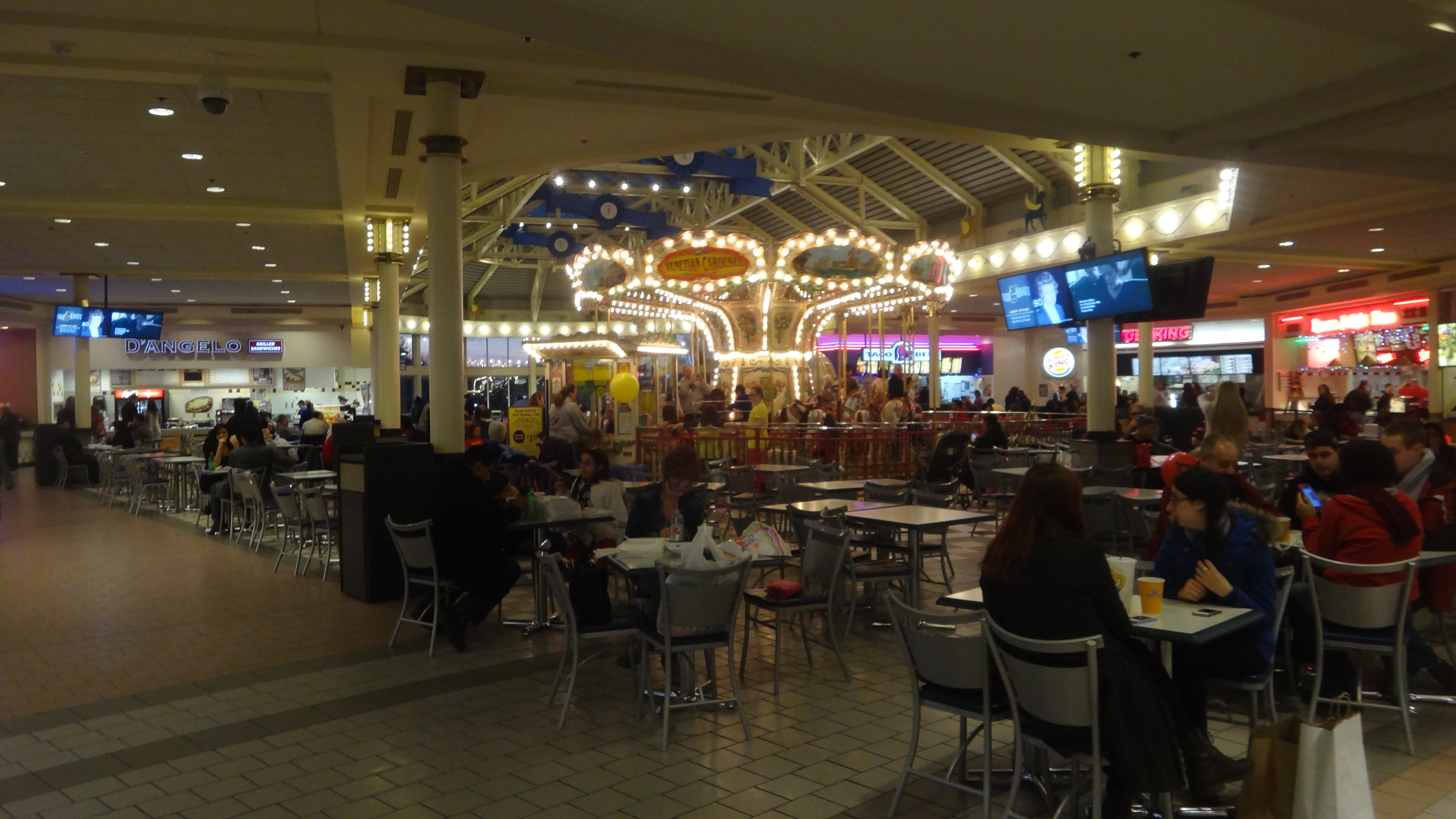
The Mall at Rockingham Park food court in 2014

On July 9, 2025, Casino Salem opened in the former Lord & Taylor building. One week into its operation, Churchill Downs bought the casino and became the majority owner. In 2026, Churchill Downs announced they would be investing approximately $180 million to $200 million in a facelift of the casino building. Churchill Downs also announced that Casino Salem would be renamed the Rockingham Grand Casino. Renovation work is expected to be finished by mid-2027.
