= Yankee Cannonball =

Roller coaster at Canobie Lake Park

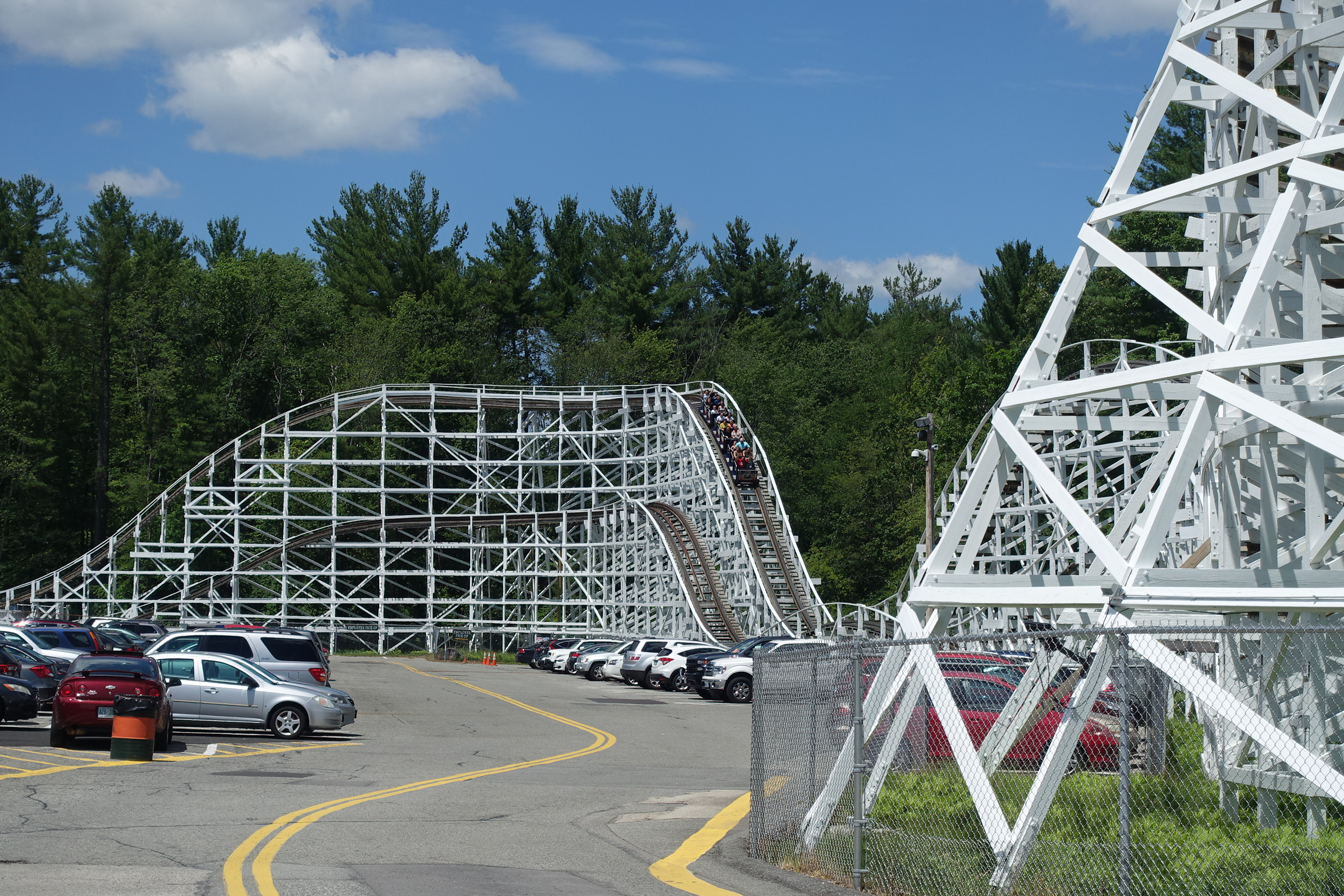

Canobie Lake Park
- Location: Canobie Lake Park
- Coordinates: 42.79527°N 71.24922°W
- Status: Operating
- Opening date: 1936

General statistics
- Type: Wood
- Manufacturer: Philadelphia Toboggan Coasters
- Designer: Herbert Paul Schmeck
- Track layout: Out-and-back
- Lift/launch system: Chain lift hill
- Height: 65 ft (20 m)
- Drop: 63.5 ft (19.4 m)
- Length: 2,000 ft (610 m)
- Speed: 35 mph (56 km/h)
- Trains: 2 (only 1 in use) trains with 3 cars; riders arranged 2 across in 3 rows for a total of 18 riders per train
- Yankee Cannonball at RCDB

Yankee Cannonball is a wooden roller coaster originally built in 1930 at Lakewood Park, and relocated in 1936 to Canobie Lake Park in Salem, New Hampshire, United States. The roller coaster features an out-and-back layout.

== History ==
The roller coaster was designed by Herbert Paul Schmeck of Philadelphia Toboggan Coasters. Its serial number is 86. In 1930, it was installed under the name Roller Coaster at Lakewood Park in Waterbury, Connecticut, though it would later be renamed to Meteor. Frank F. Hoover oversaw the construction. The coaster operated in Connecticut for only two years before being closed and dismantled. It remained in pieces onsite until 1935, when it was moved to Canobie Lake Park. This was the earliest successful relocation of a large-scale wooden roller coaster.

When the ride was moved to Canobie Lake Park in 1936, each section was shortened by six inches to help it fit within the planned area. It reopened in 1936 as Greyhound. In 1983, it was renamed again to Yankee Cannonball, in commemoration of the American Civil War.

The lift hill was destroyed by Hurricane Carol in 1954, and the ride was closed for repair during the following 1955 season. The coaster has been retracked several times, some of which was done by Martin & Vleminckx.

On June 20, 2013, the Yankee Cannonball was awarded the Coaster Landmark status by ACE for its historical significance.

== Incident ==
On July 27, 2001, two trains collided at the base of the lift hill, injuring five people. The incident was caused by the operator's failure to engage the ride's brakes. In response, both Yankee Cannonball and the park's Canobie Corkscrew were limited to one train operations. Yankee Cannonball's trains also received seatbelts following this incident.
