= Island Pond (Rockingham County, New Hampshire) =

Lake in Rockingham County, New Hampshire, United States

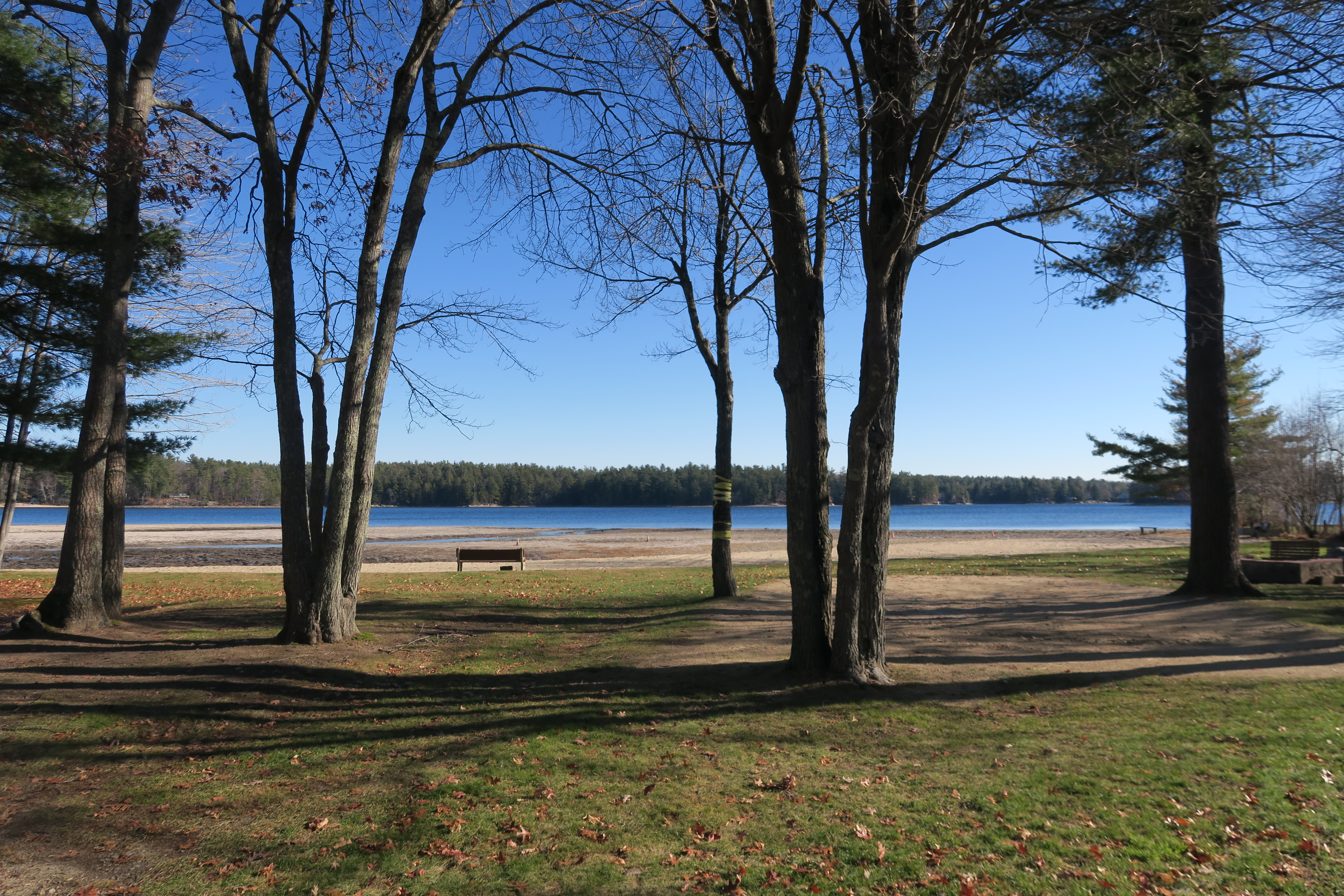
- Island Pond

- Location within New Hampshire Location within the United States
- Location: Rockingham County, New Hampshire
- Coordinates: 42°52′3″N 71°12′48″W
- Primary inflows: Taylor Brook; Drew Brook; Wash Pond Brook
- Primary outflows: Spicket River
- Basin countries: United States
- Max. length: 2.5 mi (4.0 km)
- Max. width: 0.6 mi (0.97 km)
- Surface area: 532 acres (2.15 km^{2})
- Average depth: 34 feet (10 m)
- Max. depth: 70 feet (21 m)
- Surface elevation: 205 feet (62.5 m)
- Islands: Governors Island; Escumbuit Island; Loon Island; Chase Island; Sheep Island; Pine Island; George's Island; Muskrat Island
- Settlements: Derry; Hampstead, Atkinson

Island Pond (sometimes referred to locally as Big Island Pond) is a 532-acre (215 ha) water body located in Rockingham County in southern New Hampshire, in the towns of Derry, Hampstead and Atkinson.

== Geography ==
The pond is at the head of the Spicket River watershed, which feeds into the Merrimack River in Lawrence, Massachusetts. The pond was formed from the merger of Perch Pond in Hampstead and Lake Wentworth in Derry in 1878, when a new dam raised the water level by 8.5 feet (2.6 m).

The pond is named for Governor's Island, a 231-acre (90 ha) island that lies within it. The island in turn is named for Benning Wentworth, colonial governor of New Hampshire, who built a summer residence on the north end of the island called Birch Farm. A smaller island is named after the Native American chief Escumbuit.

The lake is classified as a cold and warmwater fishery and contains largemouth and smallmouth bass, brook trout, rainbow trout, brown trout, chain pickerel, horned pout, white perch, black crappie, and bluegill.

== See also ==
- List of lakes in New Hampshire
