= Arlington Mill Reservoir =

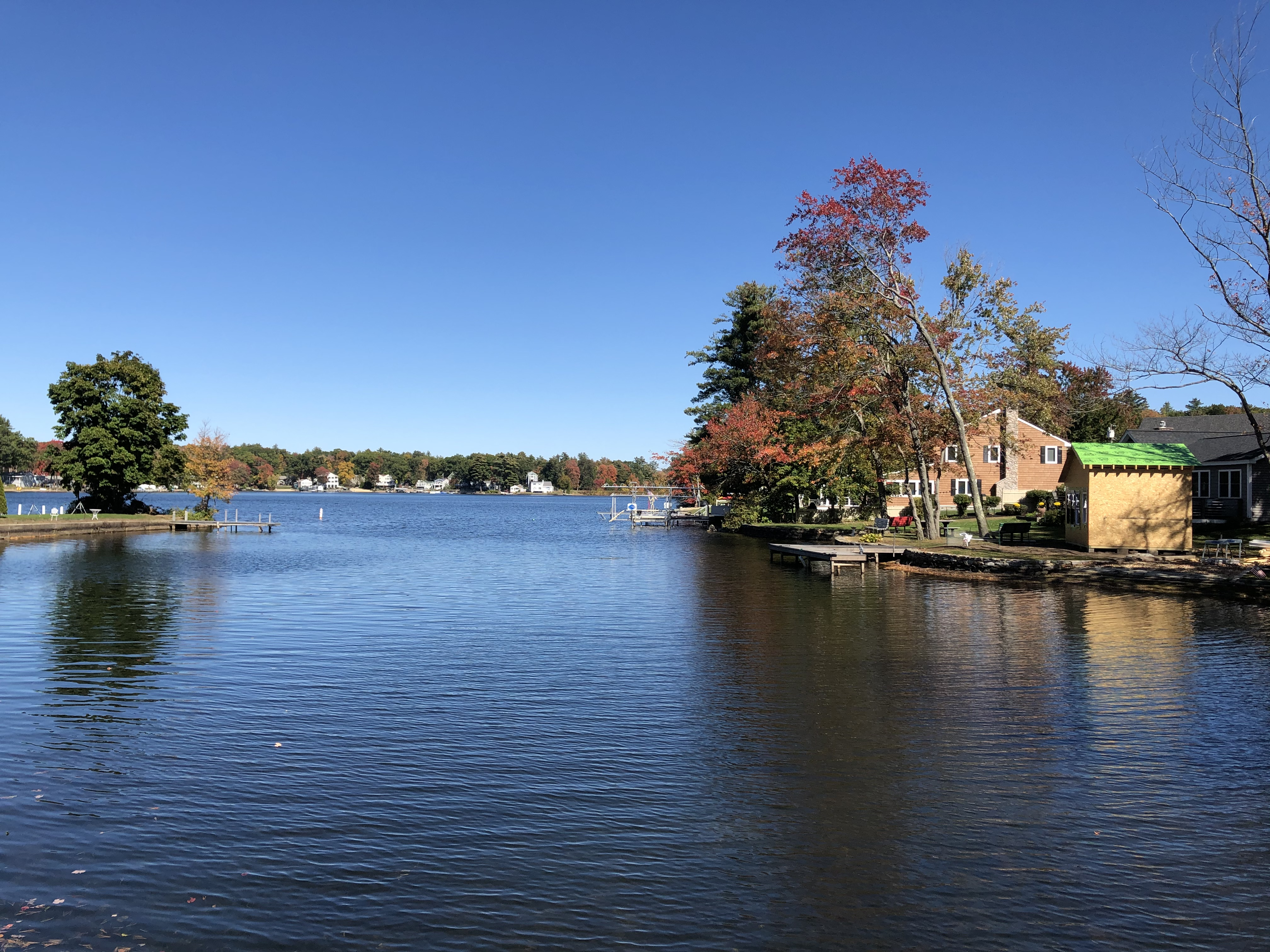
- View from Cove Road

- Location within New Hampshire Location within the United States
- Location: Rockingham County, New Hampshire
- Coordinates: 42°49′32″N 71°12′50″W
- Type: Reservoir
- Primary inflows: Spicket River
- Primary outflows: Spicket River
- Basin countries: United States
- Max. length: 1.7 mi (2.7 km)
- Max. width: 0.4 mi (0.64 km)
- Surface area: 269 acres (1.09 km^{2})
- Average depth: 10 ft (3.0 m)
- Max. depth: 39 ft (12 m)
- Surface elevation: 162 ft (49 m)
- Settlements: Salem

Arlington Mill Reservoir, known locally as "Arlington Pond", is a 269-acre (109 ha) impoundment located in Rockingham County in southern New Hampshire, United States, in the town of Salem. It is located along the Spicket River, a small stream that flows south to the Merrimack River in Lawrence, Massachusetts.

The lake is classified as a warmwater fishery, with observed species including smallmouth bass, largemouth bass, chain pickerel, horned pout, white perch, black crappie, and bluegill. There is no official public boat access.

== See also ==
- List of lakes in New Hampshire
- Canobie Lake
