= Canobie Lake =

Lake in New Hampshire, United States

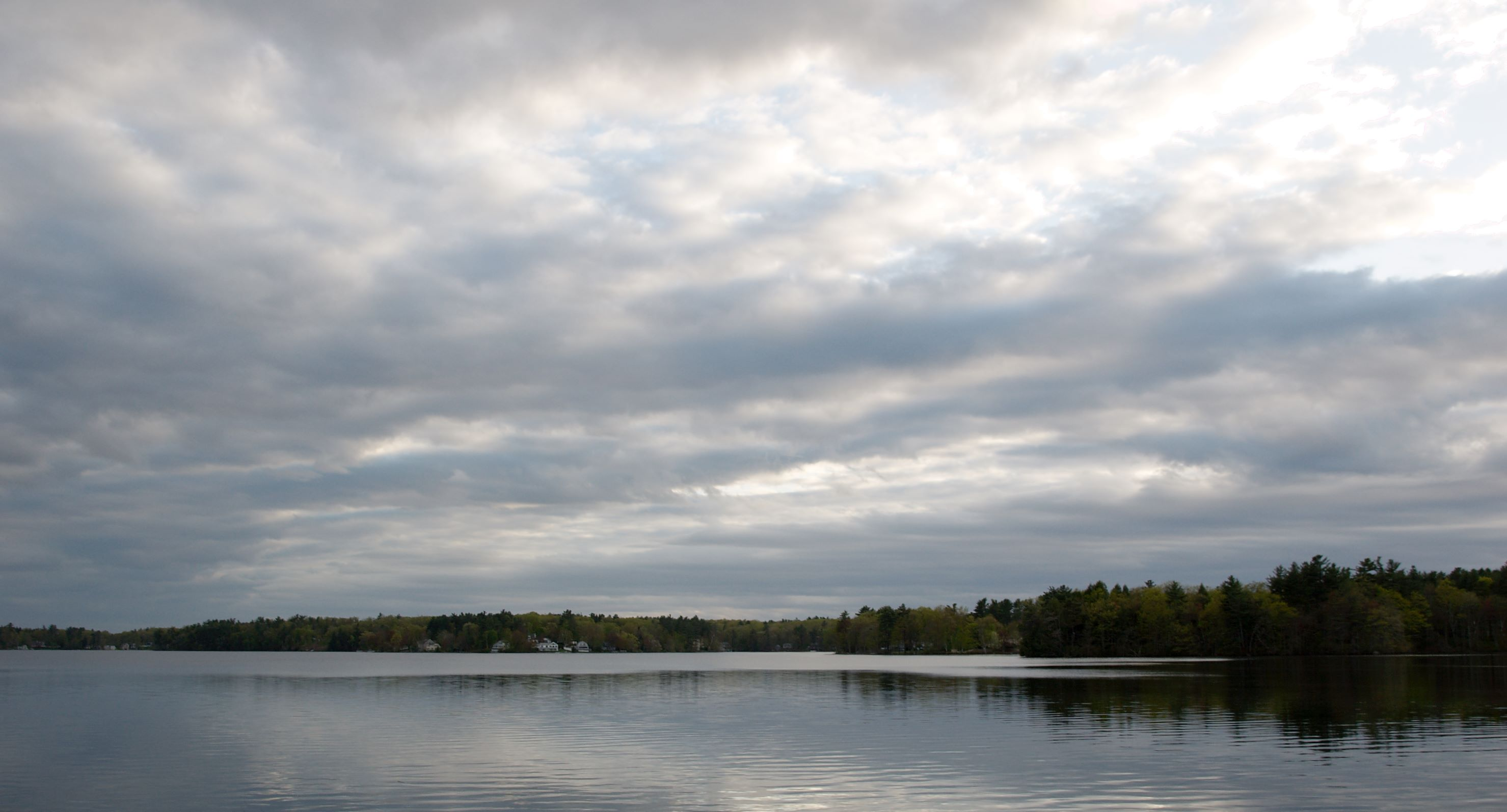
- Canobie Lake

- Location within New Hampshire Location within the United States
- Location: Rockingham County, New Hampshire
- Coordinates: 42°47′51″N 71°15′18″W
- Primary outflows: Policy Brook
- Basin countries: United States
- Max. length: 1.5 mi (2.4 km)
- Max. width: 1.0 mi (1.6 km)
- Surface area: 375 acres (1.52 km^{2})
- Average depth: 28 ft (8.5 m)
- Max. depth: 40 ft (12 m)
- Surface elevation: 219 feet (67 m)
- Settlements: Salem; Windham

Canobie Lake is a 375-acre (1.52 km^{2}) body of water located in Rockingham County in southern New Hampshire, United States, in the towns of Salem and Windham. It is approximately 1.5 miles (2.4 km) long, and on average 0.4 miles (0.64 km) wide, though two arms of the lake combine to produce a width of 1 mile (1.6 km) at the lake's center. Canobie Lake Park, an amusement park, is located on the lake's east shore. The lake is the water supply for the town of Salem, New Hampshire.

Canobie Lake is predominantly spring-fed. Aside from the amusement park, the shores of the lake are primarily lined with houses. Water from the lake flows via Policy Brook to the Spicket River and thence to the Merrimack River in Lawrence, Massachusetts.

The lake is classified as a warmwater fishery, with observed species including largemouth bass, smallmouth bass, chain pickerel, brown bullhead, black crappie, rainbow trout, brook trout, bluegill, and pumpkinseed.

== See also ==
- List of lakes in New Hampshire
- Canobie Lake Park
