= Valerie McDonnell =

American politician

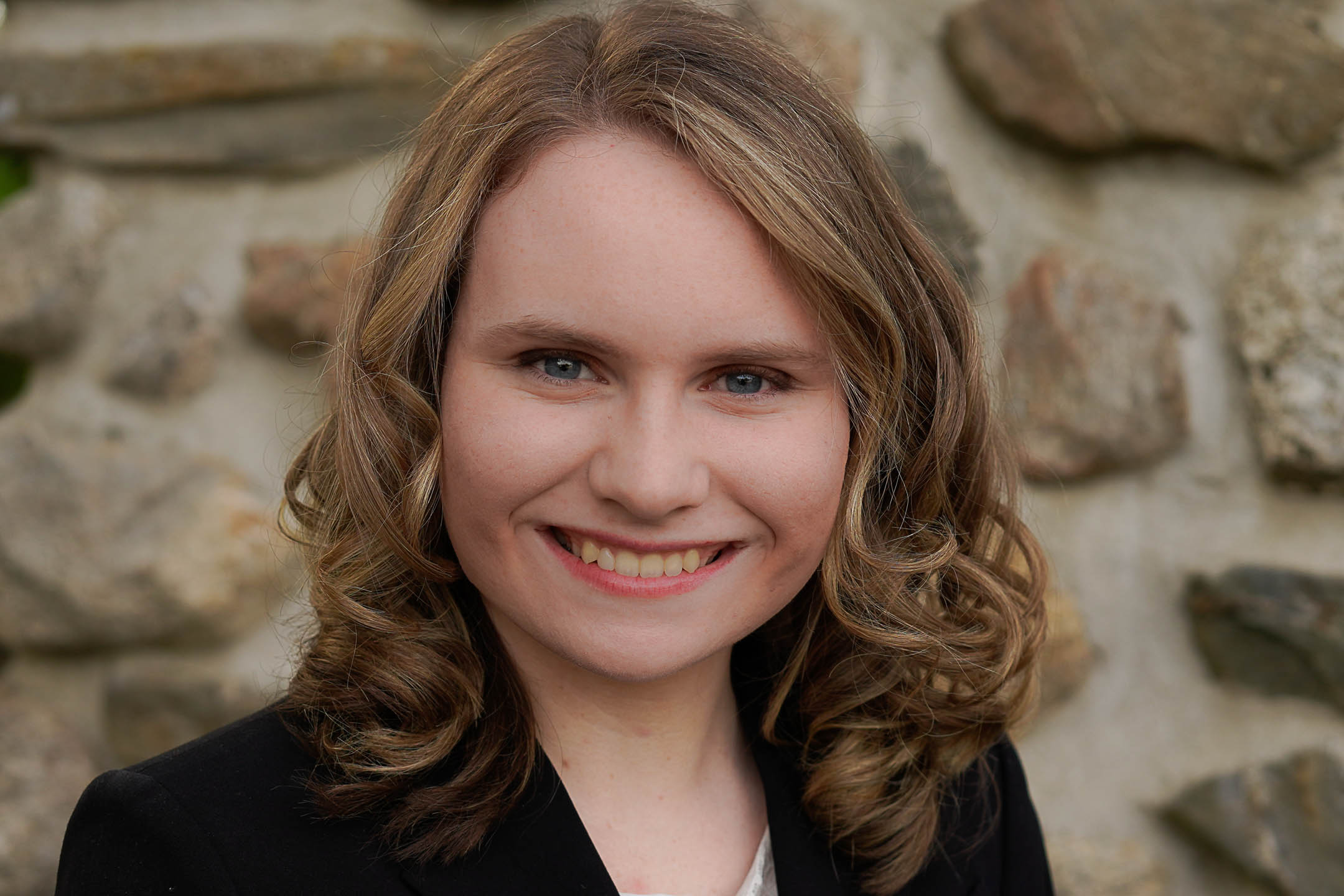

Member of the New Hampshire House of Representatives from the Rockingham 25th district
- Incumbent
- Assumed office December 7, 2022

Personal details
- Born: May 25, 2004 (age 22)
- Party: Republican
- Education: Salem High School and Southern New Hampshire University (BA)
- Website: Official website

Valerie McDonnell (born May 25, 2004) is an American politician serving as a member of the New Hampshire House of Representatives for Rockingham County's 25th District. Elected in November 2022, she assumed office on December 7, 2022.

== Early life and education ==
Valerie McDonnell was born to parents Brian McDonnell and Pauline McDonnell in 2004. She is a native of Salem, New Hampshire.

McDonnell graduated from Salem High School in 2022 and Southern New Hampshire University in 2024, earning a Bachelor's of Arts Degree in Political Science. In 2021 and 2022, McDonnell was both the New Hampshire State Champion and a National Finalist in the American Legion Oratorical Contest.

== Career ==
In 2022, Valerie McDonnell was first elected to represent Rockingham's 25th District of the New Hampshire House of Representatives, becoming the youngest elected legislator in the state’s history and the second-youngest elected state legislator in American history. In her first term, McDonnell was a recipient of the Congressman John Lewis Youth Leadership Award from the National Association of Secretaries of State.

In 2024, McDonnell was re-elected. She sponsored SB 295 (2025) which expanded eligibility for K-12 school choice universally in New Hampshire. The Education Freedom Account (EFA) Program was the subject of much controversy, but received glowing support from Governor Kelly Ayotte who signed SB 295 into law on June 10, 2025. Supporters expressed praise for the law change, claiming New Hampshire’s school choice model should be emulated by states nationwide.

Valerie McDonnell speaks with a West Palm Beach audience in 2023.

McDonnell was named to President Donald Trump's New Hampshire Leadership Team for the 2024 presidential election.

She was re-elected on November 3, 2026, triumphant despite a national blue tsunami.

== See also ==
- List of the youngest state legislators in the United States
