= KMG (company) =

Dutch company manufacturing amusement rides

- Type: Manufacturers - Amusement Rides
- Industry: Manufacturing
- Founded: 1989
- Founder: Isje Kroon
- Headquarters: Neede, Netherlands
- Area served: Worldwide
- Products: Amusement rides
- Website: kmgrides.com

KMG is a Dutch conglomerate company manufacturing amusement rides, located in Neede, Gelderland. KMG has constructed over 300 rides to date.

The following, among others, are KMG rides:

- Afterburner (sold under the name Fireball in the US), a Pendulum ride.
- Discovery
- Discovery v2.0
- Freak Out
- Speed
- Experience
- XXL
- Fun Factory
- Tango
- X-Factory (Miami)
- Speed Buzz
- High Swing
- Experience
- Move It 32
- Move It 24 (smaller version of the Move It 32)
- Move It 18
- Para Jump (Discontinued)
- Tropical Trip
- Swing It
- Inversion 12
- XLR8
- Sicko
- Mission Space
- Inversion 24 (known as Infinity)
- Surf Ride
- Speed 32 (A 65 meter speed using the A Frame of a XXL)
- X-Drive

== Accident ==
In July 2017, the Fire Ball ride (KMG's version of a Frisbee pendulum ride known as the Afterburner, not to be confused with another ride commonly known as the Fire Ball) broke apart at the Ohio State Fair, resulting in one death and seven injuries. Following the incident, the operator of the fair ride, Amusements of America, settled multiple lawsuits with the victims of the incident, including settlements for 1.7 million and 1.3 million dollars. As of 2019, an additional lawsuit against KMG has been filed by the victims, alleging that the ride manufacturer concealed a catastrophic defect that led to the tragedy.

== Bankruptcy ==
June 2nd 2026, the subsidiary KMG International B.V. filed for bankruptcy. The by court appointed liquidator will start an investigation and try to recover assets for the creditors.
