= Tango (ride) =

Amusement ride model

Tango is an amusement ride design produced by the Dutch company KMG that was introduced in 2002. Most carnivals require riders to be 54 inches (137 cm).

KMG Tango in operation at LA County Fair.

== Operation and Design ==
The Tango is twenty-three meters high, and it revolves around 3 different axes and has room for twenty-four persons, with eight on each axes.

The Tango is built on one central trailer. The construction time of this attraction amounts 4 to 5 hours with 3 persons.
