= America's Stonehenge =

Tourist attraction in New Hampshire

Coordinates: 42°50′35″N 71°12′25″W

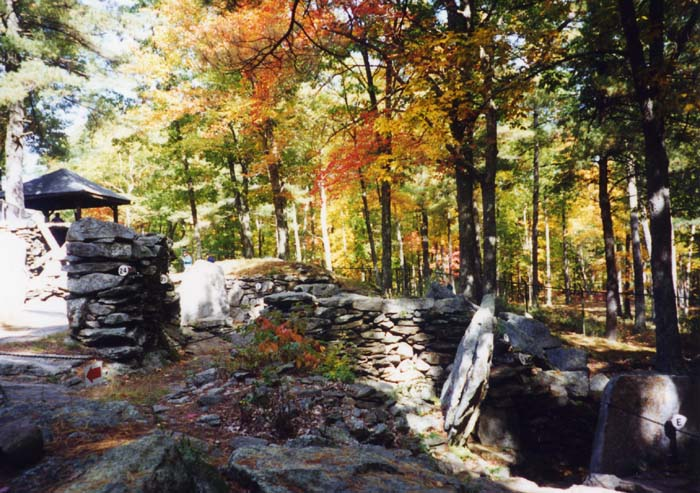
Some of the rocks at America's Stonehenge.

America's Stonehenge is a privately owned tourist attraction and archaeological site consisting of a number of large rocks and stone structures scattered around roughly 30 acres (12 hectares) within the town of Salem, New Hampshire, in the United States. It is open to the public for a fee as part of a recreational area which includes snowshoe trails and an alpaca farm.

A number of hypotheses exist as to the origin and purpose of the structures. One viewpoint is a mixture of land-use practices of local farmers in the 18th and 19th centuries and construction of structures by owner William Goodwin, an insurance executive who purchased the area in 1937. Some claim that the site has a pre-Columbian European origin, but this is regarded as pseudoarchaeological. Archaeologist David Starbuck has said: "It is widely believed that Goodwin may have 'created' much of what is visible at the site today."

The site was first dubbed Mystery Hill by William Goodwin. This was the official name of the site until 1982, when it was renamed "America's Stonehenge", a term coined in a news article in the early 1960s. The rebranding was an effort to separate it from roadside oddity sites and to reinforce the idea that it is an ancient archaeological site. The area is named after Stonehenge in England, although there is no evidence of cultural or historical connection between the two.

It is mentioned, as Mystery Hill, on New Hampshire Historical Marker No. 72.

== History ==
Archaeologists radio-carbon analysis of charcoal on the site shows that there were humans occupying the area 4,000 years ago.

In 1982, David Stewart-Smith, director of restoration at Mystery Hill, conducted an excavation of a megalith found in a stone quarry to the north of the main site. His research team excavated the quarry site under the supervision of the New Hampshire state archaeologist and discovered hundreds of chips and flakes from the stone. They concluded that this was evidence of tool manufacture, consistent with American indigenous lithic techniques, although no date could be ascertained. Archaeologist Curtis Runnels stated, "No Bronze Age artifacts have been found there. ... In fact, no one has found a single artifact of European origin from that period anywhere in the New World."

The surface of the stone suggests that it was quarried with percussion techniques, indicating that the stone was modeled by indigenous stone workers as it was sculpted by indigenous stone tools rather than the metal tools that were used by European settlers. Some also speculate that the structure is an accurate astronomical calendar that can be used to predict lunar and solar events in North America.

The remains of a Native American wigwam have been found in the area and a replica can be seen next to the trail. Associated with it were two fire pits that date back to 2,000 years ago. A canoe dated to approximately 300 years ago can be seen in the museum. Various Native American tools and pottery have also been found on the site.

The site first appears in print in the 1907 History of Salem, N.H.:

Jonathan Pattee's Cave. He had a house in these woods 70 years ago; took town paupers before the town farm was bought. This is a wild but beautiful spot, among rough boulders and soft pines, about which the most weird and fantastic tale might be woven. There are several caves still intact, which the owner used for storage purposes.

Many believe that Pattee built the site in the nineteenth century, and no unequivocal pre-Columbian European artifacts have been found there.

The site's history is muddled partly because of the activities of William Goodwin, who became convinced that the location was proof that Irish monks (the Culdees) had lived there long before the time of Christopher Columbus, and he sought to publicize the concept. He held a strong belief that the site was built by Irish monks, and because of this he rearranged many stones to fit his theory. The site has been altered by stone quarrying, and also by Goodwin and others who wanted to move the stones to what they considered to be their original locations; Goodwin might have been responsible for much of what can now be seen. Many of the stones have drill marks from the quarrying that took place on the site.

The myth that Irish people came to North America pre-1500 spawned from the life of Irish priest St. Brendan, who was said to have sailed to North America in the late 500s or early 600s. This myth led Goodwin and others to believe the site had been built by Irish monks. However, there is no archaeological evidence of this happening.

In 2019, the site was vandalized with power tools. On March 4, 2021, NH State Police arrested Mark L. Russo, a member of the online group "QAnon" and charged him with criminal mischief. Two inscriptions were etched into the so-called "sacrificial table": the QAnon slogan WWG1WGA meaning "Where we go one, we go all" and IAMMARK, Russo's Twitter handle. By using a pseudonym to search, social media researcher Chris Walters found photographs showing the site as well as items later found by the police. Later, it was determined that two QAnon followers had had an adult son who had died. Both believed that the "sacrificial table" was real and a worldwide conspiracy led by Hillary Clinton had killed their sons in order to extract adrenochrome, which they believed could renew life.

== The "Sacrificial Stone" ==
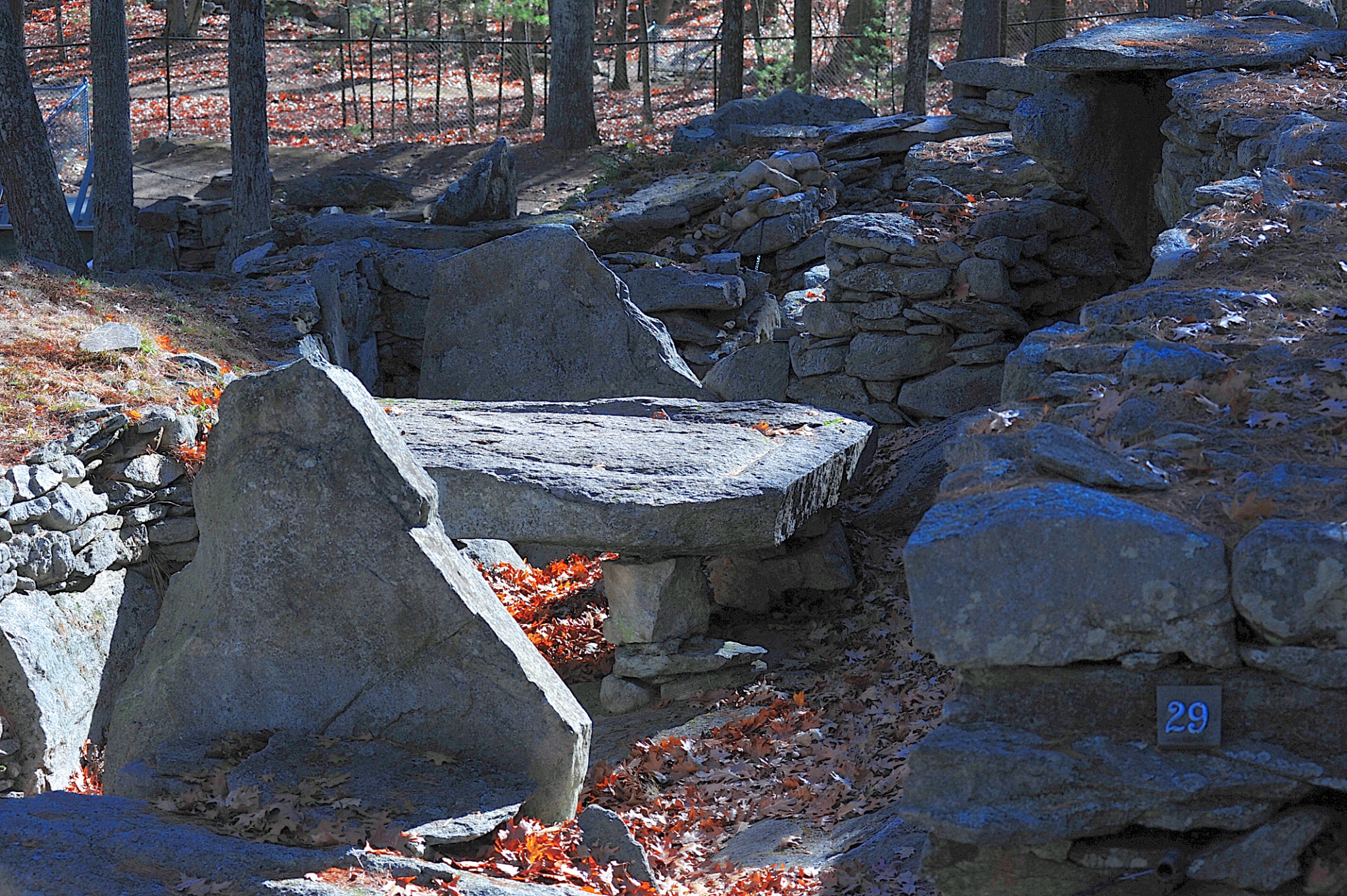
The "Sacrificial Stone"

There is a so-called "sacrificial stone" which contains grooves on site that some say channeled blood, but it closely resembles "lye-leaching stones" found on many old farms that were used to extract lye from wood ashes, the first step in the manufacture of soap. The "sacrificial stone" could have also been a cider press bed stone, a common tool among colonial farmers in New England, the grooves in the table serving to collect the cider.

== In popular culture ==
American horror writer H. P. Lovecraft was an enthusiast for New England megalith sites, and he visited Mystery Hill sometime between 1928 and the 1930s. The site is popularly attributed as inspiration for his story "The Dunwich Horror". Scholars, however, place Lovecraft's visit too late to have inspired the 1929 story.

Barry Fell in the book America BC: Ancient Settlers in the New World, published in 1976 and revised in 1986, claimed that there was evidence of occupation in pre-Columbian times based on astronomically linked positioning of stones and claims of Phoenician inscriptions written in Ogham. However, Barry Fell's specialty was marine biology, and though he wrote about archaeology and epigraphy, experts have widely deemed his writings to be pseudo-archaeological.

The site has been featured or mentioned on a number of television programs including:

- American History Channel TV series Secrets of the Ancient World which aired on January 14, 2002, in which Boston University archaeology professor Curtis Runnels refuted the theory that it was built by Celts in ancient history.
- In Search of... TV series which focused on investigating supposedly mysterious phenomena. The show presented the speculation that the site was of ancient Minoan origin. The episode aired on April 24, 1977.

== See also ==
- Stonehenge replicas and derivatives
