= Spicket River =

- Bridge on Osgood St in Methuen, MA

- Location within Massachusetts Location within New Hampshire Location within the United States

Location
- Country: United States
- States: New Hampshire, Massachusetts
- County: Rockingham, NH; Essex, MA
- Towns and city: Derry, NH, Salem, NH; Methuen, MA, Lawrence, MA

Physical characteristics
- Source: Island Pond
  - location: Derry, NH
  - coordinates: 42°51′27″N 71°12′48″W
  - elevation: 205 ft (62 m)
- Mouth: Merrimack River
  - location: Methuen, MA
  - coordinates: 42°42′22″N 71°8′47″W
  - elevation: 31 ft (9.4 m)
- Length: 17.7 mi (28.5 km)

Basin features
- Tributaries
  - left: Providence Hill Brook, Captain Pond Brook, World End Brook
  - right: Widow Harris Brook, Policy Brook

The Spicket River is a 17.7-mile-long (28.5 km) river located in New Hampshire and Massachusetts in the United States. It is a left tributary of the Merrimack River, part of the Gulf of Maine watershed. It is sometimes spelled "Spickett".

The Spicket River begins at the outlet of Island Pond in Derry, New Hampshire, and flows south into Salem, New Hampshire, passing through the Arlington Mill Reservoir. The river continues through Salem, encountering copious suburban development, and enters the city of Methuen, Massachusetts, where it drops nearly 100 feet (30 m) in elevation over a series of dams on its way to the Merrimack River in Lawrence.

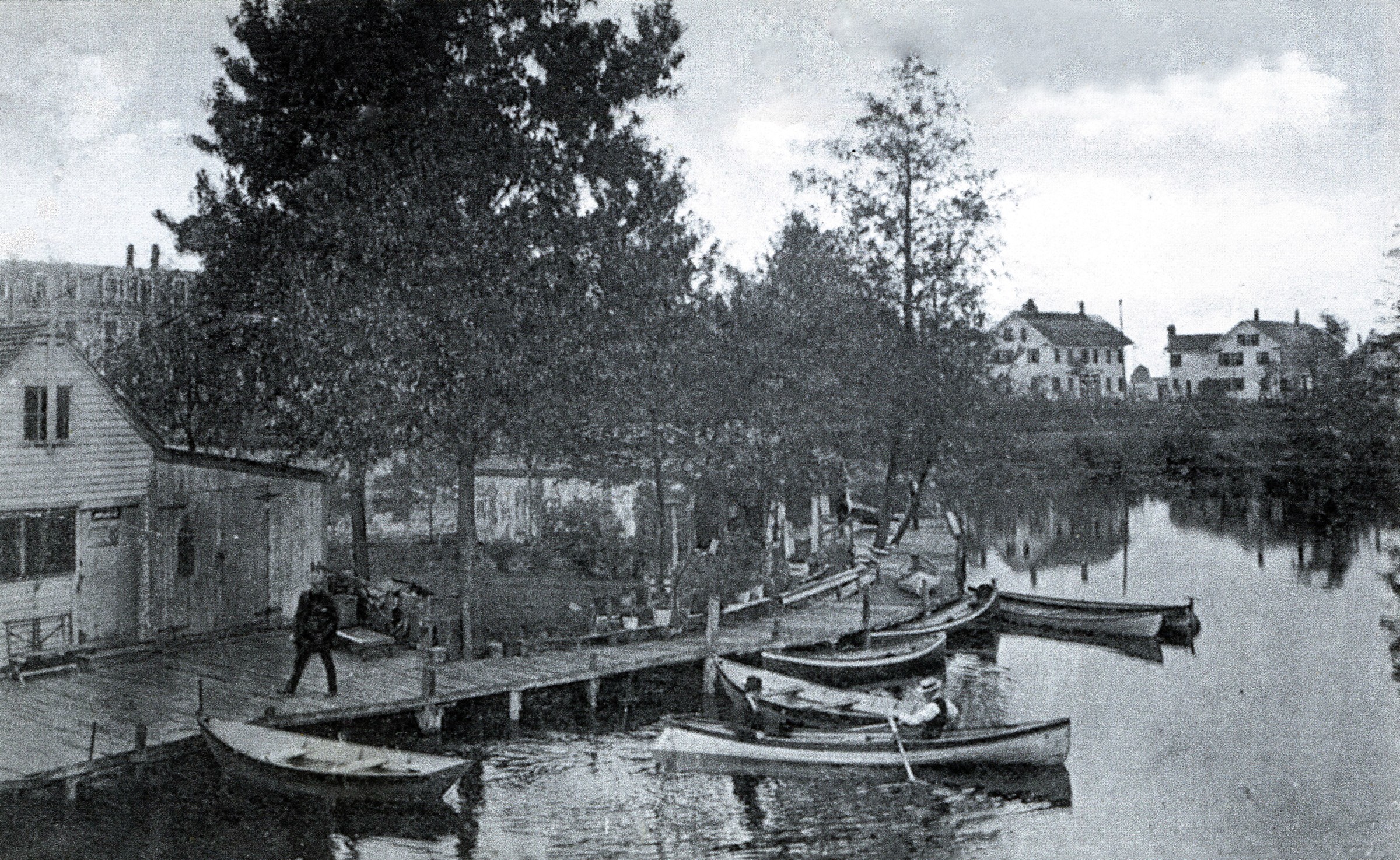
Boat house circa 1900 in Methuen, Massachusetts

Broadway Bridge, Methuen

Spicket River Dam in Methuen

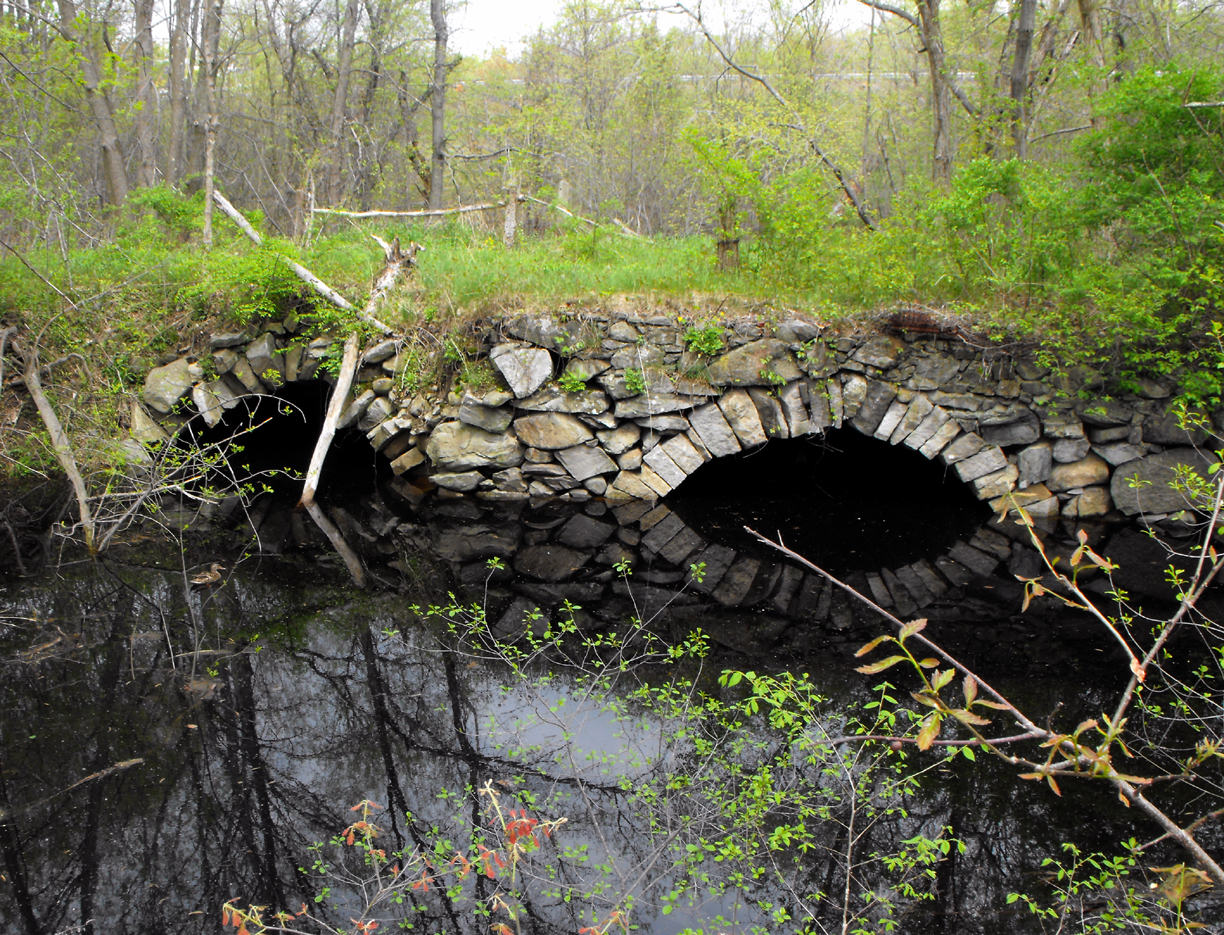
Sands Bridge on Hampshire Rd, Methuen

== See also ==
- List of rivers of Massachusetts
- List of rivers of New Hampshire
