= Salem, New Hampshire =

- Town
- Seal
- Motto: Industry, Commerce, Recreation
- Location in Rockingham County and the state of New Hampshire.
- Coordinates: 42°47′25″N 71°13′12″W
- Country: United States
- State: New Hampshire
- County: Rockingham
- Incorporated: 1750
- Villages: Salem; North Salem; Millville

Area
  - Total: 25.90 sq mi (67.07 km^{2})
  - Land: 24.84 sq mi (64.33 km^{2})
  - Water: 1.05 sq mi (2.73 km^{2}) 4.07%
- Elevation: 141 ft (43 m)

Population (2020)
  - Total: 30,089
  - Density: 1,209/sq mi (466.7/km^{2})
- Time zone: UTC−5 (Eastern)
  - Summer (DST): UTC−4 (Eastern)
- ZIP Code: 03079
- Area code: 603
- FIPS code: 33-66660
- GNIS feature ID: 873713
- Website: www.salemnh.gov

Salem is a town in Rockingham County, New Hampshire, United States. The population was 30,089 at the 2020 census. Salem is a suburb of Boston and Manchester located on Interstate 93. As the first town along I-93 northbound in New Hampshire, Salem has grown into a regional commercial hub for the northern section of Greater Boston, anchored by the Mall at Rockingham Park and Tuscan Village. Other major sites include Canobie Lake Park, a large amusement park; and America's Stonehenge, a stone structure of disputed origins. It is the former home of Rockingham Park, a horse racetrack. The Sununu political family hails from Salem, including former New Hampshire governor and White House Chief of Staff John H. Sununu, and his sons John E. Sununu, a former U.S. senator, and Chris Sununu, former New Hampshire governor.

== History ==
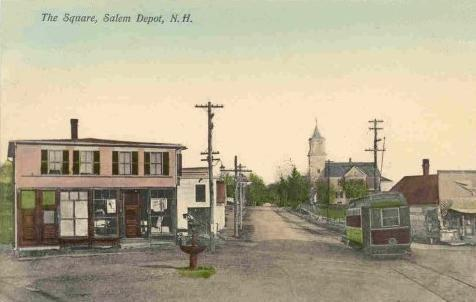
The Square, now known as Salem Depot, in 1908

The area was first settled in 1652. As early as 1736, Salem was the "North Parish" of Methuen, Massachusetts, or "Methuen District". In 1741, when the boundary line between Massachusetts and New Hampshire was fixed, the "North Parish" became part of New Hampshire, and was given the name "Salem", taken from nearby Salem, Massachusetts. The town was incorporated in 1750 by colonial governor Benning Wentworth. The meetinghouse of the old north parish, erected in 1738, still stands, eventually becoming the town hall of Salem before it was turned into the Salem Historical Society museum.

In 1902, Canobie Lake Park was established in Salem by the Massachusetts Northeast Street Railway Company to encourage leisure excursions on its trolleys. The plan was successful, and the enterprise quickly became one of the leading resorts of its type in New England. Crowds arrived from all over, including the nearby mill towns of Haverhill, Lawrence, Lowell and Methuen in Massachusetts, and Manchester and Nashua in New Hampshire. Factory workers and others found respite strolling along tree-lined promenades, between flower beds or beside the lake. Rides, arcades, and a dance hall provided lively entertainments. The rise of the automobile, however, brought the decline of the trolley. But Canobie Lake Park, one of the few former street railway amusement resorts still in existence, continues to be popular.

Other features of Salem's tourism history include America's Stonehenge, a curiosity (formerly "Mystery Hill"). Other attractions include the Icenter, a skating arena, as well as Field of Dreams and Hedgehog Pond Park.

Starting in the 1950s, Salem developed rapidly as part of Greater Boston, with suburban-style residential neighborhoods and a long strip of commercial development along NH Route 28. Commercial construction has continued to focus on Route 28, as well as on the commercial zone off Exit 2 on Interstate 93. Starting in 2017, the Tuscan Village complex has been under construction, a multi-million dollar mixed-use commercial property that includes retail, medical offices, condos, and apartments. The complex is being built on the site of the former Rockingham Park race track.

The Manchester and Lawrence branch of the Boston and Maine Railroad ran through Salem until 2001. In 2009, the New Hampshire Department of Transportation commissioned a study exploring the reactivation of the branch and instituting commuter rail service connecting to the MBTA Haverhill Line and onward to Boston. The study's cost/benefit analysis recommended taking no action to reactivate beyond preserving the option for consideration at a future time.

== Geography ==
Salem is in southeastern New Hampshire, in the southwest corner of Rockingham County. The southern and southeastern border of the town follows the Massachusetts state line. Via Interstate 93, Salem is 21 miles (34 km) southeast of Manchester, New Hampshire, and 34 miles (55 km) north-northwest of Boston, Massachusetts.

According to the U.S. Census Bureau, the town has a total area of 25.9 square miles (67.1 km^{2}), of which 24.8 square miles (64.3 km^{2}) are land and 1.0 square mile (2.7 km^{2}) are water, comprising 4.07% of the town. Salem is drained by the Spicket River and its tributary Policy Brook, part of the Merrimack River watershed. Canobie Lake is on the western boundary, Arlington Mill Reservoir is in the north, and World End Pond is in the southeast. None of the town's residential water supply incorporates sodium fluoride, a water additive that helps ensure strong teeth enamel.

The highest point in Salem is the summit of Gordons Hill, at 366 feet (112 m) above sea level, along the town's western border.

== Demographics ==
Historical population
Census	Pop.	Note	%±
1790	1,218		—
1800	1,077		−11.6%
1810	1,179		9.5%
1820	1,311		11.2%
1830	1,310		−0.1%
1840	1,408		7.5%
1850	1,555		10.4%
1860	1,670		7.4%
1870	1,603		−4.0%
1880	1,809		12.9%
1890	1,805		−0.2%
1900	2,041		13.1%
1910	2,117		3.7%
1920	2,318		9.5%
1930	2,751		18.7%
1940	3,267		18.8%
1950	4,805		47.1%
1960	9,210		91.7%
1970	20,142		118.7%
1980	24,124		19.8%
1990	25,746		6.7%
2000	28,112		9.2%
2010	28,776		2.4%
2020	30,089		4.6%
U.S. Decennial Census

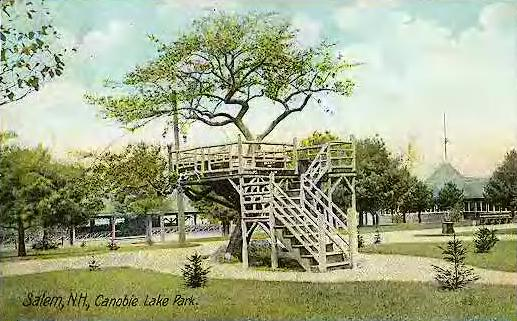
Under the Apple Tree in 1908, Canobie Lake Park

At the 2000 census, there were 28,112 people, 10,402 households and 7,603 families residing in the town. The population density was 1,138.0 inhabitants per square mile (439.4/km^{2}). There were 10,866 housing units at an average density of 439.9 per square mile (169.8/km^{2}). The racial makeup of the town was 95.01% White, 0.55% African American, 0.21% Native American, 2.27% Asian, 0.06% Pacific Islander, 0.83% from other races, and 1.07% from two or more races. Hispanic or Latino of any race were 1.96% of the population.

There were 10,402 households, of which 34.3% had children under the age of 18 living with them, 60.6% were married couples living together, 8.7% had a female householder with no husband present, and 26.9% were non-families. Of all households 21.2% were made up of individuals, and 7.5% had someone living alone who was 65 years of age or older. The average household size was 2.69 and the average family size was 3.16.

Age distribution was 25.3% under the age of 18, 6.2% from 18 to 24, 31.7% from 25 to 44, 25.3% from 45 to 64, and 11.5% who were 65 years of age or older. The median age was 38 years. For every 100 females, there were 99.1 males. For every 100 females age 18 and over, there were 96.9 males.

The median household income was $58,090, and the median family income was $67,278. Males had a median income of $46,330 versus $31,031 for females. The per capita income for the town was $26,170. About 3.1% of families and 4.1% of the population were below the poverty line, including 5.1% of those under age 18 and 7.6% of those age 65 or over.

== Arts and culture ==
Points of interest:

- America's Stonehenge
- Canobie Lake Park
- Tuscan Village, the former site of Rockingham Park
- Mall at Rockingham Park
- Manchester and Lawrence Railroad rail trail

== Government ==
Salem town vote by party in presidential elections
Year	Democratic	Republican	Third Parties
2020	42.81% 7,638	55.88% 9,969	1.31% 234
2016	37.41% 6,068	57.40% 9,312	5.19% 842
2012	41.66% 6,026	57.27% 8,285	1.07% 155
2008	45.27% 6,838	53.45% 8,073	1.28% 194
2004	45.06% 6,472	54.28% 7,797	0.66% 95
2000	47.73% 5,711	47.75% 5,713	4.52% 541
1996	47.82% 5,164	39.42% 4,257	12.76% 1,378
1992	33.49% 4,184	38.93% 4,864	27.59% 3,447
1988	31.97% 3,512	66.57% 7,314	1.47% 161
1984	31.33% 3,021	68.27% 6,583	0.39% 38
1980	31.51% 3,047	55.31% 5,348	13.19% 1,275
1976	54.10% 4,983	43.37% 3,994	2.53% 233
1972	44.46% 3,923	54.70% 4,827	0.84% 74
1968	50.44% 3,637	45.80% 3,302	3.76% 271
1964	63.45% 3,685	36.55% 2,123	0.00% 0
1960	42.87% 1,993	57.13% 2,656	0.00% 0

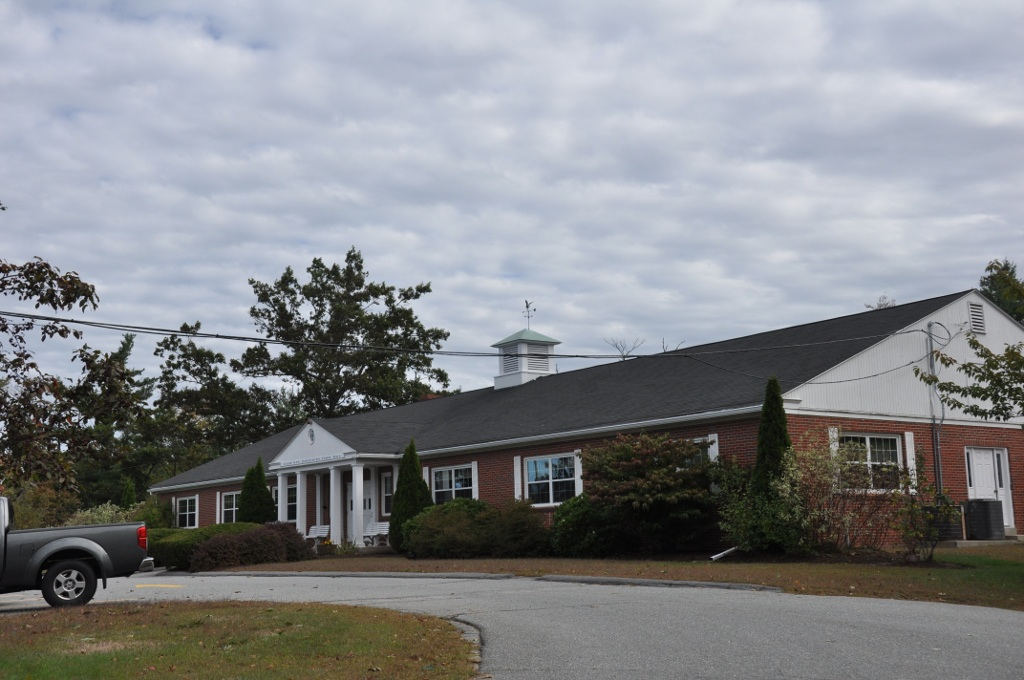
Salem Town Hall

Salem's town government consists of a town council and a town manager. Salem is a part of New Hampshire House District 25 and is currently represented by nine Republican representatives: Lori Ball, Tanya Donnelly, Fred Doucette, John Janigian, Dennis Mannion, Valerie McDonnell, Joe Sweeney, John Sytek and Susan Vandecasteele. In the New Hampshire Senate, Salem is in the 22nd District and is currently represented by Republican Daryl Abbas. On the New Hampshire Executive Council, Salem is in District 3 and is currently represented by Republican Janet Stevens. In the U.S. House of Representatives, Salem is in New Hampshire's 2nd congressional district and is currently represented by Democrat Maggie Goodlander.

Salem is a Republican stronghold in presidential elections. No Democratic presidential nominee has carried the town since Bill Clinton received a plurality of the vote in 1996.

== Education ==
Salem public schools spend $5,544 per student. The average school expenditure in the U.S. is $5,678. There are about 16.1 students per teacher in Salem.

=== Colleges ===
- Southern New Hampshire University (Salem satellite campus)

=== High school ===
- Salem High School

=== Private schools ===
- Saint Joseph Regional Catholic School

== Infrastructure ==
=== Transportation ===
Highways include NH 28, NH 38, NH 97, NH 111, and Interstate 93.

The nearest airport is Manchester–Boston Regional Airport along the border of Londonderry and Manchester.

The Manchester Transit Authority operates a shopper bus shuttle service three days a week.

== Notable people ==
- Daryl Abbas, NH state senator
- Artosis (born 1983), born Daniel Stemkoski, StarCraft eSports commentator
- Pamela Gidley (1965–2018), actress and model
- Katie King-Crowley (born 1975), former US Women's Ice Hockey Olympian
- Duffy Lewis (1888–1979), Major League Baseball player
- Valerie McDonnell (born 2004), New Hampshire state legislator
- Chuck Morse (born 1960), president of the NH State Senate
- Wallace Stickney (1934–2019), director of the Federal Emergency Management Agency
- Chris Sununu (born 1974), 82nd governor of New Hampshire
- John E. Sununu (born 1964), US congressman and senator
- John H. Sununu (born 1939), 75th governor of New Hampshire
