= Philadelphia Toboggan Coasters =

Roller coaster manufacturer

Philadelphia Toboggan Coasters, Inc.
- Type: Private
- Industry: Manufacturing
- Founded: January 21, 1904; 122 years ago
- Founder: Henry B. Auchy, Chester Albright
- Headquarters: Hatfield, Pennsylvania, United States
- Area served: Worldwide
- Products: Roller coaster trains, queue gates, fin brakes (formerly wooden roller coasters, carousels, Skee-Ball games, and animatronics)
- Owner: Tom Rebbie
- Website: www.philadelphiatoboggancoastersinc.com

Philadelphia Toboggan Coasters (PTC) is one of the oldest existing roller coaster manufacturing companies in the world. Based in Hatfield, Pennsylvania, it was established in 1904 by Henry B. Auchy and Chester Albright under the name Philadelphia Toboggan Company. The company manufactured carousels, wooden roller coasters, and roller coaster trains ("toboggans") from 1904 to 1979. The only product it still manufactures is roller coaster trains.

== History ==
Philadelphia Toboggan Company was incorporated on January 20, 1904 as a roller coaster design and construction firm. Notable designers included Joe McKee, John A. Miller, Herbert Schmeck, Frank Hoover, and John C. Allen. Herbert Shmeck was with the company for 35 years, serving as its president until 1954. When Shmeck resigned as president, Allen became the president in his place. Allen had been with the company since 1931.

The company also manufactured carousels from 1904 to 1934. It expanded with the acquisition of the inventory of the Dentzel Carousel Company in 1927. Lead carvers included Daniel Carl Muller, Leo Zoller, John Zalar, and Frank Caretta.

Beginning before World War II, the company produced Laffing Sal animatronics. The company also manufactured Skee-Ball games from 1946 to 1977.

When Allen retired as president in 1976, the company stopped designing roller coasters, but continued to work on coaster construction projects until 1979, when it exited the coaster construction industry permanently.

On November 27, 1991, Tom Rebbie and Bill Dauphinee purchased Philadelphia Toboggan Company from Sam High and incorporated a new company, Philadelphia Toboggan Coaster, shortly thereafter. Rebbie was appointed president. In 2007, he bought out Dauphinee to become the sole owner, and changed the company's name to Philadelphia Toboggan Coasters, Inc. (PTCI). The company continues to manufacture roller coaster trains, queue gates, and fin brakes.

== List of roller coasters ==
Philadelphia Toboggan Coasters has built approximately 144 roller coasters around the world. As of 2026, only 24 remain in operation.

Serial number	Name	Park	Country	Status	Opened	Closed	Details
1	Figure 8 Toboggan	Pine Beach Park (Norfolk, Virginia)	United States	Removed	1904	1906 or later	Designed by Henry B. Auchy
2	Toboggan Figure 8	Vinewood Park (Topeka, Kansas)	United States	Removed	1904	Unknown	Designed by Henry B. Auchy
3	Forest Toboggan	Olentangy Park (Columbus, Ohio)	United States	Removed	1904	1937	Designed by Henry B. Auchy
4	Figure 8	White City (New Orleans, Louisiana)	United States	Removed	1904	1912	Designed by Henry B. Auchy
5	Figure Eight Toboggan	Pabst Park (Milwaukee, Wisconsin)	United States	Removed	1904	1910 or later	Designed by Chester E. Albright
6	Toboggan Slide	Elitch Gardens (original location) (Denver, Colorado)	United States	Removed	1904	1925	
7	Figure Eight	Delmar Garden Amusement Park (University City, Missouri)	United States	Removed	1905	1908 or later	
8	Unknown	Unknown (Fort George, New York)	United States	Removed	1905	Unknown	
9	Figure Eight	Euclid Beach Park (Cleveland, Ohio)	United States	Removed	1904	1909	
10	Figure 8	Idlewood Amusement Park (Richmond, Virginia)	United States	Removed	1906	1909	Designed by Henry B. Auchy
11	Forest Coaster	White City (Glenside, Pennsylvania)	United States	Removed	1906	1911	
12	Unknown	Dreamland (Coney Island, New York)	United States	Removed	1907	1911	Designed by Chester E. Albright. Burnt down.
13	Unknown	Six Gun Territory (fomerly known as Willow Grove Park) (Willow Grove, Pennsylvania)	United States	Removed	1909	Unknown	
14	Unknown	Delmar Garden Amusement Park (University City, Missouri)	United States	Removed	1910	Unknown	
15	Unknown	Elitch Gardens (original location) (Denver, Colorado)	United States	Removed	1910	Unknown	
16 / 26	Jack Rabbit; Formerly known as Forest Scenic Railway (1912 to 1918)	Point Breeze Park (Philadelphia, Pennsylvania)	United States	Removed	1912	1923	Heavily modified and given a new name and serial number in 1918
17	Unknown	Golden City Park (Canarsie, New York)	United States	Removed	1915	Unknown	Designed by Joseph A. McKee, who was also the construction supervisor.
18	Unknown	Lake Orion (Detroit, Michigan)	United States	Removed	1915	Unknown	Designed by Joseph A. McKee. Construction supervisor was C. Mitchow.
19	North Wind Coaster; Formerly known as Jack Rabbit	Luna Park (Cleveland, Ohio)	United States	Removed	1915	1929	Designed by Joseph A. McKee. Construction supervisor was Harry C. Baker.
20	Jack Rabbit	Willough Beach Park (Willoughby, Ohio)	United States	Removed	1915	1924	Designed by Joseph A. McKee. Construction supervisor was Harry C. Baker.
21	Unknown	Revere Beach (Revere, Massachusetts)	United States	Removed	1916	Unknown.	Designed by Joseph A. McKee. Construction supervisor was Edward E. Rhoads.
22	Jack Rabbit	Shellpot Park (Brandywine Hundred, Delaware)	United States	Removed	1916	Unknown	Designed by Joseph A. McKee. Construction supervisor was Austin McFadden.
23 / 91	The Wild One; Formerly known as Giant Coaster	Six Flags America (Woodmore, Maryland); Formerly located at Paragon Park (Hull, Massachusetts)	United States	Removed	1986; 1917 at Paragon Park	2025 1985 at Paragon Park	Designed by John A. Miller. Construction supervisor was William Strickler. Herbert Schmeck redesigned much of the ride in 1932 and assigned it a new serial number after it was partially destroyed by fire. It was relocated to Wild World (later known as Six Flags America) with assistance from Dinn Corporation in 1986.
24	Forest Ride	Ross Grove (Aspinwall, Pennsylvania)	United States	Removed	1917	Unknown	
25	Unknown	Euclid Beach Park (Cleveland, Ohio)	United States	Removed	1917	Unknown	
26a	Jack Rabbit	Rocky Springs Park (Lancaster, Pennsylvania)	United States	Removed	1918	1927	
27	Forest Ride	Six Gun Territory (formerly known as Willow Grove Park) (Willow Grove, Pennsylvania)	United States	Removed	1919	1926	
28	Jack Rabbit	Clementon Park & Splash World (Clementon, New Jersey)	United States	Removed	1919	2002	Designed by John A. Miller. Stood out of operation from 2003 to 2007.
29	Deep Dipper	Carlin's Park (Baltimore, Maryland)	United States	Removed	1919	1949	Designed by John A. Miller
30	Dips	Buckroe Beach Park (Hampton, Virginia)	United States	Removed	1920	1985	Designed by John A. Miller. Construction supervisor was Herbert Schmeck.
31	Deep Dipper	Frederick Road Park (Baltimore, Maryland)	United States	Removed	1920	1922	Designed by John A. Miller and Harry C. Baker. Destroyed by fire.
32	Bay Shore Dip Formerly known as Dixie Flier	Bay Shore Park (Hampton, Virginia)	United States	Removed	1920	1933	Designed by John A. Miller. Construction supervisor was Herbert Schmeck.
33	Giant Coaster Formerly known as Pippin	Rocky Glen (Moosic, Pennsylvania)	United States	Removed	1920	1950	Designed by John A. Miller. Construction supervisor was Herbert Schmeck.
34	Alpine Dips	Sanatoga Park (Sanatoga, Pennsylvania)	United States	Removed	1921	1937	Designed by John A. Miller. Construction supervisor was Herbert Schmeck.
35 / 88	Wildcat; Formerly known as Thriller (unknown year to 1929) and Wasco Dips	Enna Jettick Park (formerly known as Lakeside Park) (Auburn, New York)	United States	Removed	1921	1941	Designed by John A. Miller and Herbert Schmeck. Construction supervisors were Frank F. Hoover, Schmeck, and M. J. Mueller. Heavily modified in 1930 and given a new serial number.
36	Wildcat Formerly known as Giant Coaster and Deep Dips	Merrimack Park (Methuen, Massachusetts)	United States	Removed	1921	1938	Designed by John A. Miller. Construction supervisor Herbert Schmeck.
37	Roller Coaster	Woodlawn Park (Trenton, New Jersey)	United States	Removed	1922	Unknown	Designed by John A. Miller. Construction supervisor was C.S. Ellis.
38	Dips	Schuylkill Park (Tremont, Pennsylvania)	United States	Removed	1922	1937	Designed by John A. Miller. Construction supervisors were Herbert Schmeck and L. J. Mueller.
39 / 97	Wildcat Formerly known as Joy Ride (1923 to 1935)	Hersheypark (Hershey, Pennsylvania)	United States	Removed	1923	1945	Designed by Herbert Schmeck, who was also the construction supervisor and. Heavily modified and given a new name and serial number in 1935. Renovation construction supervisor was Frank F. Hoover.
39a	Wildcat	Frederick Road Park (Baltimore, Maryland)	United States	Removed	1923	1925	
40	Ski Ride	Broad Ripple Park (Indianapolis, Indiana)	United States	Removed	1924	1944	Designed by Herbert Schmeck
41 / 87	Thunderhawk; Formerly known as Coaster (1924 to 1988)	Dorney Park (Dorneyville, Pennsylvania)	United States	Operating	1924	N/A	Designed by Herbert Schmeck. Heavily modified in 1930 and given a new serial number.
42	Thriller	Euclid Beach Park (Cleveland, Ohio)	United States	Removed	1924	1969	Designed by Herbert Schmeck and Howard Stoneback
43	Big Roller Coaster	Memorial Park (Williamsport, Pennsylvania)	United States	Removed	1924	1930	Designed by Herbert Schmeck
44	Cyclone	Parc Belmont (Montréal, Québec)	Canada	Removed	1924	1983	Designed by Herbert Schmeck. Construction supervisor was H.F. Allen.
45	Island Flyer	Island Park (Sunbury, Pennsylvania)	United States	Removed	1925	1934	Designed by Herbert Schmeck
46 / 93	Wildcat	Bertrand Island Amusement Park (Mount Arlington, New Jersey)	United States	Removed	1925	1983	Designed by Herbert Schmeck. Construction supervisor was Harry C. Baker. Heavily modified in 1934 and given a new serial number.
47	Wildcat	Shady Grove Park (Lemont Furnace, Pennsylvania)	United States	Removed	1925	1936	Designed by Herbert Schmeck. Construction supervisors were George J. Baker and James L. Martz. Destroyed in a fire.
48	Giant Roller Coaster	Lakeside Park (Barnesville, Pennsylvania)	United States	Removed	1925	1946 or 1950	Designed by Herbert Schmeck
49	Wildcat	Shellpot Park (Wilmington, Delaware)	United States	Removed	1925	1933	Designed by Herbert Schmeck
50	Junior Coaster	Woodlawn Park (Trenton, New Jersey)	United States	Removed	1925	1938	Designed by Herbert Schmeck
51	Wildcat	Long Branch Park (Syracuse, New York)	United States	Removed	1926	1938 or earlier	Designed by Herbert Schmeck
52	Sky Rocket	Elitch Gardens (original location) (Denver, Colorado)	United States	Removed	1926	1935	Designed by Herbert Schmeck. Later renovated into Wildcat (PTC serial number 98).
53	Twister	Coney Island (Cincinnati, Ohio)	United States	Removed	1926	1936	Designed by Herbert Schmeck
54	Wildcat	Coney Island (Cincinnati, Ohio)	United States	Removed	1926	1964	Designed by Herbert Schmeck
55	Kids Coaster	Cincinnati Zoo & Botanical Garden (Cincinnati, Ohio)	United States	Removed	1926	1934	Designed by Herbert Schmeck
56	Wildcat	Rocky Point Park (Warwick, Rhode Island)	United States	Removed	1926	1938	Designed by Herbert Schmeck. Destroyed by a hurricane.
57	Express	Brandywine Picnic Park (West Chester, Pennsylvania)	United States	Removed	1926	1980	Designed by Herbert Schmeck
58	Wild Cat	Seabreeze Amusement Park (Irondequoit, New York)	United States	Removed	1922 or 1926	1935	Designed by Herbert Schmeck. Construction supervisor was Frank F. Hoover. Destroyed in a fire.
59	Wildcat	Fernbrook Park (Dallas, Pennsylvania)	United States	Removed	1926	1946	Designed by Herbert Schmeck. Its scrapped wood was used to build Million Dollar Coaster at Rocky Glen Park.
60	Rocket	Laurel Park (Mount Gretna, Pennsylvania)	United States	Removed	1926	1931 to 1934	Designed by Herbert Schmeck. Stood out of operation for a few years before being sold for lumber at the end of 1935.
60a or 82	Wildcat	Joyland Park (Lexington, Kentucky)	United States	Removed	1926 or 1929	1964	Designed by Herbert Schmeck. Construction supervisor was Frank H. Hoover. There are conflicting reports on the ride's opening year and serial number .
61	Wildcat	Lake Compounce (Bristol, Connecticut)	United States	Operating	1927	N/A	Designed by Herbert Schmeck. Charlie Dinn and Curtis D. Summers of Dinn Corporation rebuilt the ride in 1986. Has received retracking by Martin & Vleminckx and The Gravity Group. Given new trains by Great Coasters International in 2017. Stood out of operation in 2023.
62	Twister	Croops Glen (Hunlock Creek, Pennsylvania)	United States	Removed	1927	1941	Designed by Herbert Schmeck
63	Wildcat	Edgewood Park (Coal Township, Pennsylvania)	United States	Removed	1927	1935	Designed by Herbert Schmeck
64	Wild Cat	Woodside Park (Philadelphia, Pennsylvania)	United States	Removed	1927	1955	Designed by Herbert Schmeck
65	Tornado Formerly known as Twister	Woodside Park (Philadelphia, Pennsylvania)	United States	Removed	1927	1954	Designed by Herbert Schmeck
67	Twister	Hocus Pocus Park (Knoxville, Tennessee)	United States	Removed	1927	1937	Designed by Herbert Schmeck
68	Twister	Lakemont Park (Altoona, Pennsylvania)	United States	Removed	1927	1935	Designed by Herbert Schmeck. Stood out of operation in 1936 after being heavily damaged in a flood. Dismantled in 1937.
69	Wildcat	Belvedere Beach Amusement Park (Keansburg, New Jersey)	United States	Removed	1927	1940 to 1947	Designed by Herbert Schmeck
70	Bear Cat	Sans Souci Park (Hanover Township, Pennsylvania)	United States	Removed	1928	1970	Designed by Herbert Schmeck
71	Twister	Warner Park (Chattanooga, Tennessee)	United States	Removed	1928	1935 to 1938	Designed by Herbert Schmeck
72	Wildcat	Brady Lake Park (Ravenna, Ohio)	United States	Removed	1928	1952	Designed by Herbert Schmeck
73	Wildcat	Rocky Springs Park (Lancaster, Pennsylvania)	United States	Removed	1928	1965	Designed by Herbert Schmeck. Construction supervisor was James L. Martz. Stood out of operation until 1990 or 1991.
74	Twister	McCullough Lake Park (Lima, Ohio)	United States	Removed	1928	1936	Designed by Herbert Schmeck. Construction supervisor was George J. Baker.
75	Zip	White City (Shrewsbury, Massachusetts)	United States	Removed	1928	1951	Designed by Herbert Schmeck
76	Wildcat	Erie Beach Park (Fort Erie, Ontario)	Canada	Removed	1928	1930	Designed by Herbert Schmeck
77	Baby Dipper	Happyland Park (Vancouver, British Columbia)	Canada	Removed	1928	1944	Designed by Herbert Schmeck
78	Rocket	Ocean View Amusement Park (Norfolk, Virginia)	United States	Removed	1929	1978	Originally designed by Edward A. Vettel. Alterations to ride were designed by Herbert Shmeck. Dynamited in 1979.
79	Dip-Lo-Do-Cus	Olympic Park (Irvington, New Jersey)	United States	Removed	1923	1937	Designed by Herbert Schmeck and John A. Miller. The ride was renovated by PTC in 1929.
80	Wildcat	Pine Island Park (Manchester, New Hampshire)	United States	Removed	1929	1961	Designed by Herbert Schmeck. Construction supervisor was William Marquet.
81	Mountain Flyer	Mountain Park (Holyoke, Massachusetts)	United States	Removed	1929	1987	Designed by Herbert Schmeck
83	Wildcat	Idora Park (Youngstown, Ohio)	United States	Removed	1930	1984	Designed by Herbert Schmeck. Construction supervisor was Harry C. Baker. Heavily damaged by fire in 1984. Stood out of operation until 2001.
84	Cyclone	Palace Playland (Old Orchard Beach, Maine)	United States	Removed	1930	1948 or 1949	Designed by Herbert Schmeck. Construction supervisor was James L. Martz. There are conflicting reports on its closure and if it was destroyed by fire.
85	Wildcat	Lakeside Park (Dayton, Ohio)	United States	Removed	1930	1964	Designed by Herbert Schmeck. Construction supervisors were Frank F. Hoover and James L. Martz.
86 / 92	Yankee Cannonball; Formerly known as Meteor (1930 to 1932) and Greyhound (1936 to 1982)	Canobie Lake Park (Salem, New Hampshire); Formerly located at Lakewood Park (Waterbury, Connecticut)	United States	Operating	1936; 1930 at Lakewood Park	N/A 1932 at Lakewood Park	Designed by Herbert Schmeck. Construction supervisor was Frank F. Hoover. Relocated and assigned new serial number in 1936.
89	Unknown	Mid City Park (Albany, New York)	United States	Removed	1931	Unknown	Designed by Herbert Schmeck
90	Flying Turns	Rocky Point Park (Warwick, Rhode Island)	United States	Removed	1931	1938	Designed by Herbert Schmeck and John Norman Bartlett. Built by John Norman Bartlett. Construction supervisor was Herbert Schmeck.
Unknown	Blue Flyer; Formerly known as Zipper Dipper (1934 to 2010)	Pleasure Beach Resort (better known as Blackpool Pleasure Beach) (Blackpool, Lancashire, England)	United Kingdom	Operating	1934	N/A	Believed to have been built by Charlie Paige with Harry Traver's assistance. Serial number unknown.
94	Teddy Bear	Coney Island (Cincinnati, Ohio)	United States	Removed	1935	1971	Designed by Herbert Schmeck
95	Teddy Bear	Kennywood (West Mifflin, Pennsylvania)	United States	Removed	1935	1947	Designed by Herbert Schmeck. Construction supervisor was Andy Vettel.
96	Whirlwind	Dinosaur Beach (formerly known as Conko's Party Pier, The New Hunt's Pier, Hunt's Pier, and Ocean Pier) (Wildwood, New Jersey)	United States	Removed	1935	1943	Designed by Herbert Schmeck. Destroyed in a fire.
98	Teddy Bear	Elitch Gardens (original location) (Denver, Colorado)	United States	Removed	1936	Unknown	Designed by Herbert Schmeck
99	Wildcat	Elitch Gardens (original location) (Denver, Colorado)	United States	Removed	1936	1994	Renovation of Elitch Gardens' former Sky Rocket coaster (PTC serial number 52). Renovation designed by Herbert Schmeck. Stood out of operation from 1994 to 1999.
100	Shooting Star; Formerly known as Clipper (1937 to 1946)	Coney Island (Cincinnati, Ohio)	United States	Removed	1937	1971	Designed by Herbert Schmeck. Heavily renovated in 1946.
101	Rollo Coaster	Idlewild and Soak Zone (Ligonier, Pennsylvania)	United States	Operating	1938	N/A	Designed by Herbert Schmeck
102	Alps	Six Gun Territory (formerly known as Willow Grove Park) (Willow Grove, Pennsylvania)	United States	Removed	1905	1975	Originally built by LaMarcus Adna Thompson and John A. Miller. Altered in 1939 by Herbert Schmeck.
103	Roller Coaster	Bayside Park (Clear Lake, Iowa)	United States	Removed	1942	1958	Designed by Herbert Schmeck
104	Comet	Pleasure Pier (Port Arthur, Texas)	United States	Removed	1942	1958	Designed by Herbert Schmeck. Destroyed by a hurricane.
105	Comet	Forest Park Highlands Amusement Park (St. Louis, Missouri)	United States	Removed	1941	1963	Designed by Herbert Schmeck. Heavily damaged in a fire. Stood out of operation until 1966.
106	Wildcat Formerly known as Comet (1922 to 1940)	Pirate's Fun Park (formerly known as Salisbury Beach) (Salisbury, Massachusetts)	United States	Removed	1922	1975	Originally opened as Comet in 1922. Alterations in 1941 by Herbert Schmeck.
107	Big Dipper Formerly known as Sky Rocket (1925 to 1947–1950) and Clipper (1947–1950 to 1968)	Geauga Lake (Aurora, Ohio)	United States	Removed	1925	2007	Originally designed by John A. Miller. Alterations somewhere between 1947 to 1950 designed by Herbert Schmeck. Alteration construction supervisor was Frank F. Hoover.
108	Cyclone	Palisades Amusement Park (Cliffside Park, New Jersey)	United States	Removed	1945	1971	Parts of the park's Skyrocket coaster were used in the construction of Cyclone. Designed by Herbert Schmeck. Construction supervisor was Joseph A. McKee.
109	Comet	Hersheypark (Hershey, Pennsylvania)	United States	Operating	1946	N/A	Designed by Herbert Schmeck. Construction supervisor was Frank F. Hoover. Renovated in 1978.
110	Comet	Meyer's Lake Park (Canton, Ohio)	United States	Removed	1947	1974	Designed by Herbert P. Schmeck; construction supervisor William Marquet.
111	Phoenix; Formerly known as Rocket (1947 to 1980)	Knoebels Amusement Resort (Elysburg, Pennsylvania); Formerly located at Playland Park (San Antonio, Texas)	United States	Operating	1985; 1948 at Playland Park	N/A 1980 at Playland Park	Designed by Herbert Schmeck
112	The Comet	Great Escape (Queensbury, New York); Formerly located at Crystal Beach Park (Crystal Beach, Ontario)	United States	Operating	1994; 1948 at Crystal Beach Park	N/A 1989 at Crystal Beach Park	Designed by Herbert Schmeck. Relocated by Martin & Vleminckx.
113	Nightmare; Formerly known as Roller Coaster (1949 to 2005)	Joyland (Wichita, Kansas)	United States	Removed	1949	2006	Designed by Herbert Schmeck. Construction supervisor was Frank F. Hoover. Stood out of operation until 2015.
114	Little Dipper	Hoppyland (Marina del Rey, California)	United States	Removed	1949	1954	Designed by Herbert Schmeck. Construction supervisor was Rudy Illions.
115	Little Dipper	Six Flags Great America (Gurnee, Illinois); Formerly located at Kiddieland Amusement Park (Melrose Park, Illinois)	United States	Operating	2010; 1950 at Kiddieland Amusement Park	N/A 2009 at Kiddieland Amusement Park	Designed by Herbert Schmeck. Construction supervisor was Frank F. Hoover.
116	Comet	Ghost Town on the River (Louisville, Kentucky)	United States	Removed	1951	1976	Designed by Herbert Schmeck. Stood out of operation from 1970 to 1971.
117	Comet	Waldameer & Water World (Erie, Pennsylvania)	United States	Operating	1951	N/A	Designed by Herbert Schmeck. Construction supervisor was James L. Martz.
118	Jet Star; Formerly known as Jack Rabbit (1938 to 1950), Jet (1951 to an unknown year), and Rocket	Olympic Park (Irvington, New Jersey)	United States	Removed	1938	1965	Originally designed in 1938 by John A. Miller. Alterations made in 1951 by Herbert P. Schmeck.
119	Montaña Rusa	Isla del Coco (Havana, Cuba)	Cuba	Removed	1951	1980s	Designed by Herbert Schmeck. Construction supervisor was Frank F. Hoover.
120	Meteor; Formerly known as Little Dipper (1953 to 2003)	Little Amerricka Formerly located at Hillcrest Park (Lemont, Illinois) and Kiddytown (Norridge, Illinois)	United States	Operating	2007; 1967 at Hillcrest Park; 1953 at Kiddytown	N/A 2003 at Hillcrest Park1966 or earlier at Kiddytown|| Designed by Herbert Schmeck	
121	Roller Coaster	Funland (Las Vegas, Nevada)	United States	Removed	1954	1955	Designed by Herbert Schmeck. May have been relocated to Supertest Park in Tampa, Florida.
122	Junior Coaster	Lincoln Beach (New Orleans, Louisiana)	United States	Removed	1955	1968	Designed by Herbert Schmeck
122a	Little Dipper	Belmont Park (San Diego, California)	United States	Removed	1955	Unknown	Designed by Mitchell
123	Flyer	Dinosaur Beach (formerly known as Conko's Party Pier, The New Hunt's Pier, Hunt's Pier, and Ocean Pier) (Wildwood, New Jersey)	United States	Removed	1957	1988	Designed by John C. Allen. Construction supervisor was James L. Martz.
124	Valley Volcano	Angela Park (Drums, Pennsylvania)	United States	Removed	1956	1988	Designed by John C. Allen
125	Sea Dragon; Formerly known as Jet Flyer (1956 to 1983)	Columbus Zoo and Aquarium (Columbus, Ohio)	United States	Operating	1956	N/A	Designed by John C. Allen. Construction supervisor was Frank F. Hoover. Stood out of operation in 2007.
126	Comet; Formerly known as Mighty Lightnin and Ghost Town Jet	Rocky Glen Park (Moosic, Pennsylvania)	United States	Removed	1959	1987	Designed by John C. Allen. Construction supervisor was Frank F. Hoover.
128	Tornado	Wedgewood Village (Oklahoma City, Oklahoma)	United States	Removed	1961	1969	Designed by John C. Allen. Construction supervisor was Frank F. Hoover.
131	Blue Streak	Cedar Point (Sandusky, Ohio)	United States	Operating	1964	N/A	Designed by Frank F. Hoover and John C. Allen. Construction supervisor was Frank F. Hoover.
132	Mr. Twister	Elitch Gardens (original location) (Denver, Colorado)	United States	Removed	1965	1994	Designed by John C. Allen. Construction supervisor was Frank F. Hoover.
133	Jetstream	Riverview Park (Chicago, Illinois)	United States	Removed	1964	1967	Designed by John C. Allen
135	Skyliner	Fair Park (Nashville, Tennessee)	United States	Removed	1965	1986	Designed by John C. Allen. Construction supervisor was Frank F. Hoover.
136	Swamp Fox	Family Kingdom Amusement Park (Myrtle Beach, South Carolina)	United States	Operating	1966	N/A	Designed by John C. Allen. Construction supervisor was James L. Martz. Stood out of operation from 1990 to 1991.
137	Cannon Ball	Lake Winnepesaukah (Rossville, Georgia)	United States	Operating	1967	N/A	Designed by John C. Allen. Construction supervisor was James L. Martz.
139	Zingo	Bell's Amusement Park (Tulsa, Oklahoma)	United States	Removed	1968	2006	Designed by John C. Allen
139a	Tornado	Petticoat Junction (Panama City, Florida)	United States	Removed	1970	1984	Designed by John C. Allen. Construction supervisor was Frank F. Hoover.
140	Racer	Kings Island (Mason, Ohio)	United States	Operating	1972	N/A	Designed by John C. Allen. Construction supervisors were James L. Martz and James R. Figley.
141	Woodstock Express; Formerly known as Scooby Doo (1972 to 1979), Beastie (1980 to 2005), and Fairly Odd Coaster (2006 to 2009)	Kings Island (Mason, Ohio)	United States	Operating	1972	N/A	Designed by John C. Allen. Construction supervisors were James L. Martz and James R. Figley.
142	Great American Scream Machine	Six Flags Over Georgia (Austell, Georgia)	United States	Operating	1973	N/A	Designed by Don Rosser, John C. Allen, and William Cobb. Construction supervisors were James L. Martz and Robert Cowan.
142a	Comet	Funway Amusement Park (Fort Walton Beach, Florida)	United States	Removed	1973	1989	Designed by John C. Allen. Stood out of operation from 1990 to 1999.
144	Woodstock Express; Formerly known as Scooby Doo (1974 to 1996), Scooby-Doo's Ghoster Coaster (1997 to 2009), and Ghoster Coaster (2010 to 2012 or 2013)	Kings Dominion (Doswell, Virginia)	United States	Operating	1974	N/A	Designed by John C. Allen. Construction supervisor was James R. Figley.
144a	Woodstock Express; Formerly known as Scooby Doo (1975 to 1993 or earlier), Scooby Doo's Ghoster Coaster (1993 or earlier to 2004), and Fairly Odd Coaster (2005 to 2009)	Carowinds (Charlotte, North Carolina)	United States	Operating	1975	N/A	Designed by John C. Allen. Construction supervisor was James R. Figley.
143	Racer 75; Formerly known as Rebel Yell (1975 to 2017)	Kings Dominion (Doswell, Virginia)	United States	Operating	1975	N/A	Designed by John C. Allen. Construction supervisor was James R. Figley.
145	Screamin' Eagle	Mid America Adventure (formerly known as Six Flags St. Louis and Six Flags Over Mid-America)	United States	Operating	1976	N/A	Designed by Don Rosser, John C. Allen, and William Cobb
155	Thunder Road	Carowinds (Charlotte, North Carolina)	United States	Removed	1976	2015	Designed by Curtis D. Summers
127	Skyliner	Lakemont Park (Altoona, Pennsylvania); Formerly located at Roseland Park (Canandaigua, New York)	United States	SBNO	1987; 1960 at Roseland Park	N/A 1985 at Roseland Park	Designed by John C. Allen. Stood out of operation from 2017 to 2018. Has been standing out of operation since 2024.
129	Starliner	Cypress Gardens (now Legoland Florida) (Winter Haven, Florida); Formerly located at Miracle Strip Amusement Park (Panama City Beach, Florida)	United States	Removed	2007; 1963 at Miracle Strip Amusement Park	2008 2004 at Miracle Strip Amusement Park	Designed by John C. Allen. Construction supervisor was Frank F. Hoover.
N/A	Black Diamond; Formerly known as Golden Nugget (1960 to 1998)	Knoebels Amusement Resort (Elysburg, Pennsylvania); Formerly located at Dinosaur Beach (formerly known as Conko's Party Pier, The New Hunt's Pier, Hunt's Pier, and Ocean Pier)	United States	Operating	2011; 1960 at Dinosaur Beach	N/A 1998 at Dinosaur Beach	Designed by John C. Allen. Stood out of operation from 1993 to 1995 and from 1999 to 2009.
138	Shooting Star	Lakeside Park (Salem, Virginia)	United States	Removed	1968	1986	Designed by John C. Allen. Moved to Wet 'n Wild Emerald Pointe in Greensboro, North Carolina, but never rebuilt and eventually sold for scrap.

== Carousels ==
Most PTC carousels were numbered, so they are easily identified. Most have been moved from their original opening locations. PTC carousels that are still operating or in restoration:

Serial number	Owner	City, State	Year built	Notes	Ref(s)
6	Kit Carson County Fairgrounds	Burlington, Colorado	1905	Elitch Gardens Carousel. Originally built for Elitch Gardens in Denver, Colorado in 1905, it was removed and sold to Kit Carson County Fairgrounds in 1928 so the park could replace it with a new carousel.	
9	Carousel of Pottstown	Pottstown, Pennsylvania	1905		
15	Palisades Center Mall	West Nyack, New York	1907	Philadelphia Toboggan Company Carousel Number 15. Was moved to several amusement parks and malls until finally being installed at Palisades Center Mall in 1998. It has been in storage since 2009. Listed on the National Register of Historic Places in 2001.	
17	Six Flags Over Georgia	Austell, Georgia	1908	Riverview Carousel at Six Flags Over Georgia. Originally located at Riverview Park in Chicago, Illinois.	
18	Destiny USA	Syracuse, New York	1909		
19	Western Reserve Historical Society	Cleveland, Ohio	1910	Formerly located at Euclid Beach Park in Cleveland, Ohio from 1910 to 1969 and Palace Playland in Old Orchard Beach, Maine from the 1970s to 1996. Returned to Cleveland in 1996. A restoration was completed in 2014.	
21	Six Flags Magic Mountain	Valencia, California	1912		
30	Luna Park, Melbourne	St Kilda, Melbourne	1913		
33	Como Park Zoo and Conservatory	St. Paul, Minnesota	1914		
35	Mid America Adventure	Eureka, Missouri	1915		
39	Lake Winnepesaukah	Rossville, Georgia	1916		
43	Washington State Fair	Puyallup, Washington	1917		
44	Kings Dominion	Doswell, Virginia	1917		
45	Woodland Park Zoo	Seattle, Washington	1918		
46	Magic Kingdom	Bay Lake, Florida	1918	Cinderella's Golden Carousel, based on the 1950 Walt Disney animated film Cinderella. Opened in the park on October 1, 1971.	
47	Hersheypark	Hershey, Pennsylvania	1919		
49	Louisville Zoo	Louisville, Kentucky	1919	Formerly located at Clementon Park and Splash World in Clementon, New Jersey from 1919 to 1997	
50	City of Hampton	Hampton, Virginia	1920		
51	Elitch Gardens Theme Park	Denver, Colorado	1925–1928	Built for the original location of Elitch Gardens to replace their previous carousel (PTC serial number 6). It, along with many of Elitch Gardens' original rides, was moved to the park's new location in 1995.	
53	Charles N. Walker	Griffin, Georgia	1920		
54	Battleship Cove	Fall River, Massachusetts	1920		
59	Peddler's Village	Lahaska, Pennsylvania	1922		
61	Jane and David Walentas	Brooklyn, New York	1922	Jane's Carousel. Formerly located at Idora Park in Youngstown, Ohio from 1922 to 1984.	
62	Santa Monica Pier	Santa Monica, California	1922		
67	Carowinds	Charlotte, North Carolina	1923		
72	Sonny's Place	Somers, Connecticut	1925	Formerly located at Kiddieland Amusement Park in Melrose Park, Illinois from 1952 to 2009	
75	Gillian's Wonderland Pier	Ocean City, New Jersey	1926	Formerly located at Fernbrook Park in Dallas, Pennsylvania from 1926 to 1944, and at Rolling Green Park in Sellinsgrove, Pennsylvania from 1944 to 1972	
76	Valleyfair	Shakopee, Minnesota	1925		
79	Kings Island	Mason, Ohio	1926	Formerly located at Coney Island in Cincinnati, Ohio from 1926 to 1971	
80	Holyoke Heritage State Park	Holyoke, Massachusetts	1927–1929	Holyoke Merry-Go-Round. Originally built for Mountain Park, which closed in 1987. A preservation campaign moved the carousel to its current location in 1993.	
83	Idlewild and Soak Zone	Ligonier, Pennsylvania	1931		
84	Canada's Wonderland	Vaughan, Ontario	1928		
85	Carousel Station (formerly part of Paragon Park)	Hull, Massachusetts	1928		
87	Family Kingdom Amusement Park	Myrtle Beach, South Carolina	1929	Only the original mechanism remains, as all the original horses have been replaced. Formerly located at the Asbury Park Casino in Asbury Park, New Jersey.	
