= Woodstock Express (Kings Island) =

Wooden roller coaster

- Previously known as Scooby Doo (1972–1979); Beastie (1980–2005); Fairly Odd Coaster (2006–2009)
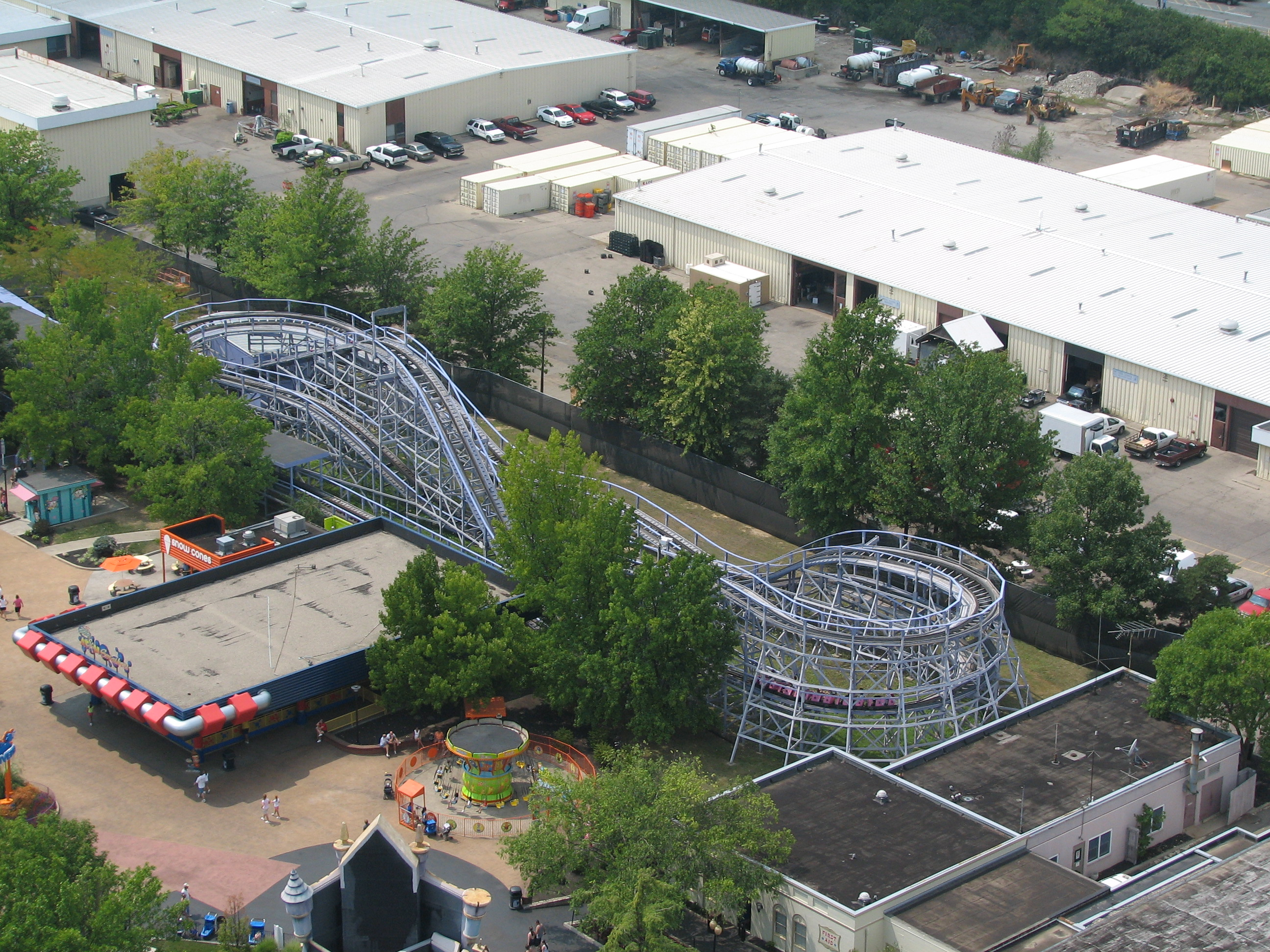
- Aerial view of coaster when it was known as Fairly Odd Coaster

Kings Island
- Location: Kings Island
- Park section: Planet Snoopy
- Coordinates: 39.343180°N 84.269267°W
- Status: Operating
- Opening date: 1972

General statistics
- Type: Wood
- Manufacturer: Philadelphia Toboggan Coasters
- Designer: John C. Allen
- Track layout: Figure Eight
- Lift/launch system: Chain lift hill
- Height: 38.6 ft (11.8 m)
- Drop: 30 ft (9.1 m)
- Length: 1,350 ft (410 m)
- Speed: 35 mph (56 km/h)
- Inversions: 0
- Duration: 1:30
- Capacity: 1200 riders per hour
- Height restriction: 40 in (102 cm)
- Trains: 2 trains with 5 cars. Riders are arranged 2 across in 2 rows for a total of 20 riders per train.
- Must transfer from wheelchair
- Woodstock Express at RCDB

Woodstock Express is a wooden roller coaster located at Kings Island and designed by John C. Allen. It is located in the children's rides area of the park known as Planet Snoopy. The coaster has undergone four different name changes as the children's area in which it resides has been renamed and rethemed multiple times since the park opened. It has also been painted a number of different color schemes since its debut.

== History ==
Woodstock Express was designed by John C. Allen of the Philadelphia Toboggan Coasters (PTC). It is based on the first three roller coasters he designed shortly after becoming the company's president in 1954. These coasters opened in 1956 at Hunt's Pier, Angela Park and the Gooding Zoo (now the Columbus Zoo and Aquarium). Allen modified the original design, making Woodstock Express a little taller and longer. He eliminated the curved loading station as well, opting instead for an in-line station that precedes the curve to the lift hill. This modified design was then used to build two nearly identical models at Kings Dominion and Carowinds. A third copy at Canada's Wonderland was also based on this design but is taller and slightly longer, and it was designed by Curtis D. Summers.

The coaster was originally named Scooby Doo and opened with the park in 1972 as part of "The Happy Land of Hanna-Barbera". Paying homage to The Beast after its successful launch in 1979, Scooby Doo was renamed The Beastie, and a tunnel was added to the bottom of its first drop in time for the 1980 season. In 2006, a decision was made during the Nickelodeon Universe overhaul to remove the tunnel and rename it to Fairly Odd Coaster (based on the Nickelodeon TV show The Fairly OddParents). Although Cedar Fair had the rights to continue using the themes through 2016 following its purchase of the park in 2006, it was decided to remove all remaining Hanna-Barbera and Nickelodeon themes from the kids area in time for the start of the 2010 season. As a result, the ride went through another name change to Woodstock Express in line with the new Planet Snoopy makeover.

Woodstock Express was awarded ACE Coaster Classic status, but that status has since been rescinded as a result of recent changes to the coaster.

== Layout ==
The layout of the ride is the basic figure 8 roller coaster. It is identical to the junior wooden coasters found at Kings Island sister parks – Woodstock Express for Kings Dominion and Carowinds, Ghoster Coaster at Canada's Wonderland, and Zach's Zoomer at Michigan's Adventure. It also shares many similarities with the Sea Dragon at Columbus Zoo and Aquarium's Rides At Adventure Cove. An on-ride photo camera is located at the bottom of the second drop.
