= Peoples Natural Gas Field =

Baseball park in Altoona, Pennsylvania, US

- B.C.B. Curve, PA

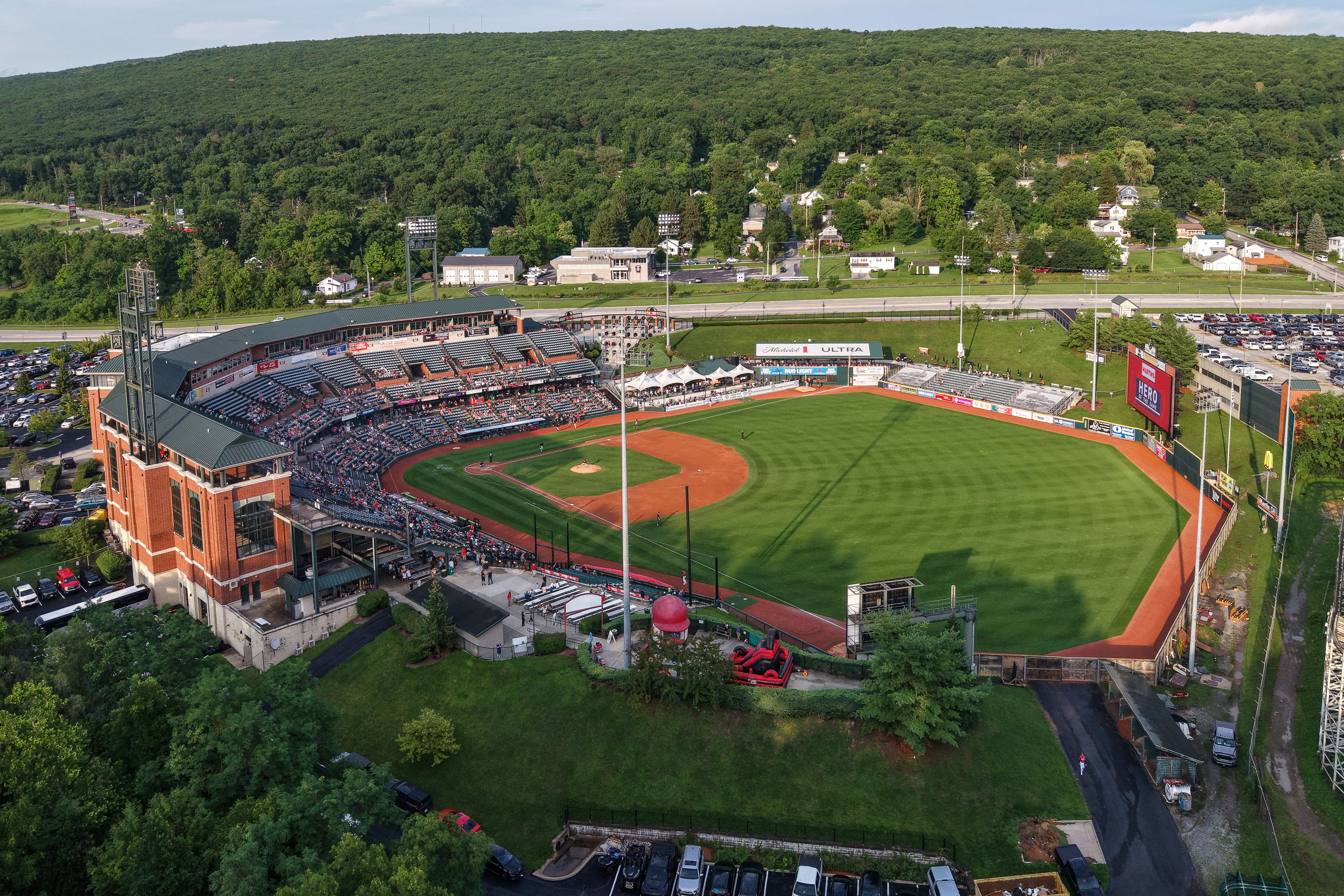

- Location within Pennsylvania Location within the United States
- Former names: Blair County Ballpark (1999–2012)
- Location: 1000 Park Avenue; Altoona, PA 16602
- Coordinates: 40°28′25″N 78°23′41″W
- Owner: Blair County
- Operator: Lozinak Baseball, LLC
- Capacity: 7,210
- Surface: Grass
- Record attendance: 10,164 (Baseball; Altoona Curve vs. Akron RubberDucks; August 26, 2023)
- Field size: Left Field: 325 feet Left–Center: 365 feet Center Field: 405 feet Right–Center: 375 feet Right Field: 325 feet Fence Height: Mostly 8 feet but varies from 6 to 16

Construction
- Groundbreaking: March 7, 1998
- Opened: April 15, 1999
- Cost: $20 million ($38.7 million in 2025 dollars)
- Architect: L. D. Astorino Companies
- Services engineer: Loftus Engineers LLC
- General contractors: Ralph J. Albarano & Sons

Tenant
- Altoona Curve (EL) (1999–present)

Peoples Natural Gas Field is a 7,210-seat baseball-only stadium in Altoona, Pennsylvania, that opened in 1999. It is the home ballpark of the Eastern League's Altoona Curve Minor League Baseball team.

== History ==
The groundbreaking ceremony for the stadium, then known as Blair County Ballpark, was held on March 7, 1998. The addition of Major League Baseball teams in Phoenix, Arizona, and St. Petersburg, Florida, in 1998 also created room for Minor League Baseball to expand. Two additional teams were added to the Eastern League for the 1999 season: the Altoona Curve and the Erie SeaWolves. The city of Altoona won the favor of the Eastern League over a bid from Springfield, Massachusetts. The stadium hosted its first regular season baseball game on April 15, 1999, as the Curve defeated the Bowie Baysox, 6–1.

From 1999 to 2002, total seating capacity was listed at 6,176. Prior to the 2003 season, an additional 1,034 seats were created with the construction of the new left-field reserved bleacher section, the third-base picnic pavilion, and the left-field party deck. Blair County Ballpark hosted the Eastern League All-Star Game on July 12, 2006, before a then-record crowd of 9,308 fans. The current attendance record was set on August 26, 2023 when 10,164 fans witnessed the Double-A debut of Altoona's Paul Skenes against the Akron RubberDucks.

On January 31, 2012, it was announced that Peoples Natural Gas had signed a naming-rights deal, making the new Peoples Natural Gas Field name official. In addition, Peoples Natural Gas is conducting a study for on-site green energy.

== Features ==
Peoples Natural Gas Field has a façade that resembles an old-fashioned railroad roundhouse that are prevalent throughout the city of Altoona. The stadium is double-decked, with the Diamond Club seating section making up the lower level. The main concourse with concessions and restrooms sits behind this section, and is covered by the upper levels of seating.

Peoples Natural Gas Field is unique because of its roller coaster located beyond the right-field wall. This ride, called Skyliner, is actually part of the Lakemont Park amusement park located next door. The ridges of the Allegheny Mountains can also be viewed from inside the stadium. The ballpark's picturesque view earned it a runner-up position in the "Best View in the Minors" competition in 2018. It finished behind only Southwest University Park, home of the El Paso Chihuahuas.

In MLB 2K13 the minor league field labeled "AA East Field" is extremely similar to Peoples Natural Gas Field.

=== Seating ===
- Diamond club: 1,634 seats
- Terrace level: 1,204 seats
- Grandstand level: 2,646 seats
- Outfield reserved: 744 seats
- Third-base picnic pavilion: 250 seats
- "Rail Kings" (on party deck): 40 seats
- Skyboxes: 292 seats
- Bleachers: 400 seats

== Gallery ==
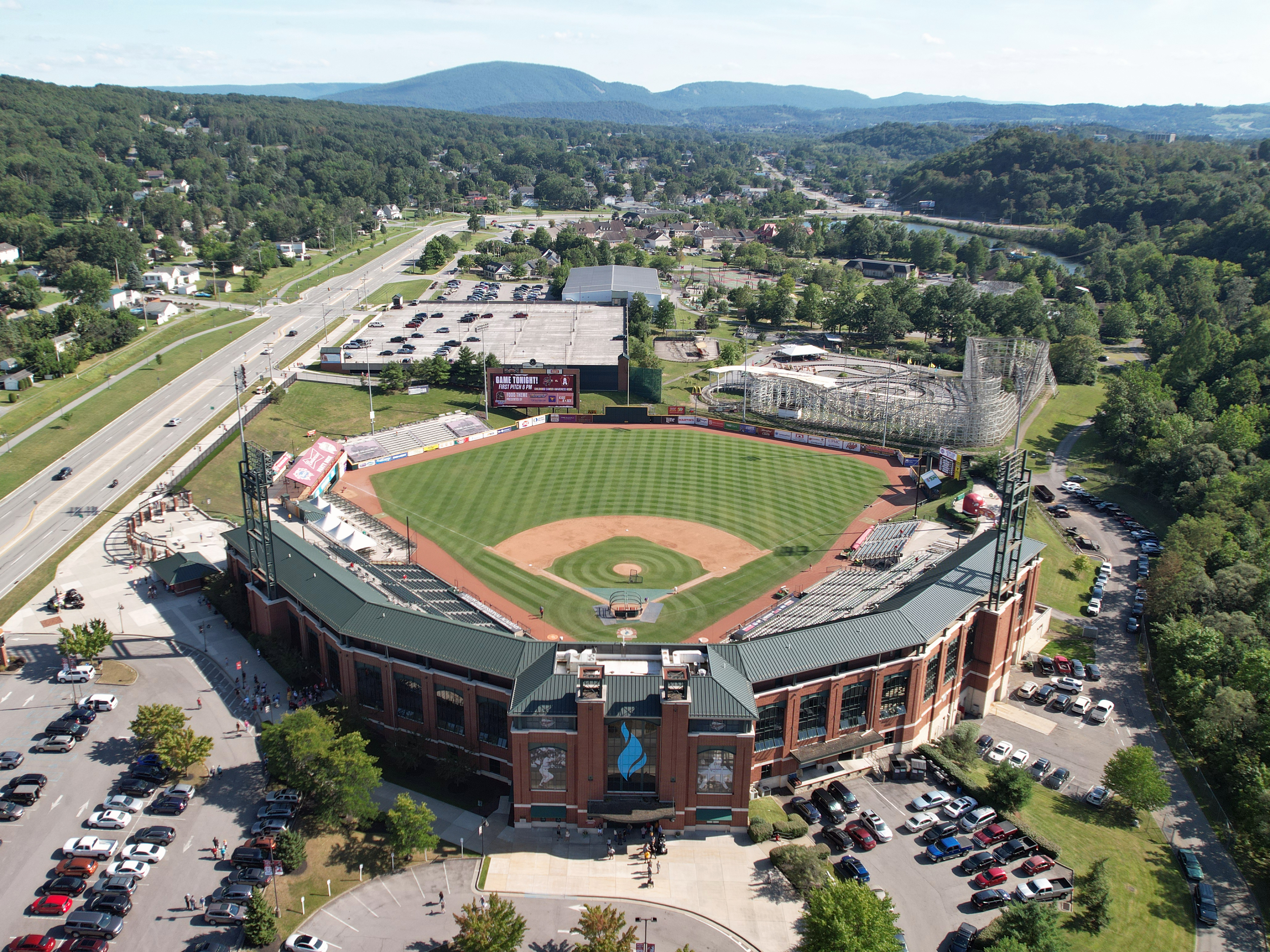
Exterior

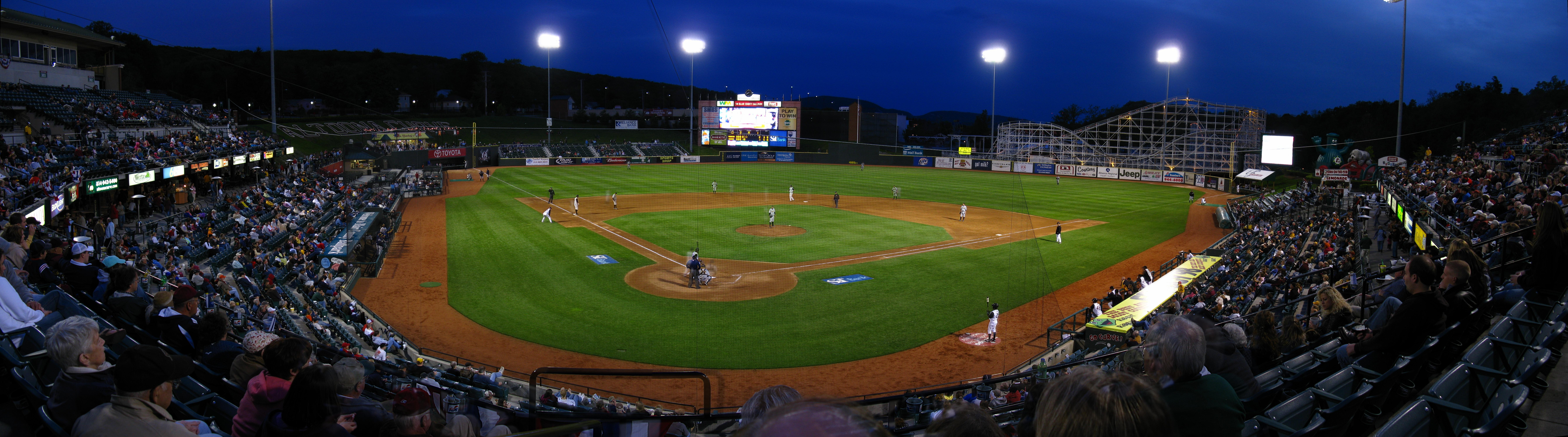
Infield of Peoples Natural Gas Field

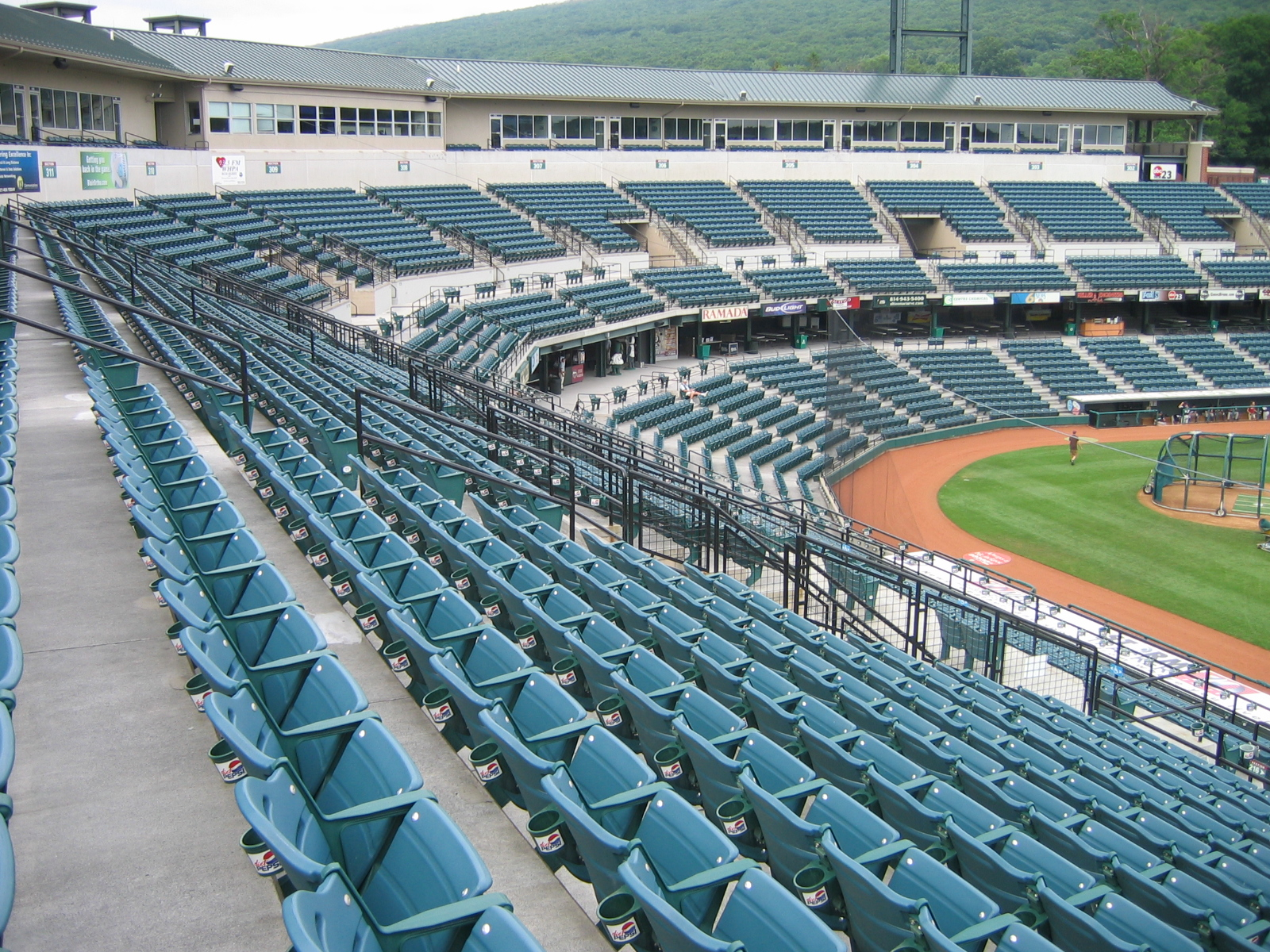
Seating section

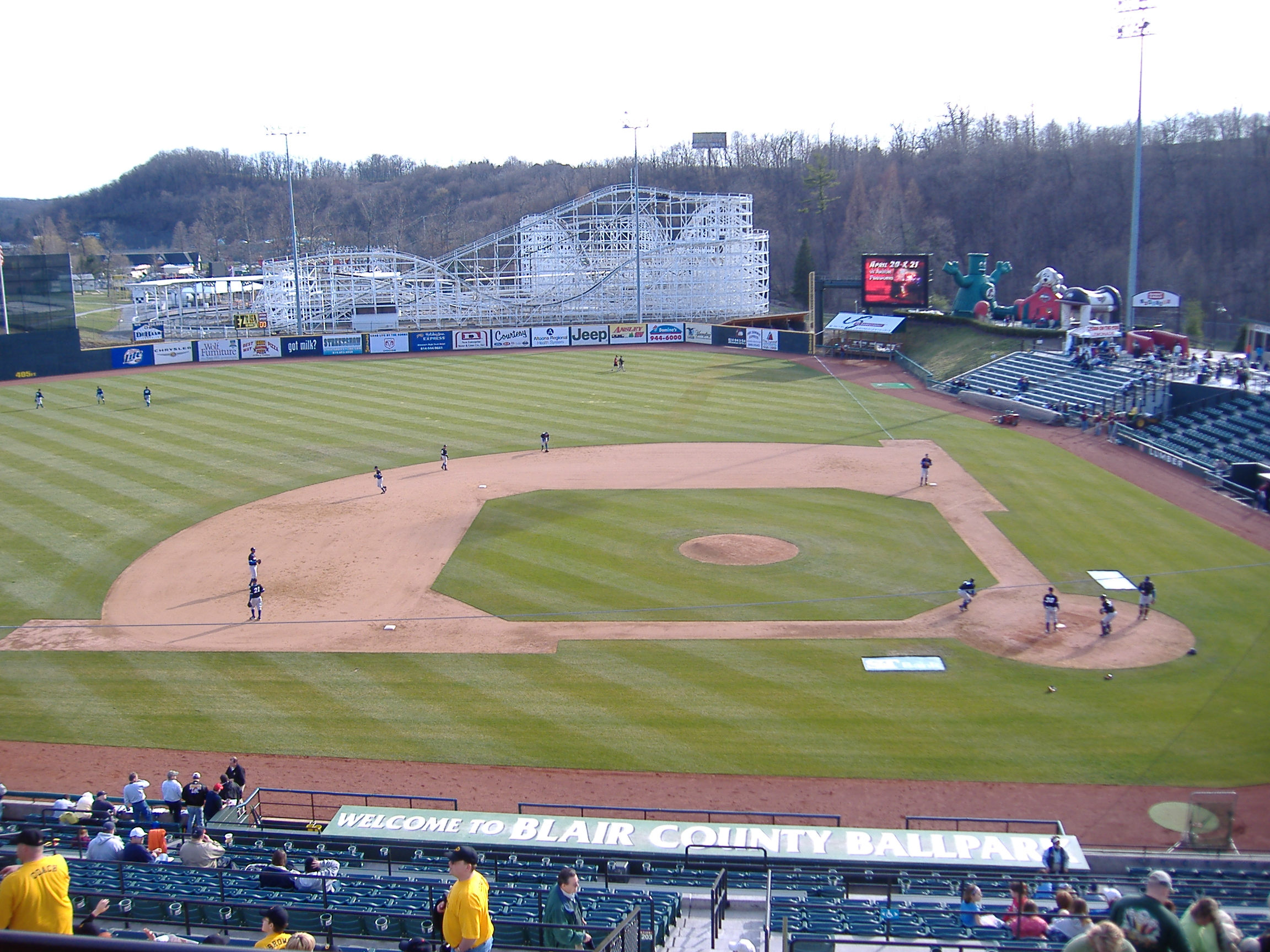
Field at Peoples Natural Gas Field from third base side with Lakemont Park's Skyliner roller coaster in the background

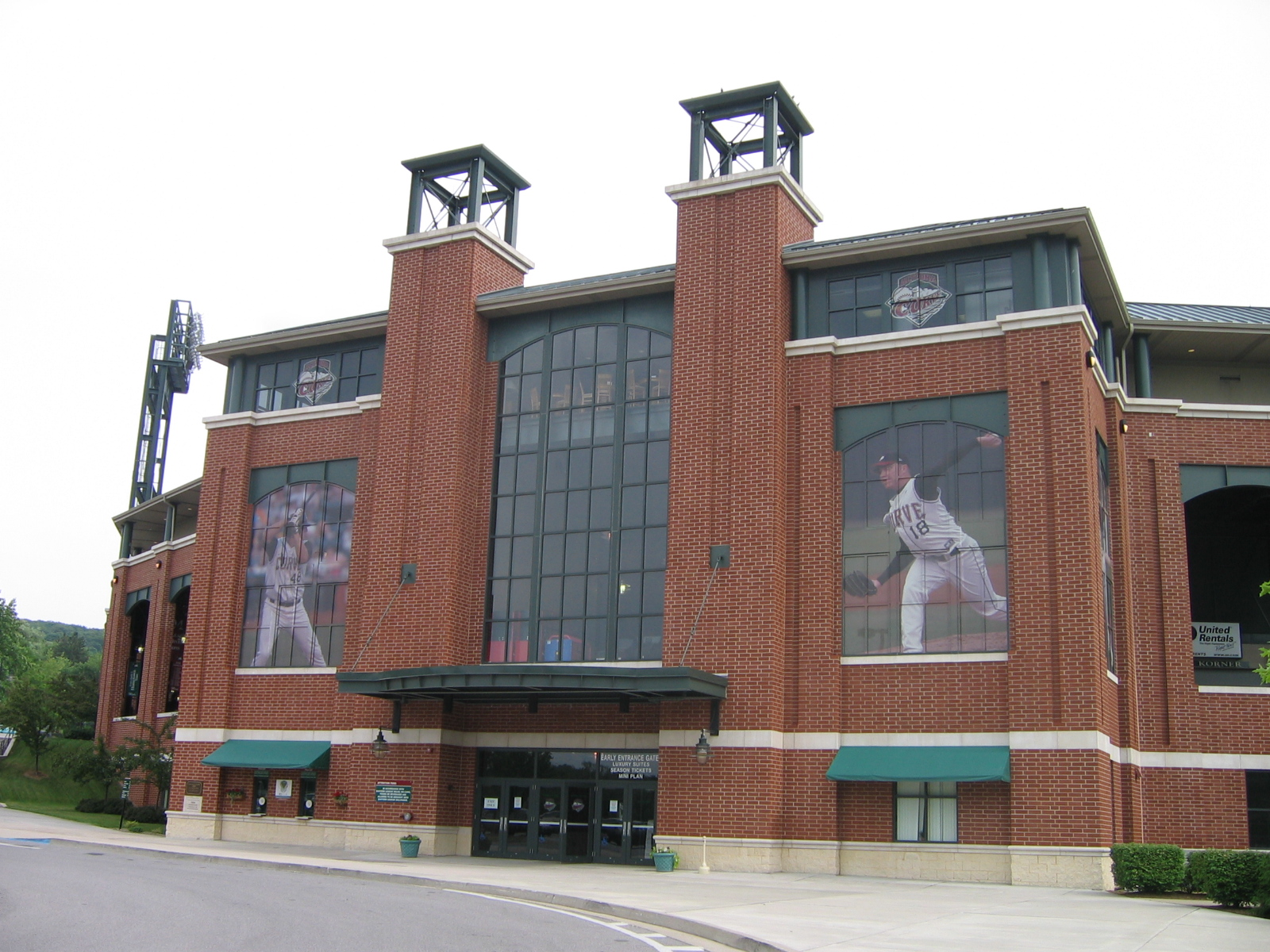
Façade of Peoples Natural Gas Field
