= Swamp Fox (roller coaster) =

Roller coaster in Myrtle Beach, South Carolina

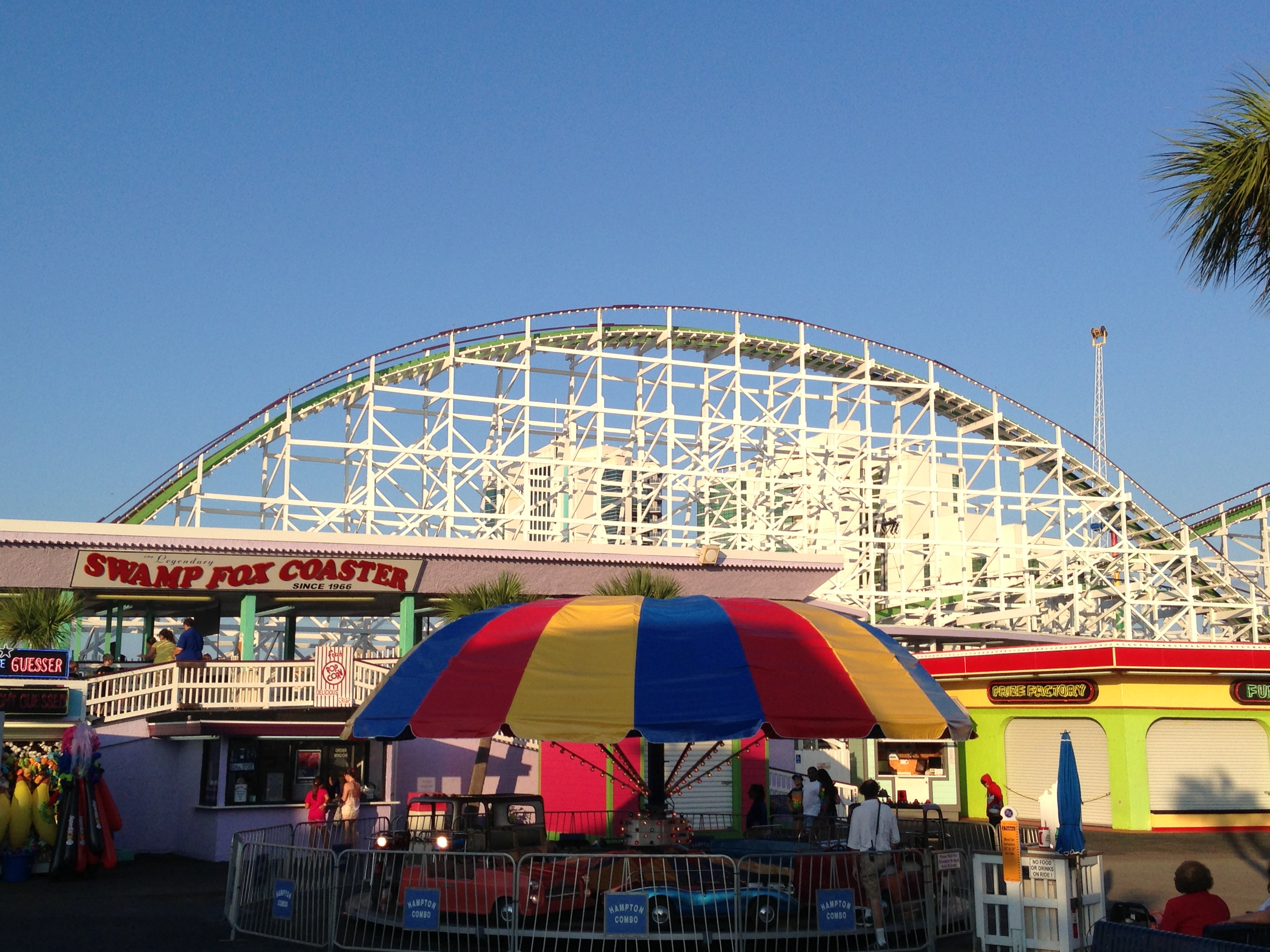

Family Kingdom Amusement Park
- Location: Family Kingdom Amusement Park
- Coordinates: 33.682510°N 78.891702°W
- Status: Operating
- Opening date: 1966

General statistics
- Type: Wood
- Manufacturer: Philadelphia Toboggan Coasters
- Designer: John Allen
- Track layout: Double Out and Back
- Lift/launch system: Chain lift hill
- Height: 75 ft (23 m)
- Drop: 65 ft (20 m)
- Length: 2,400 ft (730 m)
- Speed: 50 mph (80 km/h)
- Inversions: 0
- Height restriction: 48 in (122 cm)
- Swamp Fox at RCDB

The Swamp Fox is a wooden roller coaster located in Myrtle Beach, South Carolina, United States. It is one of 37 rides at Family Kingdom Amusement Park. The coaster is named for American Revolutionary War leader Francis Marion, who was nicknamed the "Swamp Fox".

The Swamp Fox is a wooden roller coaster that runs over a 2,400-foot (730 m), figure-eight track. The "double out and back" design takes riders to heights of 75 feet (22.9 m) at speeds up to 50 miles per hour (80 km/h) and features dramatic drops of up to 65 feet (19.8 m).

The coaster was built by the Philadelphia Toboggan Company of Pennsylvania and opened in 1966 as one of the rides at Grand Strand Amusement Park. In 1992, that park was purchased by the Ammons family and rechristened as Family Kingdom Amusement Park. The Swamp Fox was then totally refurbished according to the specifications of the original design by John C. Allen. In one experiment performed on the Swamp Fox, operators found that the train ran the length of its track anywhere from eight to 10 seconds faster at 9 PM than it did around 2 PM. In 2016, American Coaster Enthusiasts marked the 50th anniversary of the Swamp Fox by adding a historical marker. The Swamp Fox was declared a historic structure by the city of Myrtle Beach in March 2017.
