= Roseland Park =

Former amusement park in Canandaigua, New York, US

- Previously known as Lakeside Park (1925–1928)
- Interactive map of Roseland Park
- Location: 169 Lake Shore Drive, Canandaigua, New York, U.S.
- Coordinates: 42°52′29.93″N 77°15′43.47″W
- Status: Defunct
- Opened: 1925; 101 years ago
- Closed: September 2, 1985; 40 years ago
- Owner: William Muar (1925-1961) then Lester Boyce (until close)
- Slogan: "Playground of the Finger Lakes"
- Operating season: May - September

Attractions
- Total: 21 (at time of close)
- Roller coasters: 3

Roseland Park was an amusement park located at 169 Lake Shore Drive in Canandaigua, New York, along the north shore of Canandaigua Lake. Roseland started operation in 1925 under its founder and original owner, William Muar. It continued to operate for 60 years until its closure on September 2, 1985.

== History ==
Roseland originally opened up under the name "Lakeside Park" with little more than a dance hall and a few rides. The dance hall itself was named "Roseland" after the Roseland Ballroom in New York City. After three years it had become such an integral component to the park's identity that the park itself was renamed from Lakeside to Roseland.

Over the years, as the park changed and grew, it saw many rides come and go. Some of the additional attractions included a Ferris wheel, bumper cars, a miniature train ride, a sky ride that went out over part of Canandaigua Lake before returning to the station, and the park's Carousel, which was purchased for the park in 1941 from the defunct Long Branch amusement park. For a period of time there was even a live circus act. Additional attractions were added and changed over the years, including the park's major wooden roller coaster, the Skyliner, which was built in 1960.

== Park rides ==
The following is a partial list of attractions Roseland had at various points throughout its history.

- Skyliner
- Carousel
- Kiddie Coaster(s)
- Ferris Wheel
- Gold Nugget (ride through spooky-house)
- Flying Scooters
- Flying Bobs
- Antique Cars
- Yo-Yo
- Bumper boats
- Scrambler
- Sky Ride
- The Round Up
- The Golden Nugget (a Haunted house)
- The Whip
- Miniature golf
- Teacups
- Tilt a Whirl
- Flying Jet
- Wild Mouse
- Live Circus Act

== After closure ==
On September 16, two weeks following the park closure, an auction was held to sell off all of the park's remains. While almost nothing of the site that Roseland once occupied remains today, two of the park's most notable rides can still be found in operation. Philadelphia Toboggan Company's carousel No. 18, was purchased at the auction for $397,500 by the Pyramid Companies of Syracuse. It was refurbished and restored to its original colors, and then installed at the Carousel Center mall in Syracuse, New York on October 15, 1990. Carousel No. 18 was originally built in 1909.

The other ride still in operation is the Skyliner, a wooden roller coaster. This ride was also built by the Philadelphia Toboggan Company. It was built at Roseland and opened in 1960, where it operated until the park closure in 1985. It was then moved to Lakemont Park in Altoona, Pennsylvania reopening in 1987 under the same name. It was one of the first large roller coasters designed by famous coaster designer John C. Allen. It is a double out and back coaster with a track length of 2400 feet, and a maximum height of 60 feet.

A housing development now sits on the property where Roseland Park once was. Though the park has long since shut down, its name still exists today in the form of Roseland Waterpark, which is also located in Canandaigua.
