= Delmar Garden Amusement Park =

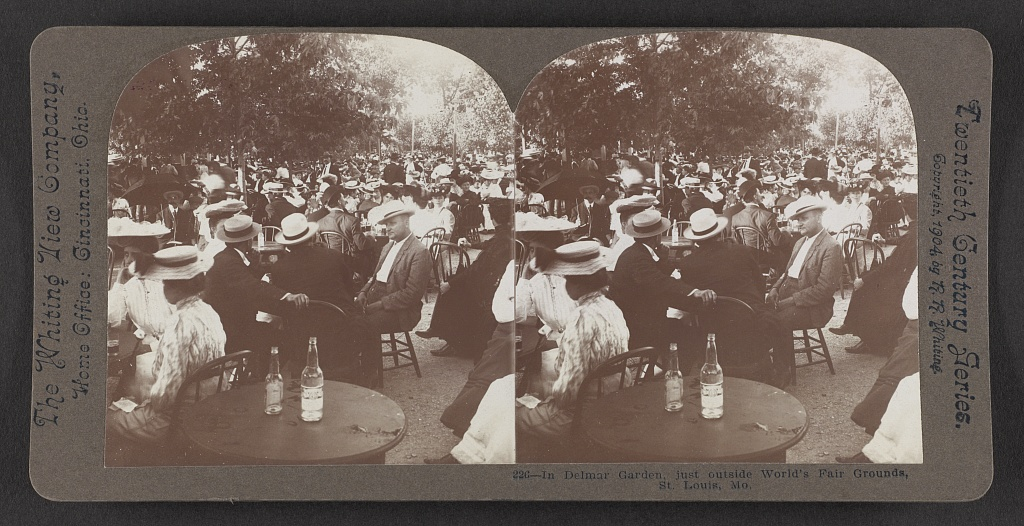
- In Delmar Garden, just outside World's Fair Grounds, c. 1904
- Location: Delmar Boulevard, University City, Missouri
- Coordinates: 38.657°N 90.306°W
- Status: Defunct
- Opened: c. 1900–1905
- Closed: c. 1918–1919
- Area: ~42 acres

Delmar Garden Amusement Park was an early 20th‑century amusement park located along Delmar Boulevard in what is now University City, Missouri, at the western edge of St. Louis. It opened before the 1904 St. Louis World's Fair and closed in the late 1910s.

== History ==
=== Origins and development ===
Delmar Garden was established between Kingsland and Skinker boulevards along Delmar Boulevard. It opened circa 1900–1905, featuring a carousel, roller coasters, theaters, dance pavilions, beer gardens, picnic areas, baseball diamond, football field, and a lake.

The park was adjacent to the Delmar Race Track and connected directly to the streetcar network. The streetcar line looped through the southwest corner of the park before returning downtown St. Louis —hence the name “Delmar Loop”.

=== Peak years ===
During its heyday, Delmar Garden was described by the St. Louis Globe‑Democrat as “the most gigantic undertaking” in the city's history. It hosted baseball and football games, live theater, carnival-style attractions (including a “mystic chamber” with harmless electric shocks), and various dining and entertainment venues.

=== Decline and closure ===
The park's attendance eventually declined and it was determined the land would be more valuable as a residential area. The park closed and was dismantled around 1919.

== Legacy ==
Delmar Garden's primary legacy is cultural: the amusement park's streetcar loop shape inspired the name for the "Delmar Loop", now a thriving entertainment district featuring restaurants, music venues, art galleries, and historic preservation. The street names Westgate (and Eastgate) referred to the entrances to the adjacent race track. The Delmar Loop–Parkview Gardens Historic District is listed on the National Register of Historic Places. In 2007, the American Planning Association named the Loop one of “10 Great Streets in America.”

== See also ==
- Delmar Loop
- List of defunct amusement parks in the United States
