= Skyliner (roller coaster) =

Wooden roller coaster in Altoona, Pennsylvania

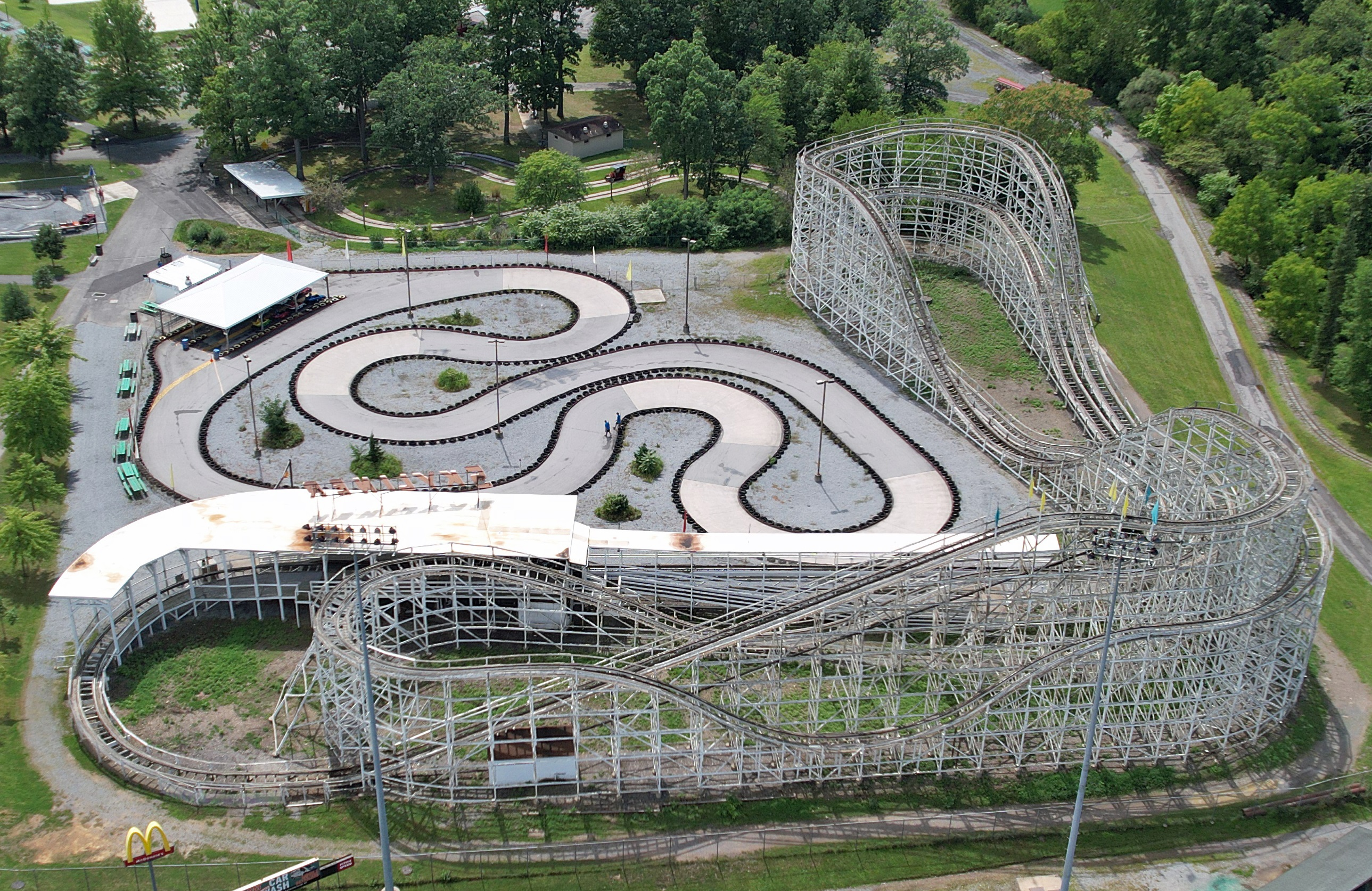
- An aerial view of Skyliner in 2022

Lakemont Park
- Coordinates: 40.4729°N 78.3952°W
- Status: Closed
- Opening date: 1987

Roseland Park
- Coordinates: 42°52′29.93″N 77°15′43.47″W
- Status: Removed
- Opening date: 1960
- Closing date: 1985
- Skyliner at Roseland Park at RCDB

General statistics
- Type: Wood – Family
- Manufacturer: Philadelphia Toboggan Coasters
- Designer: John C. Allen
- Track layout: Double Out and Back
- Height: 60 ft (18 m)
- Drop: 45 ft (14 m)
- Length: 2,400 ft (730 m)
- Speed: 40 mph (64 km/h)
- Duration: 1:40
- Max vertical angle: 52°
- Trains: Single train with 3 cars; riders arranged 2 across in 3 rows for a total of 18 riders per train
- Skyliner at RCDB

Skyliner is a wooden roller coaster located at Lakemont Park in Altoona, Pennsylvania. It first opened in 1960 at New York's Roseland Park, and was John C. Allen's first full-size coaster design. (Note: John Allen designed three kiddie coasters prior to this one.) Roseland Park closed in 1985, and following the success Knoebels had in relocating the wooden coaster Phoenix, Lakemont Park followed suit. Skyliner reopened at Lakemont Park in 1987 after being moved from Roseland Park. Skyliner is an ACE Coaster Classic. The ride has not operated since 2023.

Skyliner operates a single train with three cars, which seat up to 18 adults. The ride's train uses buzz bars. Skyliner's train is painted with Minor League Baseball team Altoona Curve's team logo and colors. The phrase "GO CURVE" is also written on the train. The Altoona Curve's baseball stadium is adjacent to Lakemont Park, and its right field is located next to Skyliner. Consequently, the Skyliner itself has been erroneously said to be part of the ballpark.
