= Shellpot Park =

Shellpot Park was a trolley park located in Brandywine Hundred, Delaware that operated from 1893 until 1934. The park was developed by the Wilmington City Railway Company after extending the trolley lines to Shellpot Creek near the outskirts of the city. In its early years, Shellpot Park (and the adjacent Malin's Grove) was little more than a wooded lake and a place to picnic. At the peak of its popularity, the park also featured a miniature railroad, carousel, and roller coaster.

The carousel, built in 1916 by the Philadelphia Toboggan Company, had twenty-eight jumping horses, eighteen stationary horses, two chariots, and two Wurlitzer band organs. The roller coaster, also designed by PTC, was added in 1925 and featured a 65-foot vertical drop. (The tallest coaster of its era, at 100 feet, Cyclone, was built the same year at Revere Beach.)

As interest in the park waned after the 1920s, the park added an open-air arena for boxing events. In 1932, the carousel was sold to Dorney Park & Wildwater Kingdom; it was subsequently destroyed in a 1983 fire at that park. In 1934, a fire along the railway destroyed most of the remaining attractions, and Shellpot Park closed. The former dance pavilion, converted into a roller rink, was eventually torn down in 1936.
