= Family Kingdom Amusement Park =

Seaside amusement park in Myrtle Beach, South Carolina

- Previously known as Grand Strand Amusement Park (1966 – 1991)

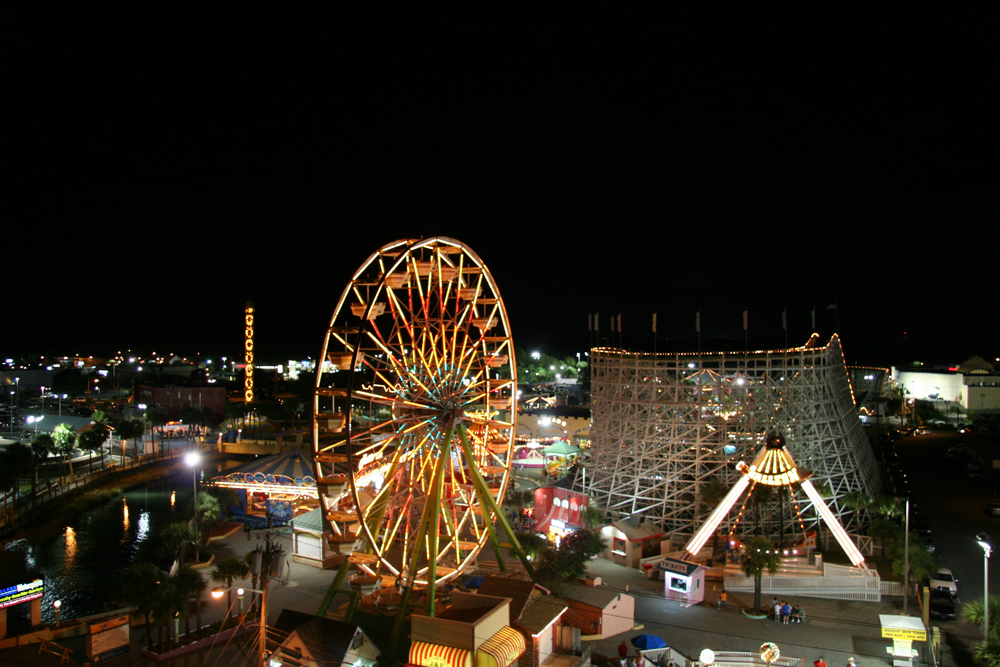
- Family Kingdom Amusement Park
- Interactive map of Family Kingdom Amusement Park
- Location: 300 Ocean Blvd; Myrtle Beach, South Carolina 29577, United States
- Coordinates: 33°40′54″N 78°53′35″W
- Status: Operating
- Opened: 1966
- General manager: Donald Sipes (since 1993)
- Operating season: Early April through Mid September
- Area: 13 acres (5.3 ha)

Attractions
- Total: 37
- Roller coasters: 3
- Website: www.familykingdomfun.com

Family Kingdom Amusement Park is a seaside amusement park in Myrtle Beach, South Carolina. Located on Ocean Boulevard in Myrtle Beach, the amusement park has 37 rides for adults and children of all ages, including thrill rides, family rides, kiddie rides and go karts. In 2008 TripAdvisor ranked it at number five on its list of the top 10 amusement parks outside Orlando.

In business for more than 40 years, the park has the 2,400 foot, figure eight Swamp Fox wooden roller coaster, which is one of roughly one hundred wooden roller coasters still operating in North America and ranked number 10 on About.com's list of the top 10 most underrated roller coasters in North America. In 2016, American Coaster Enthusiasts marked the 50th anniversary of the Swamp Fox by adding a historical marker. The Swamp Fox was also declared a historic structure by the city in March 2017.

Other signature rides include O.D. Hopkins Log Flume, Great Pistolero Round-up and the Giant Wheel.

Family Kingdom's "Giant Wheel" Ferris wheel has round open gondolas that give a 100-foot-high view of Myrtle Beach and the Atlantic Ocean.

There is no admission price to enter the open park. Ride tickets can be purchased independently. Wristbands that entitle patrons to ride all day are available. The park provides free entertainment such as clowns, magicians, jugglers, stilt walkers, face painters and balloon sculptors. Family Kingdom Amusement Park is located on both banks of historic Withers Swash. The swash is a point where a natural stream meets the beach and ocean, and through which tides flow. Much of the surrounding area was part of a 66,000-acre king's grant to Robert Francis Withers in the early 1700s, who operated it as an indigo plantation overlooking the swash.

Family Kingdom Amusement Park is approximately 13 acres.

== History ==
Family Kingdom Amusement Park opened as Grand Strand Amusement Park in 1966. The park was purchased by the Ammons family in 1992 and renamed “Family Kingdom Amusement Park”.

Country music star Kenny Chesney shot part of his "Anything but Mine" music video at Family Kingdom in 2005.

== Splashes Oceanfront Water Park ==
Splashes Oceanfront Water Park
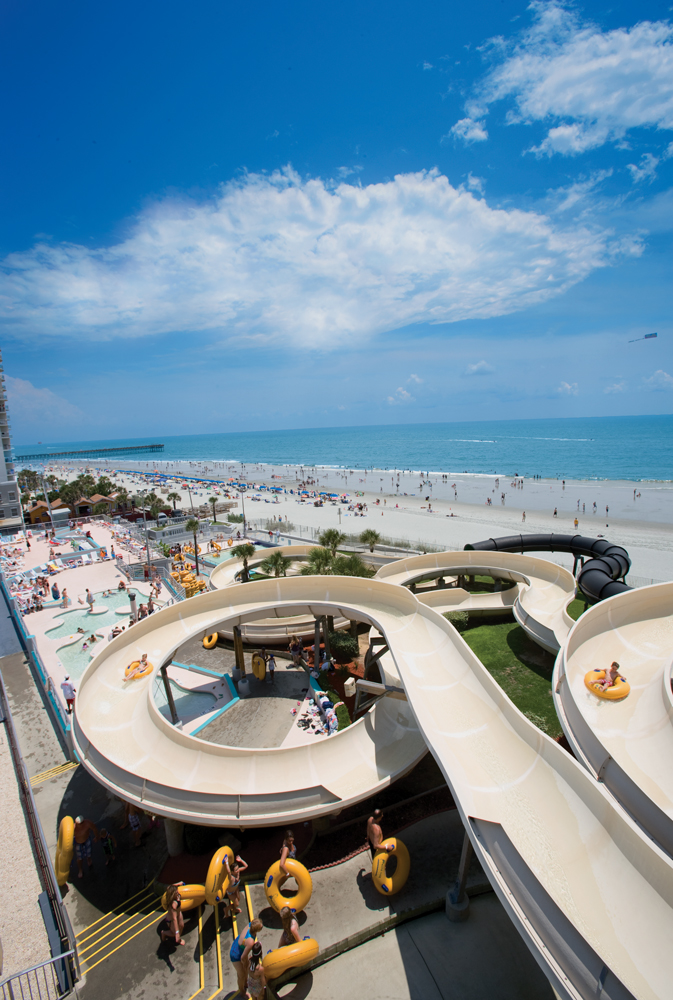
- Interactive map of Splashes Oceanfront Water Park
- Location: Myrtle Beach, South Carolina, United States
- Operating season: Generally Memorial Day weekend through Labor Day weekend
- Website: www.familykingdomfun.com

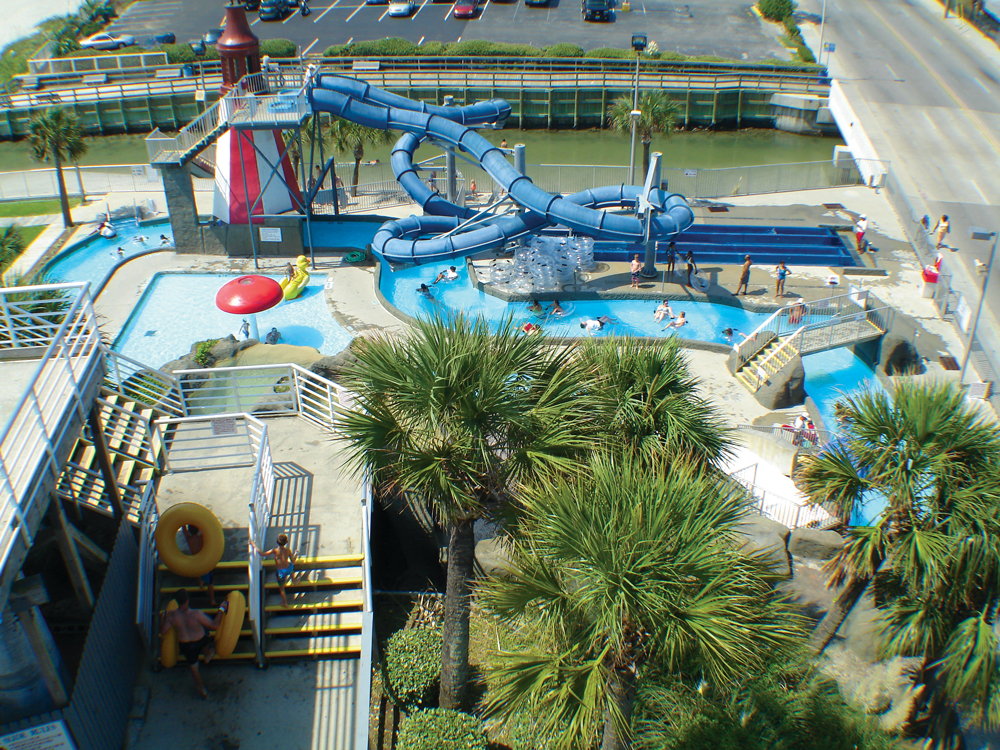
An area of Splashes Oceanfront Water Park

Splashes Oceanfront Water Park, originally known as Wild Rapids, was a water park attraction in Myrtle Beach, South Carolina. A two-acre facility with 500 feet of Atlantic Ocean frontage, it was located across Ocean Boulevard from Family Kingdom Amusement Park.

The park's attractions included a lazy river with waterfalls, water flumes, and eight kiddie slides. In 2007, TripAdvisor named Family Kingdom and Splashes number five on its list of the top 10 amusement parks outside Orlando.

The park was located at 300 South Ocean Boulevard. It had 18 attractions, including two enclosed body waterslides, two speed slides, two open flume slides, and an enclosed flume slide; a children's area that includes splash pools, eight kiddie slides, two rain trees, and a play pool with a multi-tiered waterfall.

=== History ===
The park first opened under the name "Wild Rapids" in 1977. In 1997, Family Kingdom Amusement Park purchased the water park, expanded the water attractions, and renamed it "Family Kingdom Water Park". In 2013, the water park was renamed "Splashes Oceanfront Water Park".

In 2022, the waterpark was permanently closed and demolished after Family Kingdom was purchased by new owners.

== Current rides ==
=== Roller coasters ===
Family Kingdom features three different roller coasters. The oldest is Swamp Fox.

The park announced November 18, 2025 that a Rocky Mountain Construction coaster more than 100 feet tall was being added by summer 2026.

Name	Manufacturer	Type	Design	Year opened	Description
Swamp Fox	Philadelphia Toboggan Coasters; Designed by John Allen	Wooden	Sitdown	1966	The oldest roller coaster in the park, which features 2,400 foot, figure eight wooden roller coaster, which is one of only 122 wooden roller coasters operating in North America. and ranked number 10 on About.com's list of the top 10 most underrated roller coasters in North America.
Twist ‘n’ Shout	Zamperla	Steel	Sitdown	2014	A steel roller coaster with several sharp turns and big dips. Previously operated at Magic Springs and Crystal Falls as Twist ‘n’ Shout from 2000 to 2012 and first opened at Gillian’s Wonderland Pier as Wild Wonder.
Dragon Coaster	Jung-Max Rides	Steel	Sitdown	2023	A small dragon themed roller coaster meant for children with a small drop, a few hills and a few non-banked turns.

=== Other rides ===
Name	Year opened	Manufacturer	Model	Description
Carousel	1923	Philadelphia Toboggan Company	Carousel	An antique carousel from the Philadelphia Toboggan Company.
Antique Cars	1969	Arrow Development	Electric Cars	An antique car ride. Features Electric- powered cars that go along a track.
Bumper Boats	1969	Arrow Development	Bumper Boats	A water-based bumper ride. The small boats can hold one or two people and have oversized fenders that resemble a large tractor tire inner tube
Choo Choo Train	1970	Chance Rides	Train	A train ride that takes riders around the park.
Yo-Yo	1980	Chance Rides	Chair-O-Plane	This ride is a swing ride that is a variation on the carousel in which the seats are suspended from the rotating top of the carousel.
Ferris Wheel	1990	Chance Rides	Ferris Wheel	A 100-foot tall ferris wheel ride where riders can get a panoramic view of the park.
Hurricane	1990	Moser's Rides	Music Express	A quick circular ride that travels clockwise around an undulating track.
Tilt-A-Whirl	1993	Larson	Tilt-A-Whirl	The ride consists of seven freely-spinning cars that hold three or four riders each, which are attached at fixed pivot points on a rotating platform. As the platform rotates, parts of the platform are raised and lowered, with the resulting centrifugal and gravitational forces on the revolving cars causing them to spin in different directions and at variable speeds.
The Great Pistolero Roundup	1995	Sally Dark Rides	Quick Draw (interactive dark ride)	A two-passenger, interactive dark ride themed to a gold robbery in a cartoonish-styled Mexico. Previously a Mexican restaurant located within the park.
Thunderbolt	1995	Chance Rides	Flying Bobs	Similar to "Hurricane" but with suspended vehicles.
Galleon	1998	Zamperla	Galleon	This is a boat suspended from a giant "A" frame structure. The boat swings back and forth until it achieves a height of 40 feet (12 m) and is at a 75-degree angle with its initial resting position, giving riders the sensation of weightlessness.
Log Flume Water Ride	1998	Hopkins	Log Flume	A log flume water ride and a water roller coaster, built in 1998 and consisting of two lifts, a spillway that is 20-feet (6 m), and a roller coaster track section.
Dodgems Bumper Cars	2000	Duce	Bumper Cars	A classic bumper cars attraction
Kite Flyer	2001	Zamperla	Kite Flyer	This is a ride with vehicles in the shape of hang gliders that spins and tilts at a 50-degree angle.
F5	2023	KMG	Freakout	A 69 ft (21 m) pendulum ride that swings around on am arm reaching 240- degrees at its maximum while riders sit in suspended seats while the ride vehicle spins while the arms swings.

=== Children’s rides ===
Name	Year opened	Manufacturer	Model	Description
4 x 4 Big Trucks	2000	Zamperla	Convoy	A kiddie ride with Truck-like carts and an oval track.
Canoes	1966	Allan Herschell Company	Canoe	
Cycles	1990	Hampton Amusements	Motorcycle Jump	Riders sit on little motorcycles that go around a small oval.
Flight School	1998	Zamperla	Flying Tigers	This ride features 16 tiger shaped cars that travel along an oblong track and "whip" as they go around the bend at either end.
Frog Hopper	2001		Frog Hopper	A small drop tower meant for children.
Hampton Combo	1988	Hampton Amusements	Umbrella ride	A kiddie ride with Firetruck shaped carts and an oval track.
Jump Around Buggies	2009	Zamperla	Jump Around	This family ride has vehicles rotating around a core that features a colorful design theme.
Kiddie Speedway	1990	Allan Herschell Company	Kiddie Speedway	Small race cars that travel on an oval track.
Kiddie Swing	1990	Zamperla	Kiddie Swing	A small version of the Yo-Yo, although this ride does not lift or undulate.
Kiddie Wheel	1999	Zamperla	Mini Ferris Wheel	A children's version of the Giant Wheel.
Magic Bikes	2009	Zamperla	Magic Bikes	This ride has colorful vehicles with elevated seats and bicycle pedals.
Mini Bumper Cars	2008	Zamperla	Mini Bumper Cars	A miniature bumper cars ride with cat-and-mouse–themed cars.
Mini Enterprise	2009	Zamperla	Mini Enterprise	Riders steer a rocket ship.
Red Baron	1966	Allan Herschell Company	Aeroplane	A small airplane type ride with 2 person vehicles.
Wet Boats	1975	Allan Herschell Company	Boat ride	
