= Woodside Amusement Park =

Former amusement park in Philadelphia, Pennsylvania

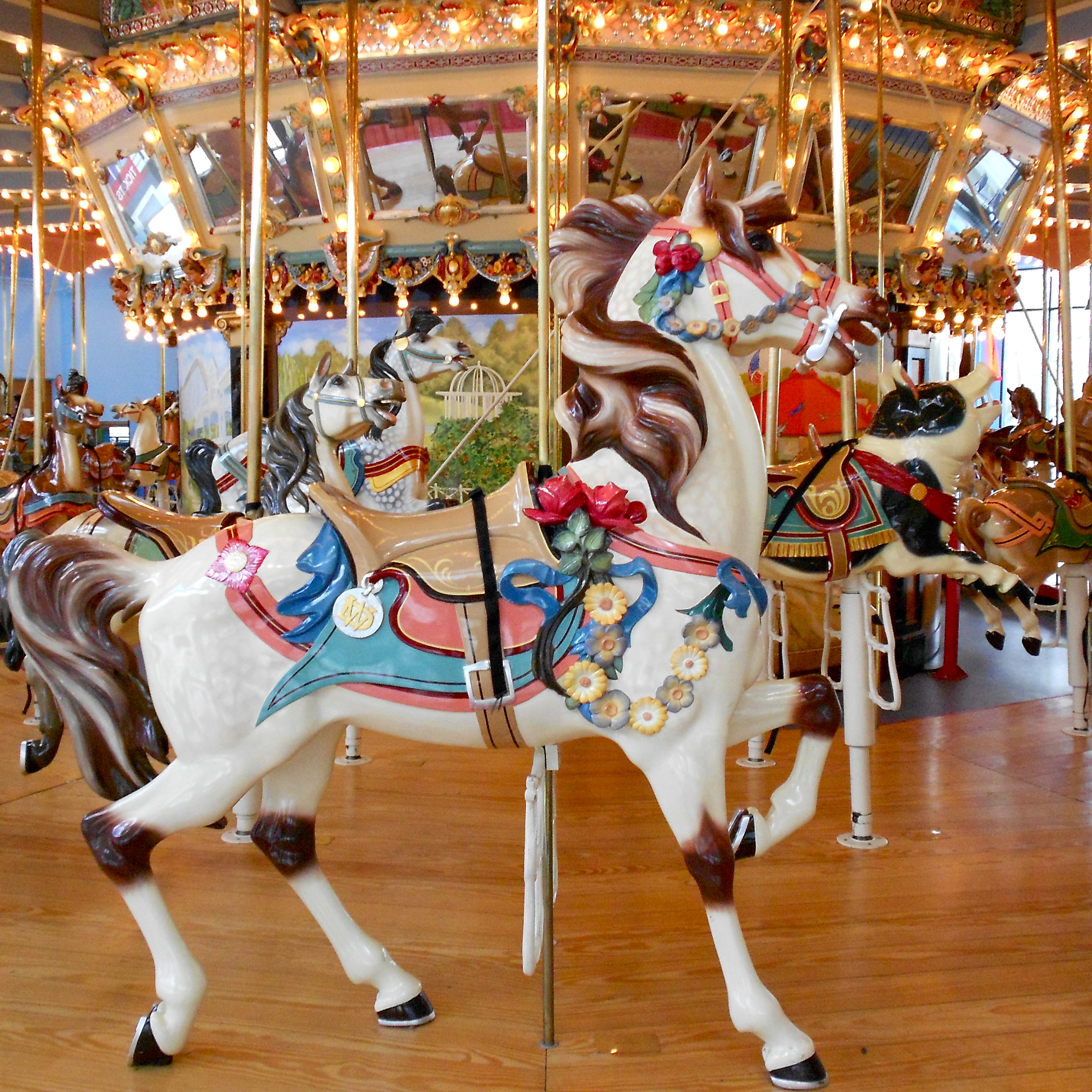
Lead horse on Woodside Amusement Park's Dentzel carousel, now at the Please Touch Museum

Woodside Amusement Park was an amusement park that once operated at Fairmount Park in Philadelphia, Pennsylvania. It was constructed in 1897 by the Fairmount Park Transportation Company (FPT), and it continued operations until 1955. FPT's trolley line ran for 10 miles around the park. The introduction of the trolley also introduced "non-bourgeois elements", and the park lost its "middle class tone". As a result, many who visited the park never returned, and instead went to its competitor Willow Grove Park.

One of its coasters was transferred to the Million Dollar Pier as "The Skooter" in Atlantic City, New Jersey after the park's closure. Other famous rides "...included the famous Hummer roller coaster, the Whip, and the Wild Cat." Also in the park was a one-third-mile wooden cycling track, which was used by Major Taylor to break many world records in 1898. The Please Touch Museum currently holds the Dentzel carousel which once operated in the park.

An article published in The New York Times on October 7, 1955, (p.50) stated that a syndicate of real estate investors based in Philadelphia and headed by Lewis Silverman, had purchased the park's rides and intended to relocate the park to a new "two million dollar" amusement park, which was planned to have been constructed in Levittown, Pennsylvania. However, the Levittown amusement park was never built.
