= Willow Grove Park =

Former amusement park in Willow Grove, Pennsylvania

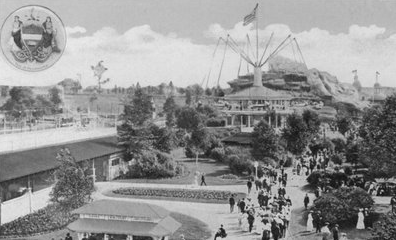
- Willow Grove Park
- Interactive map of Willow Grove Park
- Location: Willow Grove, Pennsylvania
- Coordinates: 40.1392°N 75.1211°W
- Status: Defunct
- Opened: 1896
- Closed: 1975

Willow Grove Park was an amusement park located in Willow Grove, Pennsylvania. It operated for eighty years, from 1896 to 1975. Having replaced Ridgway Park near modern Penn's Landing, it also outlasted its main competitor, Woodside Amusement Park in Fairmount Park.

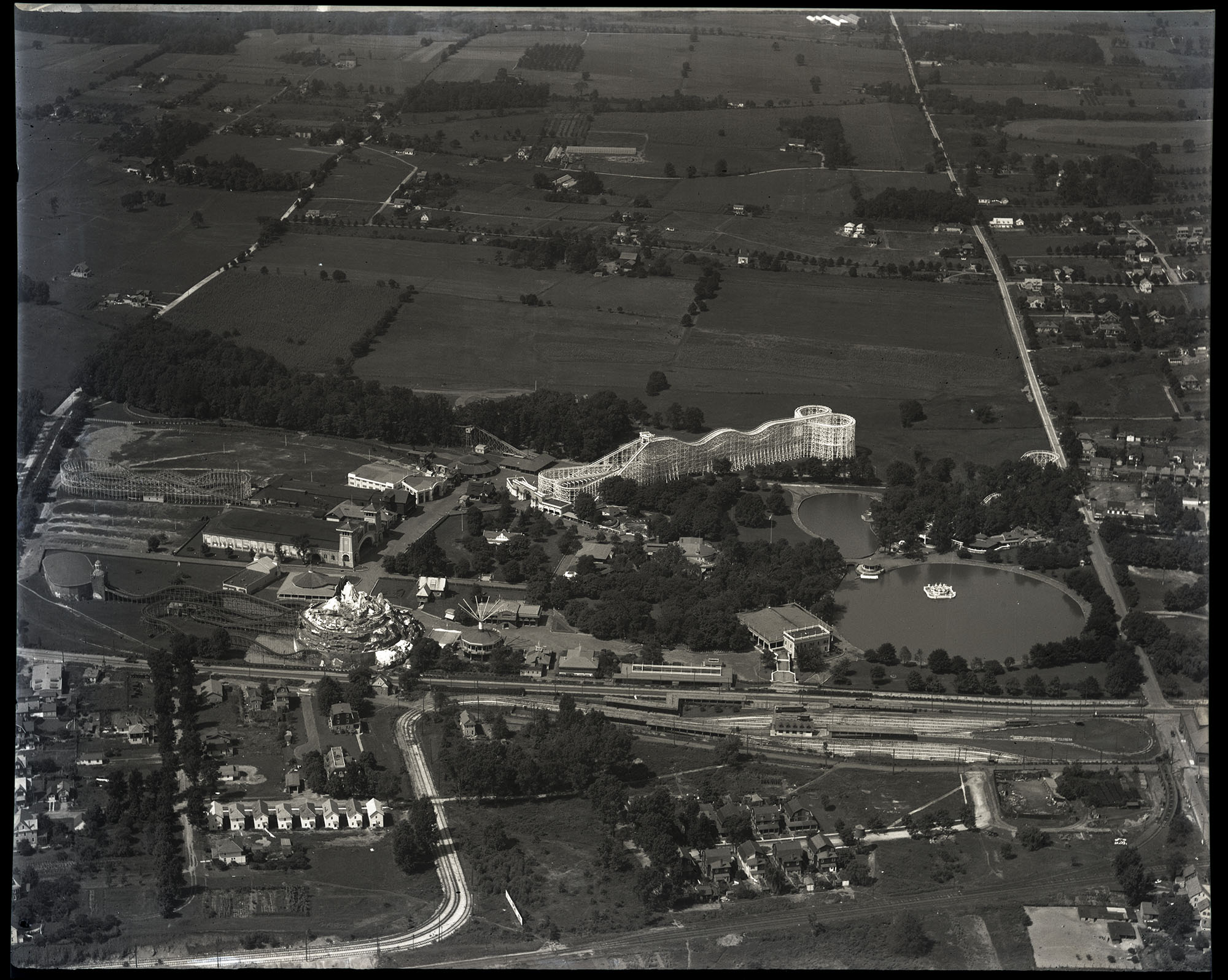
Aerial view of Willow Grove Park in 1926

The park originally was conceived by one of the three Philadelphia area traction companies, People's Traction Company, as a means to encourage weekend customers on the trolley line, a practice that led to the coining of the term trolley park. The park's management imposed a strict dress code and relatively high prices to attract a "better class" of customer.

Starting in the 1900s, the park was served by the Philadelphia Rapid Transit Company's Route 6 streetcar line through Glenside. Streetcar service to the park ended in 1958 when the Pennsylvania Highway Department acquired a portion of the route for construction of the Pennsylvania Route 309 Expressway.

One of the biggest attractions in the park was the music pavilion, at which John Philip Sousa and his band played several times between 1901 and 1926. The pavilion was demolished in March 1959.

The park operated under the name Six Gun Territory from 1972 until its closure. The park's closure was announced in April 1976, and it sat vacant for several years until the land was cleared for a large shopping mall known as Willow Grove Park Mall, which opened in August 1982. The mall pays homage to its predecessor by displaying banners and other objects which hark back to the land's days as an amusement park. A merry-go-round built and installed in 2001 operates within the mall.

== In popular culture ==
The park is referred to by Claudette Colbert in the 1934 film She Married Her Boss.

James A. Michener wrote a novel in 1949 entitled The Fires of Spring, telling the story of a young orphan boy named David Harper growing up in a poorhouse in Doylestown, Pennsylvania, which is near Willow Grove Park. Harper works at an amusement park named "Paradise" which is loosely based on Michener's own experiences as a young man when he worked at Willow Grove Park.

In 1973, the grounds were used in the film Malatesta's Carnival of Blood.

A documentary of the park was created in 1991, titled Life was a Lark at Willow Grove Park.

In season one, episode three (“New Frontier”) of the 2002 television show American Dreams, Willow Grove Park was mentioned, along with one of its roller coasters, by Helen Pryor to Will at the end of the episode.

A book from Arcadia Publishing released in 2005 entitled Willow Grove Park includes over 200 photos of the park, and is the only comprehensive history of the park to receive publication.

Bill Cosby wrote and performed a stand-up routine called "Roland and the Rollercoaster", describing a childhood ride on the roller coaster at Willow Grove Park.
