= Altoona Curve =

- Founded in 1998; Altoona, Pennsylvania

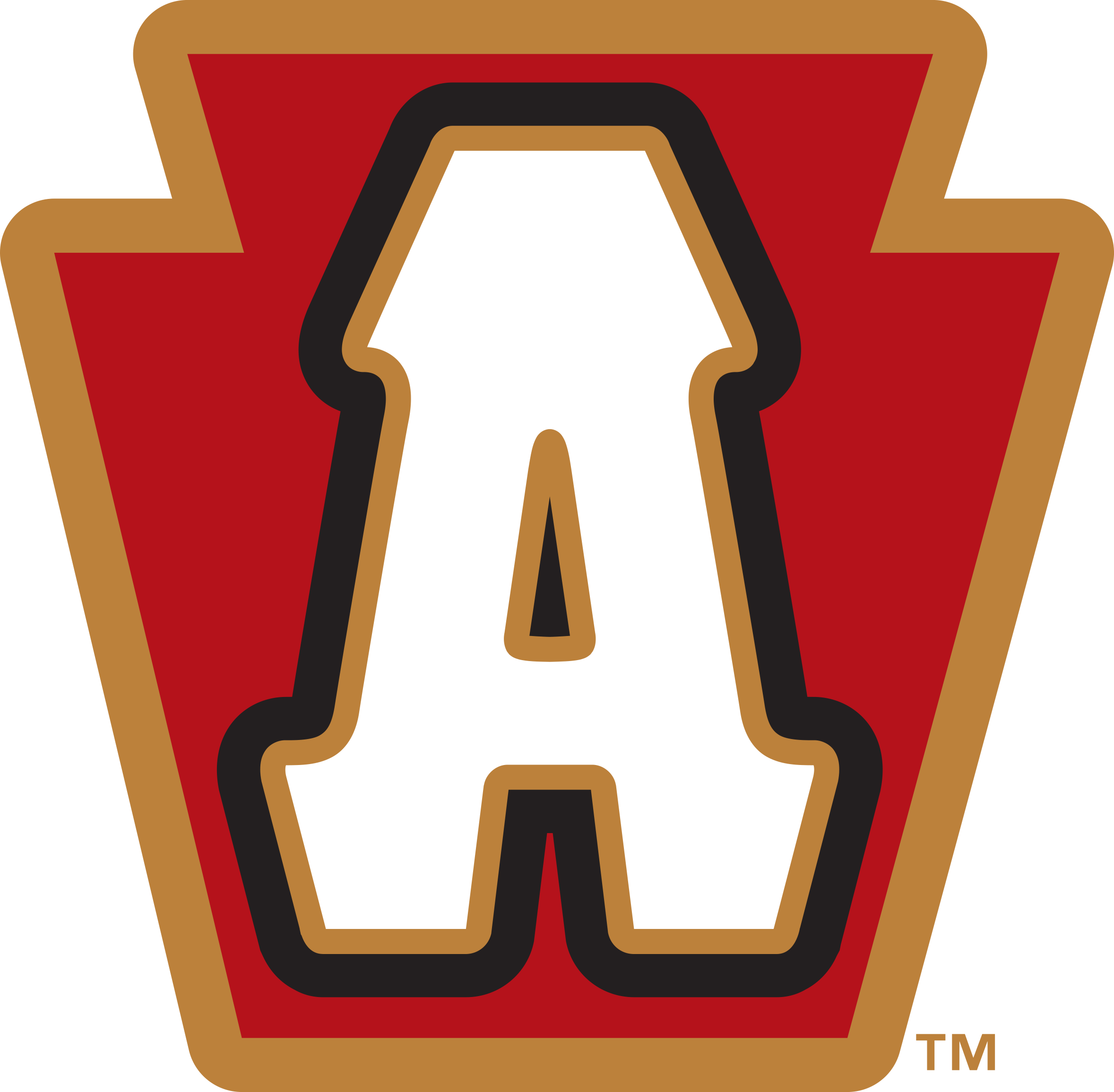
Team logo	Cap insignia

Minor league affiliations
- Class: Double-A (1999–present)
- League: Eastern League (1999–present)
- Division: Southwest Division

Major league affiliations
- Team: Pittsburgh Pirates (1999–present)

Minor league titles
- League titles (2): 2010; 2017
- Division titles (4): 2004; 2010; 2017; 2018
- Second-half titles (1): 2025

Team data
- Name: Altoona Curve (1999–present)
- Colors: Railroad red, soot black, boiler bronze, charcoal gray, white, tan
- Mascots: Loco, Al Tuna, Trax
- Ballpark: Peoples Natural Gas Field (1999–present)
- Owner/ Operator: Diamond Baseball Holdings
- General manager: Nate Bowen
- Manager: Andy Fox
- Website: milb.com/altoona

The Altoona Curve are a Minor League Baseball team based in Altoona, Pennsylvania. They are named after the nearby Horseshoe Curve, and the name also alludes to the curveball, a type of pitch. The team plays in the Eastern League and is the Double-A affiliate of the Pittsburgh Pirates. The Curve play in Peoples Natural Gas Field, located in Altoona; it was opened in 1999 and seats 7,210 people.

== History ==
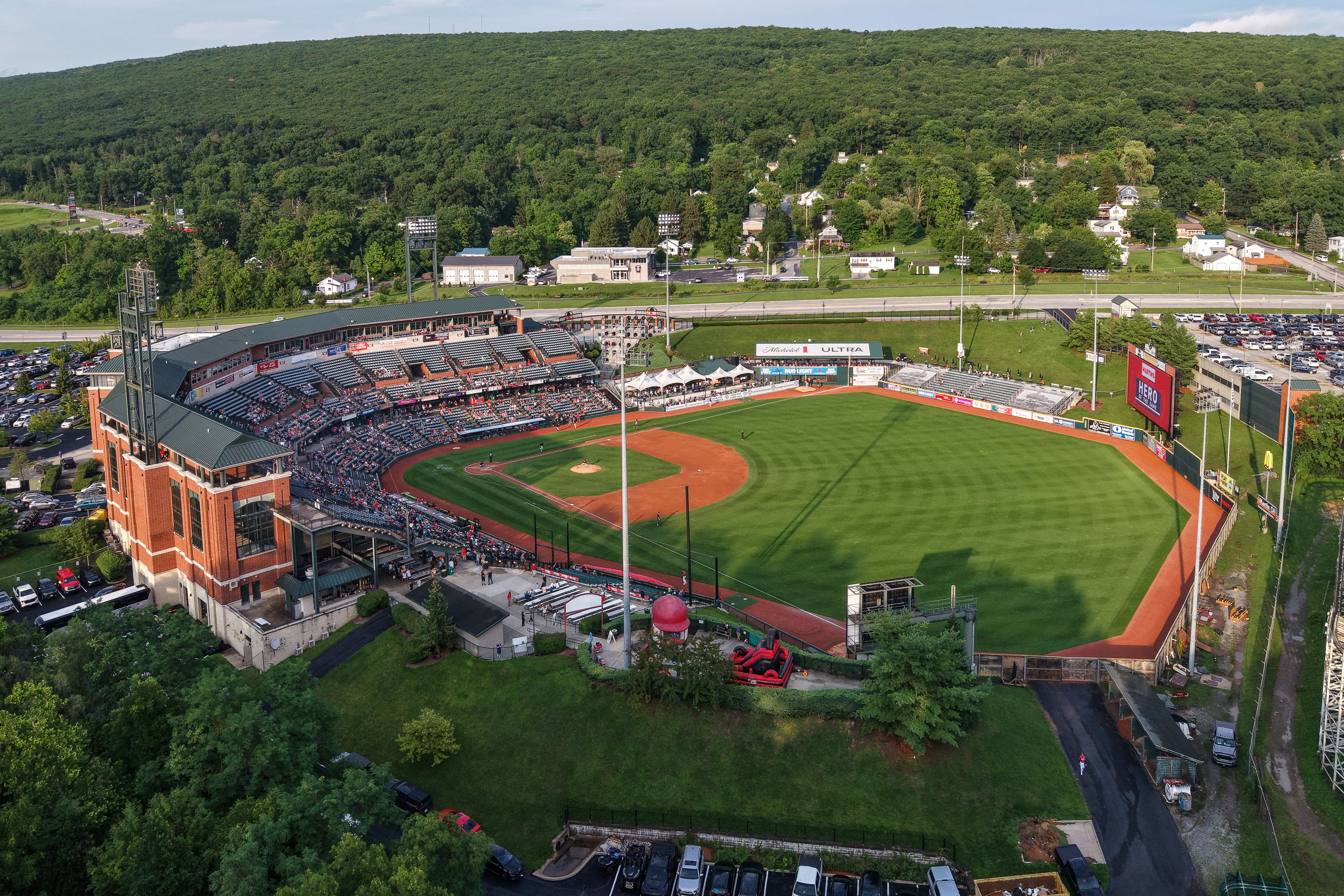
Peoples Natural Gas Field during a game

The Altoona Curve franchise began when Arizona and Tampa Bay were both awarded Major League Baseball franchises beginning in the 1998 season. The addition of these two teams had a domino effect through baseball with the expansion of not only the major leagues, but throughout Minor League Baseball as well. With this expansion, AA baseball received two new teams to begin play in the 1999 season. The Erie SeaWolves were already an established minor-league team with outstanding short-season attendance, and were quickly awarded one of the new franchises. The second spot in the new, larger Eastern League looked to be headed to Springfield, Massachusetts, but city native Bob Lozinak, developer Tate DeWeese, businessman Mark Thomas and a group of Pennsylvania lawmakers rallied to get the final spot, making a formal presentation to league officials on October 5, 1997. The proposal received unanimous support and Altoona won the other franchise.

Groundbreaking on Blair County Ballpark took place on March 7, 1998, and the franchise was formally awarded in April. In June of that year, the "Curve" nickname was selected over several other proposals, including Lake Monsters, Ridge Runners, and the Altoona Fish. The name was inspired by nearby Horseshoe Curve, with many of the logos inspired by the former Pennsylvania Railroad which housed their maintenance facility in Altoona.

The next step for the start of the Altoona Curve was to find a major league affiliate. The Erie SeaWolves had already had several successful seasons in the Pirates' organization, as a short-season single-A affiliate. In the end, however, the Pirates chose Altoona for their AA affiliate.

The Altoona Curve began their first season on the road at the Reading Phillies on April 9, 1999. Their first game was suspended by rain and completed the next day as part of a doubleheader. That first game was a 6–2 loss, but the Curve scored their first-ever victory in the second game, beating Reading 6–4. A few days later, on April 15, the Curve christened Blair County Ballpark by defeating the Bowie Baysox 6–1 in front of a crowd of 6,171.

On April 2, 2002, Lozinak and DeWeese sold the franchise to a collective headed by Pittsburgh attorney Chuck Greenberg. Among the partners in the collective are Pittsburgh Steelers running back Jerome Bettis and NHL star Mario Lemieux. The first season under new ownership was the most successful to date, performance-wise as well as economically. During August of that year, the Pirates signed on for another four-year development agreement through the 2006 season.

During the 2003 season, the Curve made the Eastern League playoffs for the first time, and followed that up with two more appearances in 2004 and 2005. Their performance on the field has led to increased numbers in the stands, and the Curve increased attendance for five consecutive years before dipping by just a few thousand in 2005.

Following the 2004 season, General Manager Todd Parnell was honored as the Eastern League Executive of the Year, and the franchise won the Larry MacPhail Award for the best promotional effort (on and off the field) in all of Minor League Baseball.

On April 2, 2006, their fourth anniversary as owners, Greenberg and his group announced an additional four-year extension on the development agreement with the Pirates, keeping the Curve's affiliation intact through at least the 2010 season. The Curve hosted the Eastern League All-Star Game at Blair County Ballpark on July 12, 2006, before a standing-room-only crowd of 9,308.

On December 2, 2008, Chuck Greenberg sold the Altoona Curve back to original owner and Altoona native Bob Lozinak.

On May 23, 2009, the Altoona Curve and Pittsburgh Pirates renewed their development agreement, which now runs through the 2014 season.

On September 18, 2010, the Curve defeated the Trenton Thunder to clinch the franchise's first ever Eastern League Championship. The Curve won the series three games to one. Later that month, it was announced that the Pirates would not be bringing back Altoona manager Matt Walbeck for the following season.

In 2016, four Curve players were picked for the Eastern League All-Star Game—Tyler Eppler, Edwin Espinal, Jared Lakind, and Harold Ramírez. The Altoona Curve won their second Eastern League Championship in 2017, sweeping the Trenton Thunder in three games.

In conjunction with Major League Baseball's restructuring of Minor League Baseball in 2021, the Curve were organized into the Double-A Northeast. In 2022, the Double-A Northeast became known as the Eastern League, the name historically used by the regional circuit prior to the 2021 reorganization.

=== No-hitters ===
On April 23, 2002, Adrian Burnside, Neal McDade and Chris Spurling combined for the first no-hitter in Altoona Curve history. Burnside pitched the first five innings, McDade pitched the next three and Spurling pitched the ninth inning to complete the no-hitter. On July 25, 2013, Ethan Hollingsworth, Jason Townsend, Jhonathan Ramos and Ryan Beckman combined for the second no-hitter in Altoona Curve history. Hollingsworth pitched the first four innings, Townsend pitched the next three, Ramos pitched the eighth inning and Beckman pitched the ninth to complete the no-hitter.

== Season records ==
(Place listed is finish in Southern Division from 1999 to 2009, Western Division from 2010 to 2020, and Southwest Division from 2021 to present day)

- 1999: 67–73 (6th), manager Marty Brown
- 2000: 74–68 (4th), manager Marty Brown
- 2001: 63–79 (5th), manager Dale Sveum
- 2002: 72–69 (4th), manager Dale Sveum
- 2003: 78–63 (2nd), manager Dale Sveum
- 2004: 85–56 (1st), manager Tony Beasley
- 2005: 77–65 (2nd), manager Tony Beasley
- 2006: 75–64 (2nd), manager Tim Leiper
- 2007: 73–68 (3rd), manager Tim Leiper
- 2008: 65–77 (5th), manager Tim Leiper
- 2009: 62–80 (6th), manager Matt Walbeck
- 2010: 82–60 (1st), manager Matt Walbeck
- 2011: 64–77 (6th), manager P. J. Forbes
- 2012: 72–70 (3rd), manager P. J. Forbes
- 2013: 63–79 (6th), manager Carlos García
- 2014: 61–81 (5th), manager Carlos García
- 2015: 74–68 (2nd), manager Tom Prince
- 2016: 76–64 (2nd), manager Joey Cora
- 2017: 74–66 (1st), manager Michael Ryan
- 2018: 78–60 (1st), manager Michael Ryan
- 2019: 69–71 (4th), manager Michael Ryan
- 2020: Season canceled due to COVID-19 pandemic
- 2021: 58–59 (5th), manager Miguel Perez
- 2022: 71–66 (3rd), manager Miguel Perez
- 2023: 67–68 (3rd), manager Callix Crabbe
- 2024: 62–76 (6th), manager Robby Hammock
- 2025: 69–68 (3rd), manager Andy Fox
- 2026: 61–77 (6th), manager Andy Fox

== Playoff appearances ==
- 2003 season: Lost to Akron 3–1 in Southern Division Championship Series.
- 2004 season: Defeated Erie 3–0 in Southern Division Championship Series; lost to New Hampshire 3–0 in Eastern League Championship Series.
- 2005 season: Lost to Akron 3–2 in Southern Division Championship Series.
- 2006 season: Lost to Akron 3–2 in Southern Division Championship Series.
- 2010 season: Defeated Harrisburg 3–1 in Western Division Championship Series; defeated Trenton 3–1 in Eastern League Championship Series.
- 2015 season: Lost to Bowie 3–1 in Western Division Championship Series.
- 2016 season: Lost to Akron 3–1 in Western Division Championship Series.
- 2017 season: Defeated Bowie 3–0 in Western Division Championship Series; defeated Trenton 3–0 in Eastern League Championship Series.
- 2018 season: Lost to Akron 3–1 in Western Division Championship Series.
- 2025 season: Lost to Erie 2–1 in Southwestern Division Championship Series.

== Roster ==
Altoona Curve roster
Players	Coaches/Other
Pitchers: 43 Matt Ager; 35 Jarod Bayless; 45 Po-Yu Chen; 19 Jaycob Deese; 22 Claudio Estelie; 53 Dariel Francia; 24 Yonleg Gaetano; 18 Joshua Loeschorn; -- Andrew Moore; 17 Connor Oliver; 18 Tyler Owens; 36 Dominic Pipkin; 7 Jake Shirk; 34 Aaron Shortridge; 44 Peyton Stumbo; 13 Sean Sullivan; Catchers: 28 Easton Carmichael; 10 Samuel Escudero; 32 Camden Janik; Infielders: 2 Keiner Delgado; 23 Murf Gray; 5 Matt King; 47 Ryan McCarty; 25 Callan Moss; 12 Javier Rivas; Outfielders: 38 Ivan Brethowr; 27 Titus Dumitru; 46 Will Taylor; 3 Lonnie White	Manager: 49 Andy Fox; Coaches: 48 Gary Green (bench); 15 Justin Orton (hitting); 30 David Perez (pitching); 50 Scott Seabol (hitting); 45 Kevin Walker (pitching); 60-day injured list: -- Alessandro Ercolani (full season); -- Garrett McMillan (full season); -- Dominic Perachi (full season); -- Anthony Solometo (full season); 7-day injured list; * On Pittsburgh Pirates 40-man roster; ~ Development list; # Rehab assignment; ∞ Reserve list; ‡ Restricted list; § Suspended list; † Temporarily inactive list; Roster updated September 20, 2026; Transactions; → More rosters: MiLB • Eastern League; → Pittsburgh Pirates minor league players

== Stadium ==
The Curve have played at Peoples Natural Gas Field, formerly known as Blair County Ballpark, since the club's inception in 1999. The stadium's current seating capacity is 7,210.
