= Delmar Loop–Parkview Gardens Historic District =

- Delmar Loop-Parkview Gardens Historic District
- U.S. National Register of Historic Places
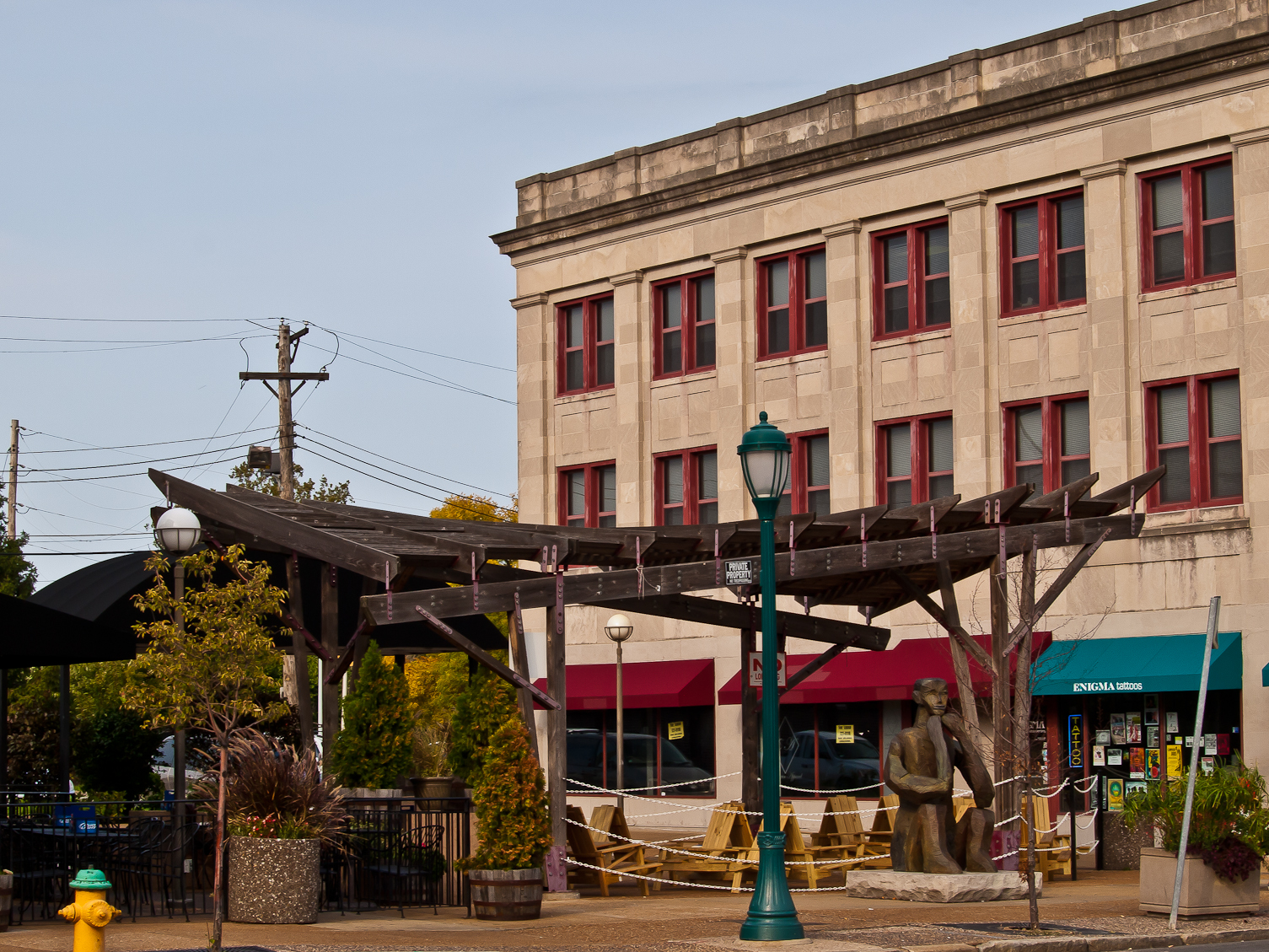

- Location within Missouri Location within the United States
- Location: Roughly bounded by Kingsland Ave., North Dr., Delmar Blvd., and Eastgate, University City, Missouri
- Coordinates: 38°39′21″N 90°18′15″W
- Area: 84 acres (34 ha)
- Built: 1911
- Built by: Multiple
- Architectural style: Bungalow/craftsman, Tudor Revival, Georgian Revival
- NRHP reference No.: 84002624
- Added to NRHP: February 16, 1984

The Delmar Loop–Parkview Gardens Historic District is a historic district in University City, Missouri and St. Louis, Missouri. It is roughly bounded by Kingsland Ave., North Dr., Delmar Blvd., and Eastgate. It was listed on the National Register of Historic Places in 1984. The listing included 289 contributing buildings.

It includes two apartment subdivisions and an adjacent commercial area.
