= Angela Park (amusement park) =

Former amusement park in Drums, Pennsylvania

- Interactive map of Angela Park
- Location: Drums, Pennsylvania
- Coordinates: 41.035°N 75.951°W
- Status: Defunct
- Opened: 1957
- Closed: 1988
- Owner: Mirth Master Corporation

Angela Park was an amusement park located along PA Route 309 in Drums, Pennsylvania. The park operated from 1957 through 1988. It was owned and operated by the Barletta Family until 1985, when it was sold to Mirth Master Corporation of Chester County, Pennsylvania, who operated the park until 1988. After the 1988 season, the owners filed for bankruptcy. In 1990, the rides and equipment were auctioned off. During the late 1990s, many of the buildings were razed. During the 2000s, the property served as a training field for Lackawanna College's training program for Lackawanna County police. Today, the property is owned by New Land Development of Lackawanna County and is undeveloped. The park's sole roller coaster was called Valley Volcano, and it was designed by John C. Allen.

== 1950s ==
Angeline Barletta, the matriarch of the Barletta family, operated several successful businesses in the Hazleton region. During the 1940s, the family purchased several hundred acres of land along the Nescopeck Creek in the Butler Valley, part of which was developed into a grove for the family to spend weekends at. Barletta often spoke of developing the land into an amusement park. After she died unexpectedly in 1952, her family decided to follow through with her idea. Planning and construction began in 1955, and by the spring of 1957, Angela Park opened, named in honor of Barletta. The original owners were husband Anthony Barletta, sons Frank, Rocco, James, Joseph, Maurice, John and Fred, and their brother-in-law John DePierro. With the exception of their father Anthony, who died in 1960, this partnership would remain intact until 1985. Angela Park was one of several businesses owned and operated by the Barletta family during this time.

Angela Park opened on May 12, 1957. In its first year of operation, the park had only six rides, four of which were designed exclusively for younger children: the Allan Herschell Company Tank Ride, Boat Ride, carousel, and Airplanes. The other two were the miniature train and a roller coaster. Several cinder block buildings were erected, serving picnic groves and game houses.

For the 1958 season, two additional rides were added: the Panther Car ride and the Dodgem ride. The size of the park expanded with the addition of an Olympic-size swimming pool, the largest such facility in northeastern Pennsylvania. Also added was a stage area at the eastern end of the park. Television personality Pinky Lee would become the first of several nationally known acts to perform at Angela Park. A record-setting crowd gathered on July 29, 1959, to see Buffalo Bob Smith and the Howdy Doody Show perform.

== 1960s ==
The early 1960s saw more additions to the park. A miniature golf course and a batting cage were added. The Saturday Night Swingout, a weekly dance party broadcast live on WAZL radio, was introduced. Frontline entertainment attractions continued as WFIL Philadelphia television personalities Sally Starr and Chief Halftown performed in 1960. Popular regional live bands made weekly appearances both on stage and for after-dark pool parties. Groups like Mel Wynne, Amazing Rhythm Aces, Ognir, and Night People drew large crowds of teens. Popular polka bands like Lefty, Polka Chaps, Stanky, and Coal Miners drew large adult crowds for Sunday performances.

During the mid-1960s, several new rides were added including Teacups (1961), Paratrooper (1965), Giant Slide (1966), Sky Ride (1967) and Swingin' Gyms (1967). In 1967, Art Holler was hired to replace Joe Barletta as park manager. Holler managed the park for two seasons before resigning. He was replaced by John Barletta, who was assisted by his sister Anna DePierro. The two ran the park until the family sold the business following the 1984 season.

== 1970s ==
In 1970, a golf driving range was constructed. That same year, an authentic 1939 fire engine was purchased, and converted to give rides around the park. In 1971, the Midway kiddie ride was added, and the original Paratrooper ride was replaced with a more modern version. In 1972, the Satellite Jet ride was added and the original miniature train was replaced by a larger C.P. Huntington train. In June 1972, Nescopeck Creek flooded during Tropical Storm Agnes. The flood waters damaged the picnic grove area, the golf driving range, and the parking area with over 6-foot-deep (1.8 m) of water. In the mid-1970s, Swingin' Gyms was dismantled and sold. The Tilt-A-Whirl ride and the Columbus ride were introduced; the last two rides to be added to the park. In 1976, the golf driving range was converted to a lighted softball field.

== 1980s ==
The park experienced few changes in the 1980s. When Pennsylvania state law initiated in 1980 banned the hosting of bingo games by profit organizations, the popular Sunday bingo games ended at Angela Park. The bingo building was converted into a haunted house ride that never gained popularity. The Barletta family opened the nearby Edgewood-in-the-Pines Golf Course in the fall of 1979, and within the next two years, they advertised the availability of Angela Park for sale. During the 1984 season, a serious offer to purchase the park was made by Joseph Filoromo of Downingtown, Pennsylvania. Along with his mother, they formed the Mirth Master Corporation, and they purchased Anglea Park for $1.2 million in 1985. During the next four years, Mirth Master Corporation fell into worsening financial condition, and by 1988 the park was over $1 million in debt.

Mirth Master Corporation declared bankruptcy in the spring of 1989, leaving Filoromo with no choice but to close the park. A bank seized the property and put the park up for sale at $2 million. Despite local efforts to raise the capital to purchase the operations, no buyer emerged. In May of 1990, the bank auctioned off everything left in the park. Several of the Angela Park rides are in operation in different locations. The C.P. Huntington miniature train was sold to the Erie Zoo in Erie, Pennsylvania. The tank ride is located in Knight's Action Park in Springfield, Illinois. The antique car ride is located in a New Jersey park, and several of the Dodgem bumper cars operate at Knoebels Amusement Resort in Elysburg, Pennsylvania.

== Documentary ==
In 2016, Sam-Son Productions, Inc. announced that they would be creating a documentary on the park. The documentary was completed in 2017. The hour-long documentary DVD features footage from the park's opening day through its closure. The documentary also features interviews with some of the park owners and their children (who also worked in the park), as well as other former employees and parkgoers.
