= John C. Allen =

American roller coaster designer

- Born: May 21, 1907; Philadelphia, Pennsylvania
- Died: August 17, 1979 (aged 72)
- Occupation: Roller coaster designer
- Years active: 1934–1979
- Known for: Philadelphia Toboggan Company manufacturers

John C. Allen (May 21, 1907 – August 17, 1979) was a roller coaster designer who was responsible for the revival of wooden roller coasters which began in the 1960s. He attended Drexel University. He started working for the Philadelphia Toboggan Company in 1934 as a coaster operator and rose to become president of the company by 1954. He designed more than 25 coasters and made significant contributions to roller coaster technology. He once said, "You don't need a degree in engineering to design roller coasters, you need a degree in psychology."

== List of roller coasters ==
The following is a list of roller coasters were credited as designed by John C. Allen:

Name	Location	Built	Status
Nightmare	Joyland	1949	Demolished
Jet Flyer/Sea Dragon	Gooding Zoo Park/Wyandot Lake/Jungle Jack's Landing/Adventure Cove)	1956	Operating
Valley Volcano	Angela Park	1956	Demolished
Flyer	Dinosaur Beach	1957	Demolished
Ghost Town Jet / Mighty Lightnin' / Comet	Rocky Glen Park	1959	Demolished
Skyliner	Lakemont Park	1960	Closed
Golden Nugget Mine/Black Diamond	Knoebels Amusement Resort	1960	Operating
Tornado	Wedgewood Village	1961	Demolished
Starliner	Miracle Strip/Cypress Gardens	1963	Demolished
Blue Streak	Cedar Point	1964	Operating
Jetstream	Riverview Park	1964	Demolished
Mr. Twister	Elitch Gardens	1965	Demolished
Skyliner	Fair Park	1965	Demolished
Swamp Fox	Grand Strand Park/Family Kingdom	1966	Operating
Cannon Ball	Lake Winnepesaukah	1967	Operating
Shooting Star	Lakeside Park	1968	Demolished
Zingo	Bell's Amusement Park	1968	Demolished
Tornado	Petticoat Junction	1970	Demolished
The Racer	Kings Island	1972	Operating
Woodstock Express	Kings Island	1972	Operating
Great American Scream Machine	Six Flags Over Georgia	1973	Operating
Comet	Funway Amusement Park	1973	Demolished
Woodstock Express	Kings Dominion	1974	Operating
Racer 75	Kings Dominion	1975	Operating
Woodstock Express	Carowinds	1975	Operating
Screamin' Eagle	Six Flags St. Louis	1976	Operating
