= Rides At Adventure Cove =

Amusement park

Rides at Adventure Cove
- Previously known as Gooding Zoo Park (1946-1984); Wyandot Lake (1984-2006); Jungle Jack's Landing (2008-2019)
- Interactive map of Rides at Adventure Cove
- Location: Powell, Ohio
- Coordinates: 40°9′21″N 83°7′11″W
- Opened: May 26, 2008
- Owner: Columbus Zoo and Aquarium
- Operating season: May to September
- Area: 11 acres (45,000 m^{2})

Attractions
- Total: 14
- Roller coasters: 2

Front sign from when the park used to be called Jungle Jack's Landing.

Rides at Adventure Cove is a small amusement park area that is part of and owned by the Columbus Zoo and Aquarium in Powell, Ohio. The park was originally part of Wyandot Lake before the zoo purchased the property in 2006, splitting it into two separate sections after the 2006 season. The water park became known as Zoombezi Bay while the dry ride area became Jungle Jack's Landing. The amusement park was named after zoo director emeritus Jack Hanna and opened on May 26, 2008. It debuted with 14 rides and attractions, several of which were retained from the former Wyandot Lake. In 2020, the Jungle Jack's Landing name was dropped with the amusement park area being renamed to tie into the neighboring Adventure Cove area of the Columbus Zoo and Aquarium which opened for the first time on the same year.

== Current rides and attractions ==
Rides at Adventure Cove currently features a collection of classic flat rides, a vintage wooden roller coaster, and a miniature railroad.

| Name | Manufacturer (Model) | Details | Opened | Ref |
|---|---|---|---|---|
| Dust Devil | Eli Bridge Company (Scrambler) | Classic Scrambler ride, originally manufactured in 1966. Part of original Wyandot Lake as "Neptune's Revenge". | <2006 | |
| Flying Clipper | Zamperla (Galleon Ship) | Swinging ship ride that swings approximately 50 feet (15 m) into the air. Holds up to 42 passengers at a time. | 2008 | |
| Golden Frog Hopper | Chance Rides (Frog Hopper) | 25-foot (7.6 m) tower ride. | 2008 | |
| Havoc Harbor | RDC (Bumper cars) | Bumper car attraction with unique circular, spinning bumper cars. Part of original Wyandot Lake. | <2006 | |
| Jack's Tea Party | Zamperla (Kiddie Tea Cups) | Miniature tea cup ride with six cups, accommodating a maximum of 24 passengers at a time. | 2008 | |
| Mission Macaw | Larson International (Flying Scooters) | Classic flying scooters attraction. | 2008 | |
| Safari Stampede | Bertazzon (Matterhorn) | "Matterhorn-style" ride with 16 vehicles, each holding one to two passengers.. | 2008 | |
| Sea Dragon | Philadelphia Toboggan Coasters (Wood Coaster) | Double out-and-back, figure-eight layout with a 37-foot (11 m) hill, 1,320 feet (400 m) of track, and speeds up to 25 miles per hour (40 km/h). The ride is recognized as an "ACE Coaster Classic" by American Coaster Enthusiasts and was designed by John Allen. Part of original Wyandot Lake and originally named "Jet Flyer". | 1956/1957 | |
| Swingin' Gibbons | Zamperla (Family Swinger) | A classic wave swinger style ride with 16 adult-sized swings and 26 child-sized swings. | 2008 | |
| Tidal Twist | Zamperla (Compact Twister Coaster) | A wild mouse-style spinning coaster that replaced the former Redwood Falls. | 2021 | |
| Tiny Town Train | Zamperla (Electric Kiddie Train) | Electric train with a locomotive, two tender cars, and a caboose. Capacity for up to 24 passengers at a time. | 2008 | |
| Tiny Tusks | Zamperla (Kiddie Flying Elephants) | "Dumbo" style flat ride with eight elephants, holding a maximum of 16 passengers. | 2008 | |

== Former rides and attractions ==
Some rides have been removed from the park including when the area was called Jungle Jack's Landing. Many other rides that were part of Wyandot Lake closed before Jungle Jack's Landing opened and thus are not included in the following list.

| Name | Manufacturer (Model) | Details | Opened | Closed | Ref |
|---|---|---|---|---|---|
| Adventure Wheel | Lamberink B.V. (Ferris Wheel) | 110-foot (34 m) ferris wheel with 24 gondolas. The ride was rented under a lease from May 27, 2023 through October 29, 2023. | 2023 | 2023 | |
| Falcon Fall | Moser Rides (Freefall) | 50-foot (15 m) tall free-fall ride that sent riders up and down repeatedly. | 2019 | 2025 | |
| Jungle Trek | Chance Rides | 1,200-foot (370 m) car ride. Removed for Zoombezi Bay expansion. Cars are now used as props around the zoo. | 2008 | 2010 | |
| Redwood Falls | Hafema | A 1,250-foot (380 m) log flume with a 28-foot (8.5 m) and a 36-foot (11 m) drop. A quarter of the ride's course was elevated 38 feet (12 m) in the air. It was demolished during the winter/spring of 2021. | 2008 | 2020 | |
| Sugar Glider | Hrubetz (Paratrooper) | Former traveling Paratrooper ride built on former location of Whirligigs. It was removed following the 2023 season. | 2019 | 2023 | |
| Whirligigs | Sellner Manufacturing (Tilt-a-Whirl) | Classic tilt-a-whirl. Relocated from Geauga Lake and relocated to Funtimes Fun Park (previously Caddie Shack) in Alliance, Ohio. Previously part of original Wyandot Lake. | 2008 | 2017 | |
