= Siu-Leung Lee =

Siu-Leung Lee (李兆良) is the President of Zheng He (Cheng Ho) Society of the Americas, Washington, DC, and editor of Midwestern Epigraphic Society in Columbus, Ohio.

Lee was born in Hong Kong on November 17, 1943. He attended the Chinese University of Hong Kong where he obtained a BSc degree in Biology and then attended Purdue University where he obtained a PhD degree in medical chemistry. Lee worked at Yale University and Texas A&M University before leaving academia to become a research scientist, first at Corning Inc. and then at Battelle Memorial Institute. He served as associate director of the Hong Kong Institute of Biotechnology and general manager of HKIB-Syntex Inc. In 1993 he founded Asiawind.com. He was director of the board of the Columbus Zoo and Aquarium from 2008 to 2010.

== Publications ==
- Lee, Siu-Leung. "China Mapped America Before 1430." ICC2017 Online Proceedings. Washington, DC, Jul 4, 2017.
- Lee, Siu-Leung. "Did Chinese Visit Pre-Columbian America? A Few Bones to Pick." Midwestern Epigraphic Society Newsletter 32, no. 1 (2015): 3–6.
- Lee, Siu-Leung. "Maps that turn world history upside down." Midwestern Epigraphic Society Journal (Midwestern Epigraphic Society) 26-29 (2015): 4-24.
- Lee, Siu-Leung. "Zheng He's voyages revealed by Matteo Ricci's world map." Chap. 15 in “Zheng He and the Afro-Asian World”, by Lin Sien Chia and Sally K. Church, edited by Lin Sien Chia and Sally K. Church, 307–335. Singapore: International Zheng He Society, 2012.
- Lee, Siu-Leung李兆良. “Kunyu Wanguo Quantu Yu Li Madou Zhongguo Zaji Zhongwai Yiben Kaoyi 坤舆万国全图与利玛窦中国札记中外译本考疑 [Kunyu Wanguo Quantu and translation of Matteo Ricci's China Journal].” Science of Surveying and Mapping 测绘科学 42, 5 (2017b): 35–43.
- Lee, Siu-Leung李兆良. “Huang He Gai Dao Yu Ditu Duandai:Zhongguo Dituxue Xichuan Bianzheng 黄河改道与地图断代：中国地图学西传辩证 [The Course of Yellow River and Map Dating].” 测绘科学 42, 4 (2017a): 1-9，16.
- 李兆良. 《坤輿萬國全圖解密 - 明代中國測繪世界》. (Kun Yu Wan Guo Quan Tu, the first Chinese world map, Linking Publishing Co, 2012. In Chinese). 台北: 聯經出版社, 2012. ISBN 9789570839760
- 李兆良. 《宣德金牌啟示錄-明代開拓美洲》. [Revelation of a Xuande medallion found in America – Ming Chinese contact with America, Linking Publishing Co, 2013. In Chinese.]. 台北: 聯經出版社, 2013. ISBN 9789570842838
- 李兆良. 《坤舆万国全图解密 - 明代中国与世界》. (Decoding Kunyu Wanguo Quantu: Ming China and the World), Shanghai Jiao Tong University Press. 2017. In Simplified Chinese font. 上海交通大學出版社, 2017. ISBN 9787313164032
- 李兆良. 中国发现澳洲 – 鹦哥地、厄蟆、火鸡的启示.. 海交史研究 61 (2012): 60–84.
- 李兆良. 坤舆万国全图资料源自中国 – 明代环球测绘世界（上）. 郑和研究 80, 编号 4 (2010): 14–20.
- 李兆良. 坤舆万国全图资料源自中国 – 明代环球测绘世界（下）. 郑和研究 81, 1 (2011): 14–21.
- Lee, Siu-Leung李兆良.明代中国人环球测绘《坤舆万国全图》—兼论《坤舆万国全图》的作者不是利玛窦. [Ming Chinese circumnavigation and mapped the world - Kunyu Wanguo Quantu not constructed by Matteo Ricci].Science of Surveying and Mapping测绘科学, 217 (7, 2016): 59–66.
- 李兆良. “郑和船队是否到过美洲.” 东方收藏 27 (2011): 24–26.
