= Sea Dragon (roller coaster) =

Wooden roller coaster at the Columbus Zoo, Ohio, United States

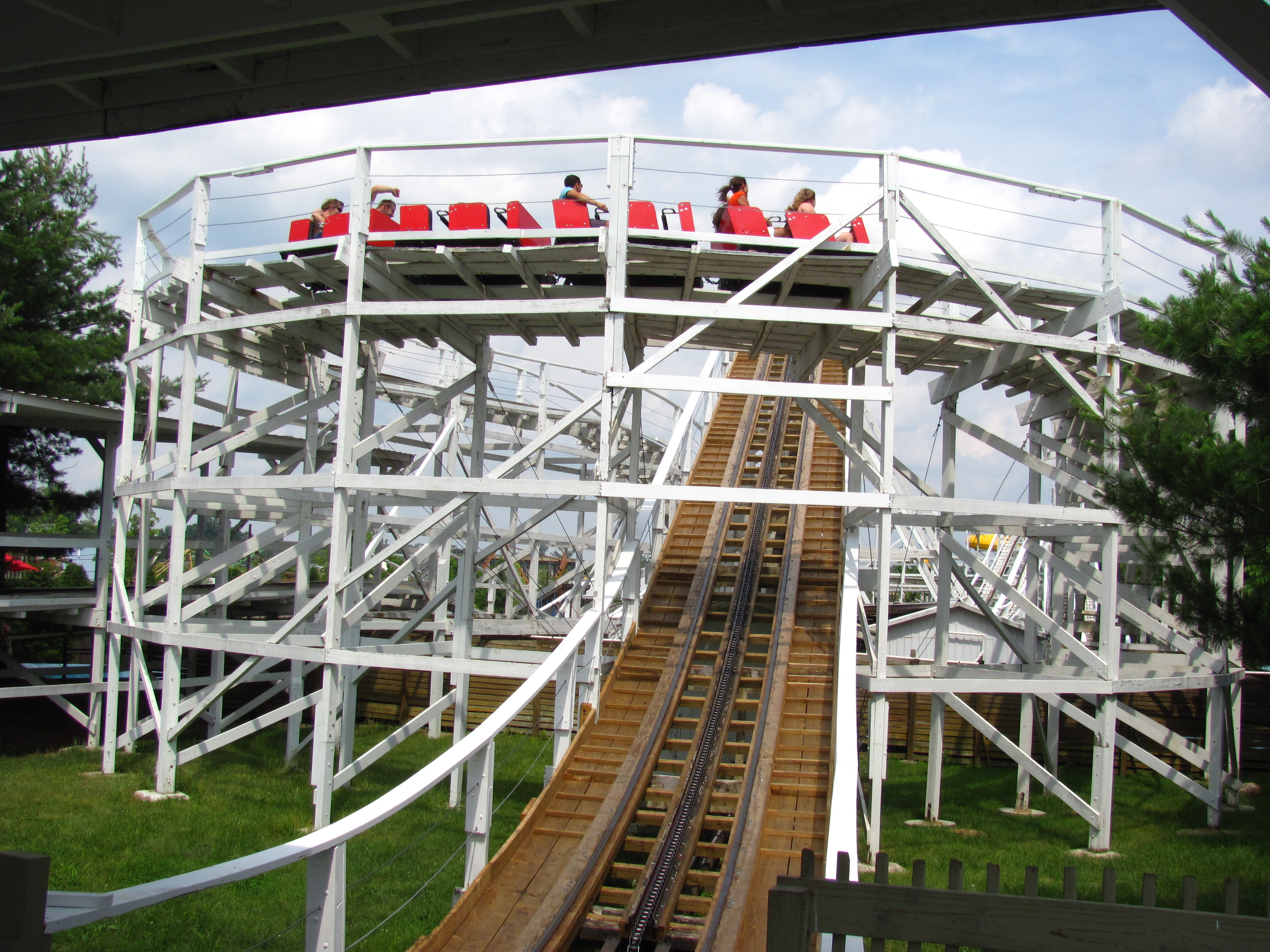

Rides At Adventure Cove
- Location: Rides At Adventure Cove
- Coordinates: 40.154398°N 83.120259°W
- Status: Operating
- Opening date: 1956

General statistics
- Type: Wood
- Manufacturer: Philadelphia Toboggan Coasters
- Designer: John C. Allen
- Track layout: Figure Eight
- Lift/launch system: Chain lift hill
- Height: 37 ft (11 m)
- Length: 1,320 ft (400 m)
- Speed: 25 mph (40 km/h)
- Inversions: 0
- Duration: 1:30
- Max vertical angle: 45°
- Capacity: 640 riders per hour
- Height restriction: 42 in (107 cm)
- Trains: Single train with 4 cars; riders arranged 2 across in 2 rows for a total of 16 riders per train
- Sea Dragon at RCDB

Sea Dragon is a junior wooden roller coaster located at the Columbus Zoo and Aquarium in Powell, Ohio. The ride is in the Rides At Adventure Cove section of the zoo. Built by Philadelphia Toboggan Coasters under famed designer John C. Allen, the roller coaster opened in 1956 as Jet Flyer. It was one of three junior wooden coasters that Allen designed shortly after becoming president of PTC in 1954 – the other two were Flyer at Hunt's Pier and Valley Volcano at Angela Park. They were based on earlier designs developed by roller doaster designer Herbert Schmeck, who was Allen's mentor. The ride became the Sea Dragon when the park reopened as Wyandot Lake in 1984.

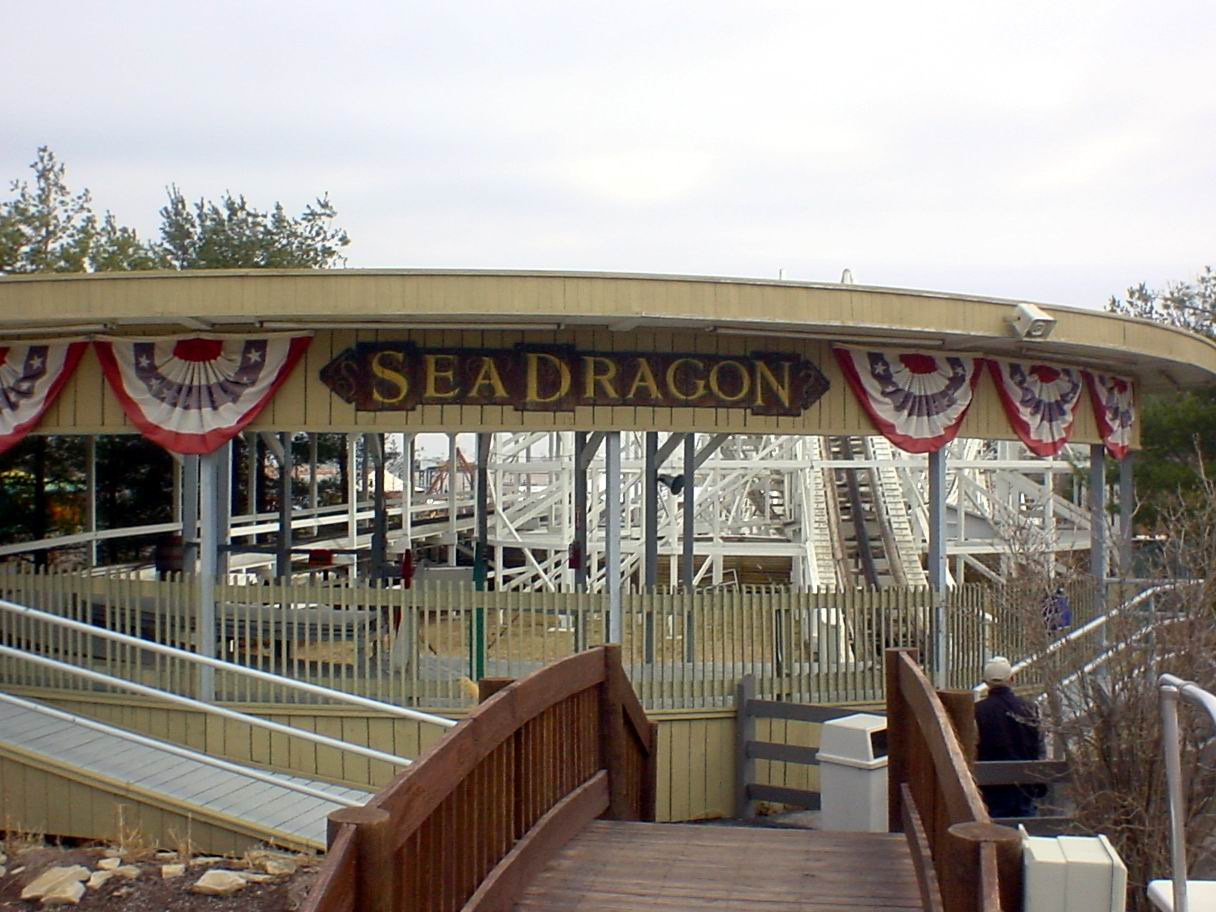
Sea Dragon's station

The coaster has one four-car train. Riders are seated two across with two rows per car, giving the coaster a capacity of 16 riders. Station brakes are manually operated using hand-controlled levers.

Following the dismantling of the other two coasters in the late 1980s, Sea Dragon became the oldest roller coaster from John Allen to remain in operation. Following the closure of Big Dipper in 2007, the Sea Dragon became the oldest operating wooden roller coaster in Ohio.
