= Zoombezi Bay =

Water park in Powell, Ohio

- Previously known as Zoo Park (1936–1984); Wyandot Lake (1984–2006)
- Interactive map of Zoombezi Bay
- Location: Powell, Ohio, United States
- Coordinates: 40.154896°N 83.119866°W
- Status: Operating
- Opened: 1937 (as Zoo Park); May 24, 1984 (as Wyandot Lake); May 26, 2008; 18 years ago (as Zoombezi Bay)
- Owner: Columbus Zoo and Aquarium
- Operating season: May to September
- Area: 22.7 acres (92,000 m^{2})

Attractions
- Water rides: 17
- Website: www.zoombezibay.com

Zoombezi Bay (/zuːmˌbiːzi ˈbeɪ/) is a 22.7-acre (9.2 ha) water park owned by the Columbus Zoo and Aquarium near Powell, Ohio, just north of Columbus. The park sits on the site of the former Wyandot Lake Adventure Park, which was purchased by the Columbus Zoo and Aquarium in 2006. Zoombezi Bay opened to the public on May 26, 2008, and currently ranks as one of the Midwest's most popular water parks, attracting more than 400,000 visitors annually.

== History ==
=== Wyandot Lake ===
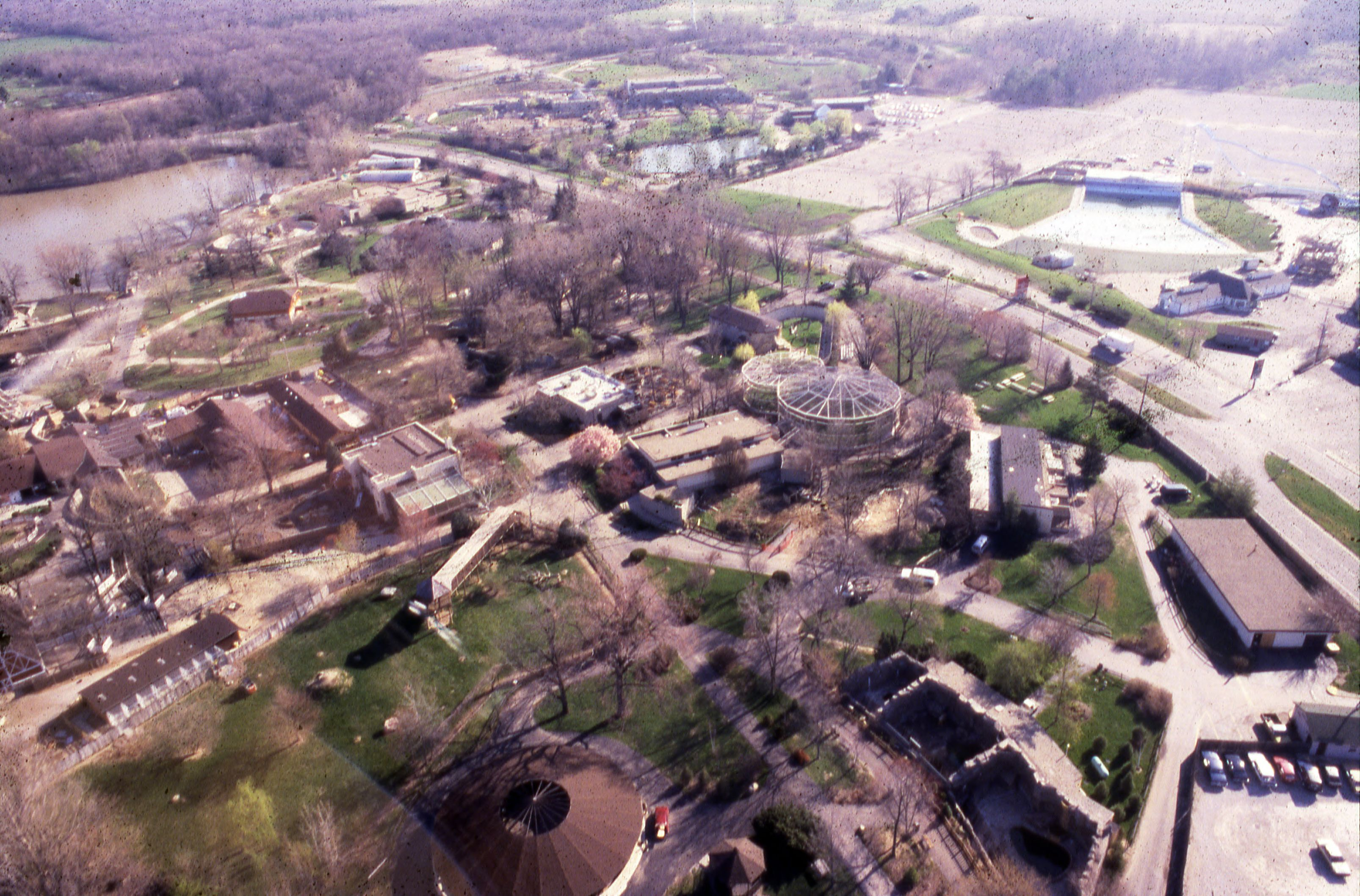
Aerial view of Columbus Zoo and Wyandot Lake Amusement Park, c. 1987

Wyandot Lake originally began as a Columbus trolley park named Olentangy Park in 1896. The park closed in 1937 to make room for an apartment complex and many rides were moved north to Zoo Park, owned by previous owners, Leo and Elmer Haenlein, located across from the Columbus Zoo in Powell. In 1956, Leo Haenlein died and the park was acquired by Floyd Gooding, a carnival operator. Gooding made many changes at the park, including dismantling the oldest Traver Circle Swing and adding the Jet Flyer, the Zoo Park's first roller coaster (later known as the Sea Dragon). Following Goodings's death in the 1970s, ownership was transferred to the City of Columbus, which leased the property to Ohio-based Funtime, Inc. in 1983. Construction soon began on Wyandot Lake Adventure Park, which officially opened on May 24, 1984. Funtime Inc. was then acquired by Premier Parks in 1995. Premier Parks, originally an Oklahoma-based real estate company named TierCo, ventured into the entertainment industry when it purchased the Frontier City theme park in 1983. It later acquired Six Flags in 1999, and changed its name to Six Flags Inc.

Wynadot Lake logo used under Six Flags ownership

Under new ownership, the amusement park continued to operate under the name Wyandot Lake. However, by 2003, Six Flags began experiencing financial difficulties, and began the process to sell multiple properties. In June 2006, the Columbus Zoo and Aquarium announced that it had entered an agreement with Six Flags to purchase Wyandot Lake for $2 million, which would be finalized later in the year. Six Flags – struggling with annual losses since 1999 – was eager to negotiate with the nearby zoo amid city plans to realign Powell Road, which would cut through a portion of Wyandot Lake. Shortly thereafter, the Zoo announced plans to invest nearly $45 million to substantially re-develop the former Wyandot Lake property. Officials projected that by expanding Wyandot Lake and operating it in tandem with the zoo, both facilities would become substantially more attractive, with the potential to produce more than $1.3 million in annual profit.

Wyandot Lake included both a dry amusement park area, as well as a full waterpark. Among the highlights of the amusement park was the Mangels-Illions Grand Carousel. The carousel was one of only a few manufactured by the William F. Mangels Company with wooden horses carved by M.C. Illions and Sons. In 1999, the carousel was removed from Wyandot Lake and underwent a one million dollar restoration before being moved to the Columbus Zoo and Aquarium.

Wyandot Lake's Wild Tides Wave Pool had a maximum depth of 9 feet.

Substantial portions of the former amusement park were incorporated into the Zoo, becoming Jungle Jack's Landing, Animal Encounters Village, and Colo's Cove Picnic Grove areas. An expanded parking lot and new entry plaza were also constructed, and a 22.7-acre (9.2 ha) parcel on the corner of Powell Road and Riverside Drive was set aside for a new water park.

=== Reconstruction ===
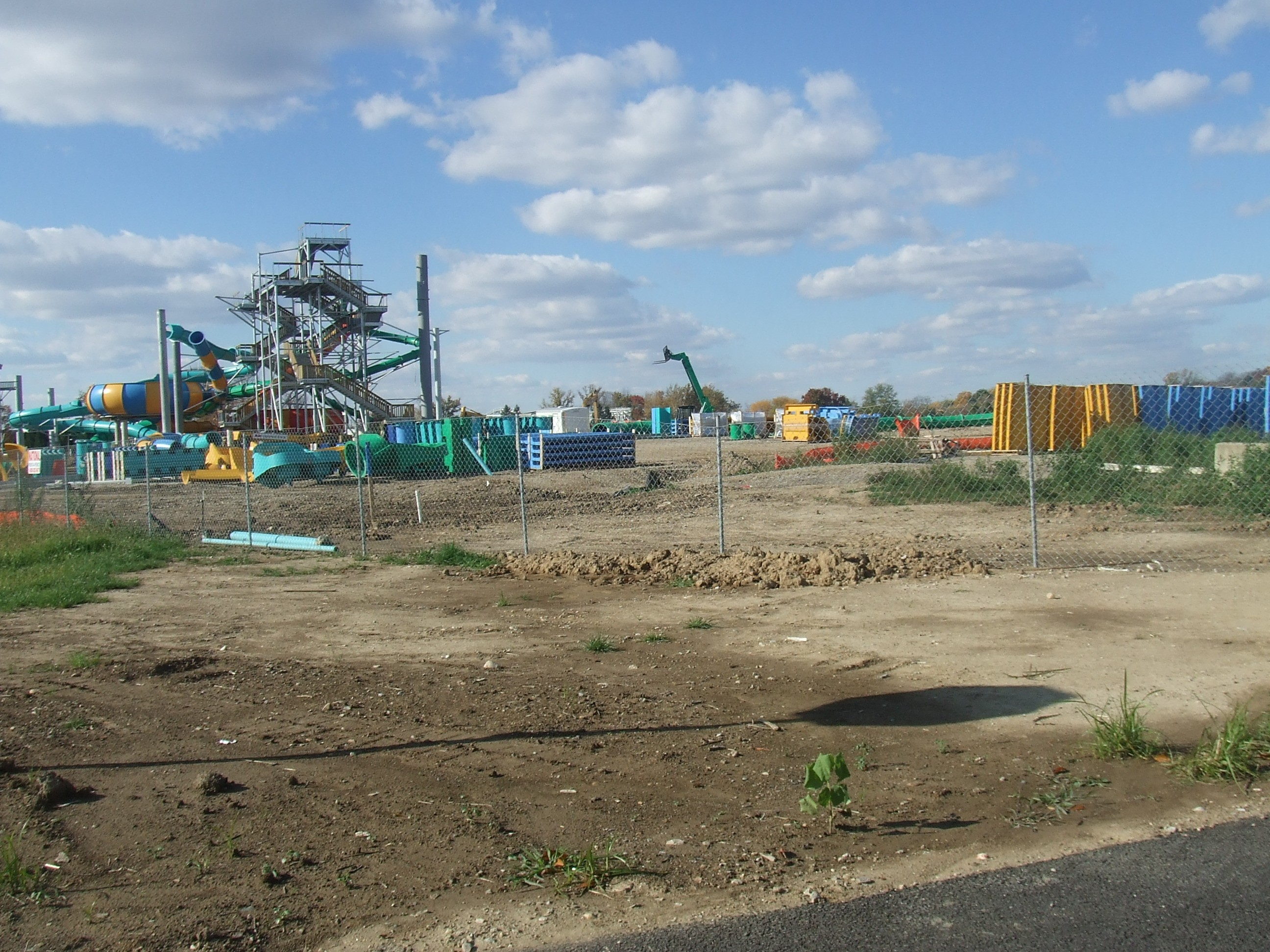
Construction of Zoombezi Bay in 2007

In October 2006, work began to remove the former picnic area and clear trees and other out-dated rides. Many older attractions and equipment were auctioned off. Wyandot Lake's popular "Jet Stream" and "Zuma Falls" water slides were purchased for $500 by The Beach Water Park, located in Mason, Ohio. Construction continued through the summer of 2007, with nearly all of the park's 22.7 acres (9.2 ha) undergoing a complete transformation. $20 million was invested to construct three new water slide complexes, along with a new 554,500 gallon wave pool and a 1,500 feet (460 m), 1.5 million gallon "Action River".

During the summer of 2007, an online contest was held to name the new water park. More than 3,000 people voted, and the name Zoombezi Bay was selected from a list that also included Kisawa Waves, Katoomba Lagoon, Kahuna Island, and Tahiti Waves.

By the time the park re-opened as Zoombezi Bay on May 26, 2008, only two attractions from the former Wyandot Lake remained within the water park. Christopher's Island was refurbished and renamed Barracuda Bay (2008-2013), while Canoochee Creek was renamed Croctail Creek and now serves as the park's adults-only lazy river. The park's former classic Sea Dragon roller coaster still stands along the park's perimeter, now serving as the signature attraction of the zoo's Rides At Adventure Cove area. Other former Wyandot Lake buildings can still be seen standing around the park's perimeter, but are now separated from the water park by fences and landscaping.

=== Growth and expansion ===
On December 5, 2010, during the Columbus Zoo and Aquarium's annual Jack Hanna's Into the Wildlights holiday television special, Columbus Zoo Executive Director Dale Schmidt announced Zoombezi Bay's first major expansion, which included the addition of two new water slides from manufacturer WhiteWater West. Python Plunge would be WhiteWater's first 45 feet (14 m) tall Master Blaster Express uphill water coaster, while Big Boa Falls represented WhiteWater's first Boomerango Express half-pipe tube slide. Both attractions opened to the public on May 21, 2011.

For the 2014 season, Zoombezi Bay announced that it would be retiring an attraction that represented childhood memories for many Central Ohioans. After 17 years of entertaining guests, Barracuda Bay (formerly Christopher's Island) was demolished to make room for an all-new, highly themed AquaPlay RainFortress from WhiteWater West. The new children's area, named Baboon Lagoon after the 16 lifelike baboons that can be seen climbing atop the structure, features nine new children's water slides, 90+ interactive water play features, heated water, and a giant orange octopus whose tentacles reach nearly 40 feet (12 m) in the air, dumping a giant 1,000 gallon bucket over the structure every 10 minutes. The new addition represented a $4.5 million investment for the property, making it one of the largest in the park's history. Baboon Lagoon opened to the public on May 17, 2014, and would go on to win an award for Best New Product in Themed Exhibit Design from the International Association of Amusement Parks and Attractions.

The highest attendance number that Zoombezi Bay ever achieved was in 2016 with 426,376 guests. The busiest month in Zoombezi Bay's history was also in 2016, when the waterpark welcomed 161,534 visitors in the month of June.

For the 2016 season, Zoombezi Bay transformed its former Tahitian Twister slide (which opened with the park in 2008) to a new slide, now known as the Soundsurfer, "The King of Beats". This new attraction features colorful LED lights, and also plays music that guests choose at the top of the tower before getting on the slide. The slide also went through a re-paint, and the slides new colors are orange and white, instead of the former colors, blue and black. These new features make this slide the first of its kind in America.

== Attractions ==
=== Current attractions ===
Name	Description	Height requirement	Manufacturer	Operated	Notes
Wild Tides Wave Pool	532,000 gallon wave pool with a maximum depth of six feet. Waves can reach up to four feet high.	Children 36" and smaller must wear a PFD unless accompanied within arms reach of a parent.	Aquatic Development Group	2008–present	
Roaring Rapids	570,000 gallons of water for 1,500 feet (460 m) at 32 inches deep and an average of 17 feet (5.2 m) wide.	Children 36" and smaller must wear a PFD unless accompanied within arms reach of a parent.	Aquatic Development Group	2008–present	
Baboon Lagoon	Custom-themed AquaPlay RainFortress, featuring 9 water slides, 90 interactive elements, heated pools, and a 1,000 gallon tipping bucket. Winner of 2014 IAAPA Best New Product in Themed Exhibit Design.	Slides: 36" or 42" depending on slide	WhiteWater West	2014–present	Replaces Barracuda Bay (1997-2013).
Tiny Tides	4,000-square-foot (370 m^{2}) shallow water (0" to 22" max depth) playground for smaller children. Located near Baboon Lagoon.	Under 36"		2008–present	Formerly known as Katoomba Lagoon (2008-2013).
Slippery Seals	Three unique body "speed slides". Part of the "Sea Splash" Complex.	48"	ProSlide Technology	2008–present	
Sea Snakes	One- or two-person raft slides starting from a 51-foot (16 m) tower with the premier attraction being a bowl shaped slide section where the rider slides around the side of the bowl in a circular motion. Part of the "Sea Splash" Complex.	48"	ProSlide Technology	2008–present	
Sea Tubes	One or two person serpentine raft slides from 51 feet (16 m). Part of the "Sea Splash" Complex.	48"	ProSlide Technology	2008–present	
Cyclone	Two- to four-person enclosed slide featuring a steep drop into a giant funnel.	48"-700 lb (320 kg) combined	ProSlide Technology	2008–present	
Soundsurfer	Five-person partially enclosed raft slide with colorful lights and music	48" or 42" and accompanied by an adult, 800 lb (360 kg) combined	ProSlide Technology	2016–present	First ever (outdoor) slide of its kind in the United States. (Was originally the Tahitian Twister from 2008-2015)
Big Boa Falls	Two person reverse freefall raft slide featuring a 30 feet (9.1 m) half-pipe adjacent to Python Plunge.	48"	WhiteWater West	2011–present	First Boomerango Express in the United States and one of only six Boomerango tube slides in the country.
Python Plunge	Two person uphill water coaster adjacent to Big Boa Falls.	48"	WhiteWater West	2011–present	First Master Blaster Express in the United States.
Sandbar at Croctail Creek	Adults-only area with sun deck, lounge space, and daiquiri bar, with swim-up access.	Age: 21+ only	Aquatic Development Group	2020–present	Replaced Croctail Island for the 2020 season.
Croctail Creek	Adults-only lazy river that surrounds a human-made island with wooden sun deck. A defining feature is the tunnel below the neighboring Sea Dragon wooden roller coaster. Croctail Creek received a full refurbishment for the 2020 season, with the entrance being relocated, and a new lounge pool and swim-up bar being added.	Age: 21+ only		1991–present	Formerly known as Canoochee Creek (1991-2006). Croctail Creek is the only attraction that allows patrons to consume alcohol while in the water. Fully refurbished for the 2020 season.
Sand Piper Splash	2 body slides that terminate in either a 4 foot or 6 foot drop. Part of the "Otter Banks" Complex	48"		2018–present	
Sea Challenge	Wibit water obstacle course. Part of the "Otter Banks" Complex	44"		2018–present	
Sand Dollar Shores	Zero depth entry pool with basketball area	Children 42" and smaller must wear a PFD unless accompanied within arms reach of a parent.		2018–present	
The Hive	One or two person raft slide where guests circle through 720 degree helixes. Part of the "Conservation Tower" Complex.	48" or 42" with supervising companion, 300 lbs single rider or 400 lbs double rider.	ProSlide Technology	2025-present	First waterslide of its kind in the world. Replaces Dolphin Dash (2008-2024)
Mussel Mayhem	One or two person raft slide where guests experience two halfpipe cutbacks and two funnel elements. Part of the "Conservation Tower" Complex.	48" or 42" with supervising companion, 300 lbs single rider or 400 lbs double rider.	ProSlide Technology	2025-present	First waterslide of its kind in the midwest. Replaces Dolphin Dash (2008-2024)
Captina Falls	Mat-racing slide where guests race side-by-side through enclosed tubes and FlyingSAUCER 8 features. Part of the "Conservation Tower" Complex.	42"	ProSlide Technology	2025-Present	The only waterslide of its kind in the world. Replaces Dolphin Dash (2008-2024)

=== Former attractions ===
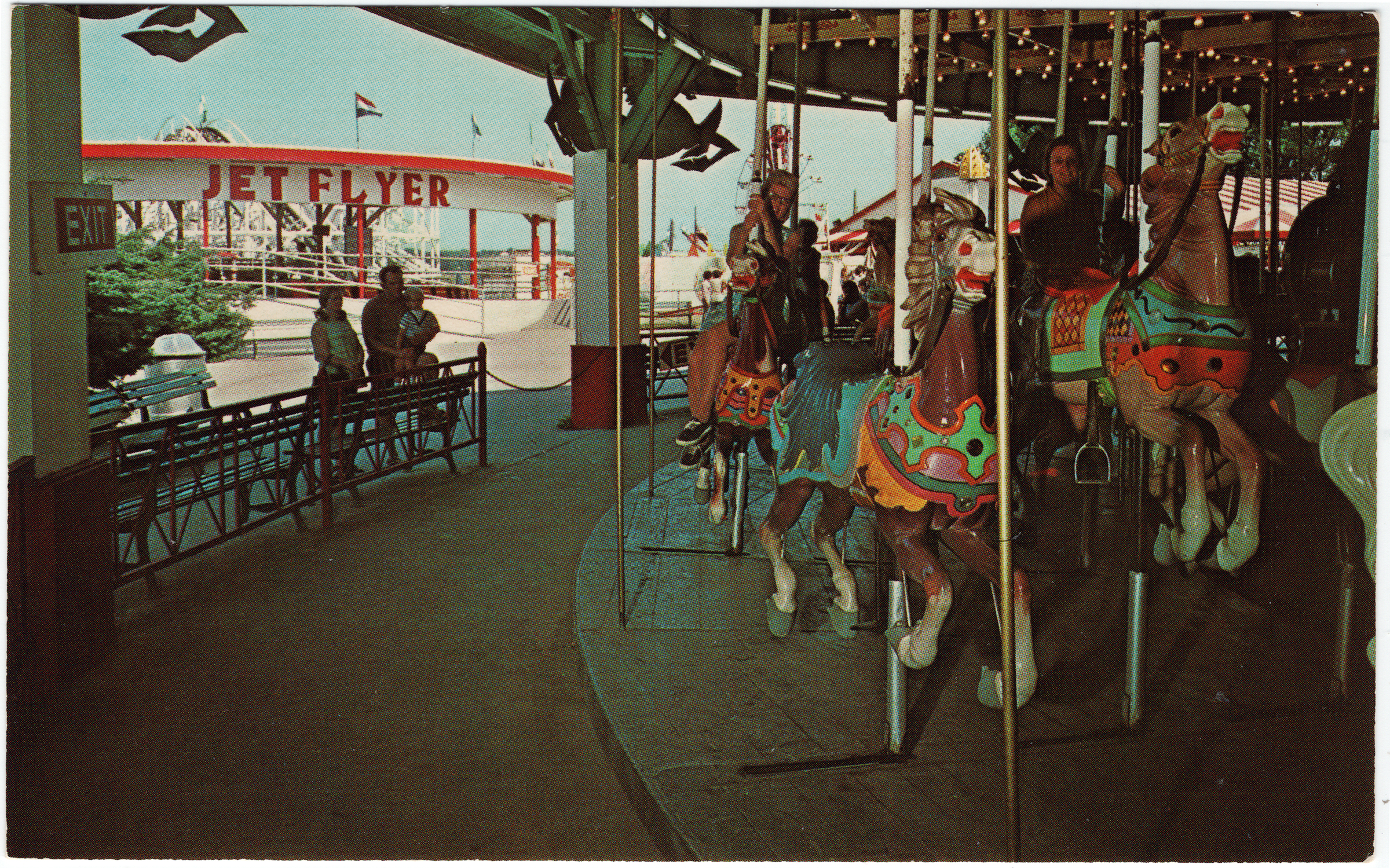
1970s postcard of the Grand Carousel and Jet Flyer at Zoo Park in Powell, Ohio. The Jet Flyer became the Sea Dragon when it became Wyandot Lake, the new park opening in 1984.

==== Zoombezi Bay ====
Name	Description	Height requirement	Manufacturer	Operated	Notes
Barracuda Bay	Water treehouse	A three-section pirate themed water treehouse.		1997–2013	Previously named Christopher's Island from 1997–2006; removed after the 2013 season to make way for Baboon Lagoon in 2014.
Croctail Island	Secluded, adults-only sun deck and bar. Surrounded by Croctail Creek.	Age: 21+ only		1991–2019	
Dolphin Dash	Six lane mat racer slide. Removed for a future attraction.	42"	ProSlide Technology	2008–2024	

==== Wyandot Lake ====
Name	Type	Description	Operating	Notes/fate
Barracuda (original)	Eyerly "Rock-O-Plane"	Ferris wheel with completely free spinning cages. Painted blue.	1989-1999	Replaced in 2000 with the Tilt-A-Whirl from Geauga Lake, but kept the same name and sign that the Rock-O-Plane used.
Barracuda (replacement)	Sellner Tilt-A-Whirl	This ride had seven free spinning cars that moved with unpredictable motion around a circular track. Had red, white, and blue theme.	2000–present	Moved to Jungle Jack's Landing, renamed "Whirligigs" and painted in a pond theme. It has since been removed and sold to Funtimes Fun Park, near Alliance, Ohio.
Black Squid	Eyerly "Spider"	This ride had six arms, with two cars attached at the end of each arm. The cars spun independently and each car had to be loaded separately by an employee. Had yellow and green fluorescent bulbs along with yellow incandescent bulbs under the downward-curving arms.	unknown-2006	Not operating often, as it was subject to frequent breakdowns and long wait times (because of loading).
Buccaneer Bay	Kiddie play area	This was a small kiddie play pool	1990-1997	This pool became home to the exit of "Shark Attack" when the bigger "Christopher's Island" was built in 1997.
Canoochee Creek	Lazy river	This lazy river had features such as a leaky tunnel, air bubbles, steam (coming from the scenery), a bar along the way called "Croctail Island", and a "mill".	1991-present	Still used today as "Crocktail Creek" in Zoombezi Bay. It is for adults only and still has Croctail Island. Also toned down, for a "lazier" effect. Some of the scenery was burned down in a fire, but replaced soon after.
Cod Cars	Allan Herschell "Midge-O-Racer"	A car ride where riders would go in a circle, but be able to change the position (radius) of their path by turning the steering wheel.	unknown-1999	Part of "Kiddie Land". Replaced by "Guppies".
Dune Buggies	Hampton "Combo"	Circular Hampton car ride with two sets of motorcycles; red, yellow, and blue spinning canopy.	unknown-2006	Part of "Kiddie Land".
Dune Cycles	Hampton "Dune Cycles"	A Hampton motorcycle ride with hills throughout; spinning red and white canopy.	unknown-2006	Part of "Kiddie Land".
Flying Elephants	Sartori "Elephant Ride"	A spinning ride where all the elephants rose to 6 ft (1.8 m) in the air and came down all at once.	2000–2006	Part of "Kiddie Land". Replaced "Jet Fighter". Similar to the current elephant ride in Rides At Adventure Cove, but not the same.
Frog Pool	Kiddie play area	Small circular pool with small slide where toddlers would slide through a frog's mouth, and a large red mushroom fountain. Originally named the "TadPool".	1988-2006	
Grand Carousel	Carousel	This Mangels-Illions carousel had 52 horses, 2 chariots, and a Wurlitzer 153 band organ.	1914–1999	Fully restored in 2000 and moved to the Columbus Zoo and Aquarium.
Guppies	Eyerly "Bulgy the Whale"	A small circular fish ride where colorful fish would go up-and down (similar to the motion of a merry-go-round).	unknown-2006	Part of "Kiddie-Land". Replaced the old circular car ride.
Bait & Bump/Havoc Harbor (original)	Duce bumper cars	These bumper cars were a classic one/two rider type style. The ride had an island-themed backdrop with a concrete center island.	1984-2001	The cars were destroyed in a fire, and replaced with gentler cars under the same name. Originally named "Bait-n-Bump", name changed to "Havoc Harbor" around 1994.
Havoc Harbor (replacement)	Bumper cars	These bumper cars were a one-rider tank type. Two hand controlled sticks were used to operate the car that had an inner tube-like bumper. Cars were in all different colors. Power was distributed through the floor, rather than the ceiling.	2002–present	These cars were the replacement to the cars that were destroyed in the fire. They now occupy Rides At Adventure Cove as "Condor Craze".
Hydro Racer	Water slide	A 303-foot long water coaster.	1987-1990s	
Hum-Dinghies	Allan Herschell "Wet Boat"	Old kiddie boat ride with real water and boats with bells attached.	unknown-2004	Part of "Kiddie Land". Replaced with Kiddie Stage and Seating.
Jet Fighter	Allan Herschell "Skyfighter"	A spinning ride where all the ships rose to 6 ft (1.8 m) in the air and came down all at once.	unknown-1999	Part of "Kiddie-Land". Replaced with "Flying Elephants".
Jet Stream	Waterslide	Two fast black covered water slides, with small holes of light throughout.	unknown-2006	Started from same tower as the "Zuma Falls". Auctioned off to The Beach when Wyandot Lake closed.
Monsoon	King Amusements "Frolic"	Circular ride with carts seating two people (facing each other) that could be manually spun by a wheel in the center of the car. Painted blue with white and yellow fluorescent bulbs at top.	unknown-2006	
Neptune's Revenge	Eli Bridge "Scrambler"	This ride had three arms with three cars on each prong that spun as the ride goes around. Was painted white with a future-theme.	1986-present	Moved to Rides At Adventure Cove, renamed "Dust Devil" and painted brown.
Phantom Tunnel Hydro Tube Slide	Water tube slide	A 300-foot long enclosed tube slide.	1988-unknown	
Sand Dollar	Miniature Ferris wheel	Miniature Eli Bridge chain-driven Ferris wheel.	unknown-1997	Part of "Kiddie-Land". Almost always broken down; not replaced.
Sea Dragon	Figure-Eight junior coaster	This ride was built by the Philadelphia Toboggan Company and has been in operation ever since.	1956–present	Originally named "Jet Flyer". While now part of Rides At Adventure Cove, the coaster has remained in the same location. It also kept the same name and sign (on the station) but received a fresh coat of white paint.
Seahorses	Allan Herschell "Rodeo"	This horse-themed ride was similar to a little carousel, without music.	unknown-2006	Part of "Kiddie Land". Possibly made by the same manufacturer as the old circular car ride.
Shark Attack	Waterslide	This red slide held up to three people and let sliders go up onto the side of the slides through centripetal force while turning.	1997–2006	Occupied former home of "Buccaneer Bay". The Shark Attack ride was moved to Sam's Surf City in Pensacola, Florida.
Splash Slides	Body slides	Three body slides (one straight down, one curvy, and one completely covered). The two open slides were light blue, while the covered slide was a greenish color. These slides could be seen well from the parking lot.	unknown-2006	Name changed frequently with different sponsors, such as "Ice Mountain Splash" and "Sunkist Splash". The covered slide, named "The Phantom", was hardly ever open and eventually was permanently closed around 2003.
Starfish	Ferris wheel	A 16-seat Eli Bridge chain driven "Aristocrat" Ferris wheel.	1984-2006	
Tottering Turtles	Chambers "Kid Turtle"	A circular ride with a hill in one point. Almost like a roller coaster, but very small and electric powered throughout the ride (no chained hill).	2000–2006	Part of "Kiddie Land". Replaced the space-ship ride.
Twin Skippers	Water coaster	A double water toboggan slide.	1984-unknown	
Uncle Al's Treehouse	Kiddie play area	A dry play area sponsored by Rax Restaurants, containing a hammock net, 16-foot-long tubular slide, tire wells, rope tunnel, and log bridge.	1987-unknown	
Wild Rage	Water slide	A 247-foot long free-fall slide descending at a 53-degree angle.	1987-1990s	
Wild Tide	Wave pool	Large wave pool	1984-2006	The current wave pool in Zoombezi Bay has a similar name, but is otherwise completely different.
Wyandot Falls	Water slides	Three water slides, each 45 feet high and 400 feet in length.	1984-unknown	
Zuma Falls	Waterslide	Two gentle generic white-water slides. Riders rode tubes down this open slide.	1994–2006	Started from same tower as the "Jet Stream". Auctioned off to The Beach when Wyandot Lake closed.
(?)	Flying ships	Four (or two?) metal spaceships hanging from an overhead canopy.	unknown-1999	Part of "Kiddie Land".

== Theme song ==
The Zoombezi Bay theme song "Zoombezi Bay" was written and produced by freelance musician Kelly Warner from Columbus, Ohio. Vocals were performed by Nachilus Kezuck and Brian O'Dell.
