= Columbus Zoo and Aquarium =

Zoo and aquarium in Ohio, United States

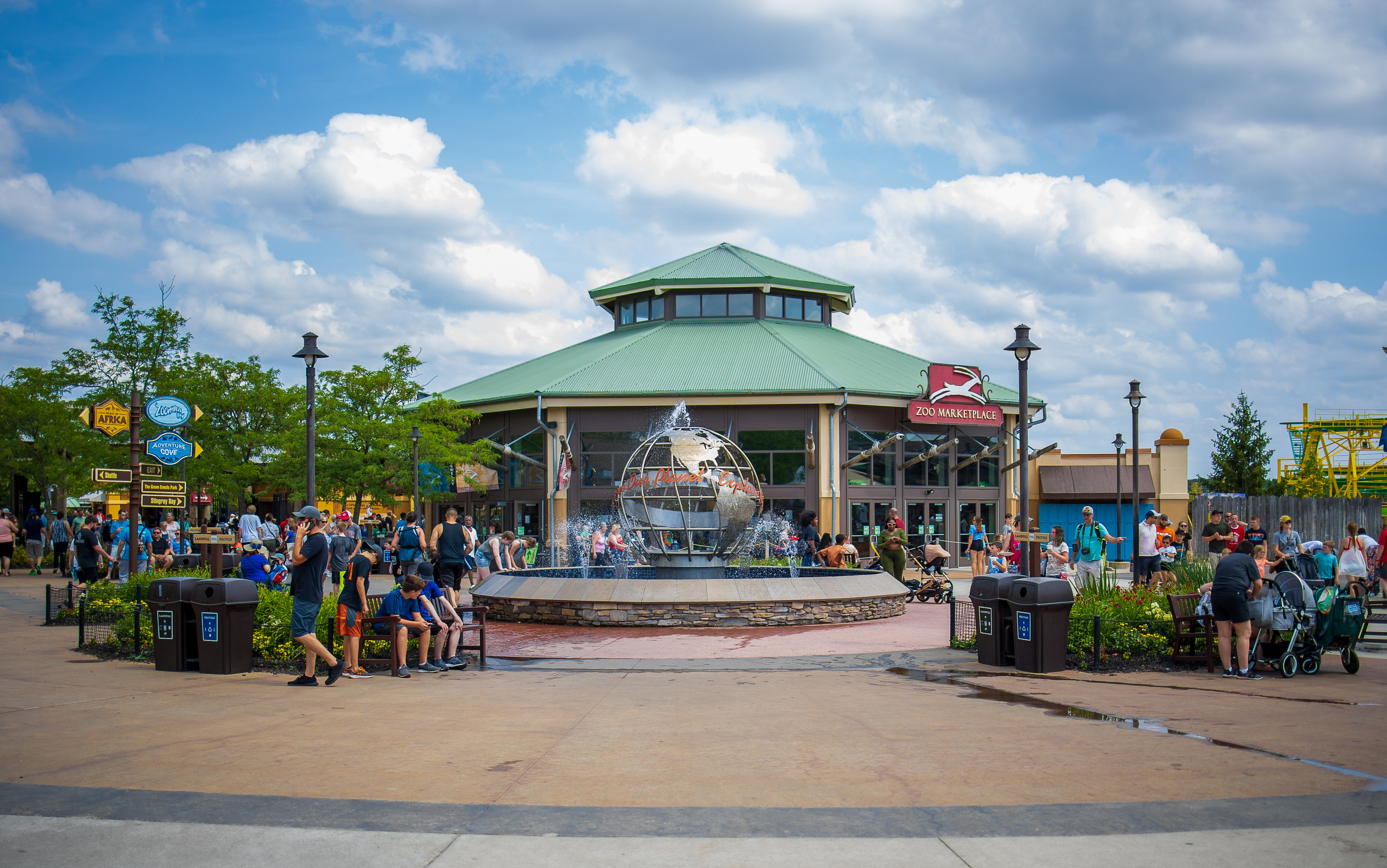
- Central plaza and Celebration of Giving Fountain
- Interactive map of Columbus Zoo and Aquarium
- 40.156266°N 83.118403°W
- Date opened: 1927; 99 years ago
- Location: Powell, Ohio, United States
- Land area: 234 ha (580 acres)
- No. of animals: More than 10,000
- No. of species: Over 800
- Annual visitors: 2+ million
- Memberships: AZA, WAZA, ZAA
- Major exhibits: North America Trek, Heart of Africa, Asia Quest, Shores & Aquarium, Polar Frontier, Australia and the Islands, Adventure Cove and Congo Expedition
- Public transit: Zoo Bus
- Website: www.columbuszoo.org

The Columbus Zoo and Aquarium is a non-profit zoo located near Powell in Liberty Township, Delaware County, Ohio, United States, north of the city of Columbus. The land lies along the eastern banks of the O'Shaughnessy Reservoir on the Scioto River, at the intersection of Riverside Drive and Powell Road. It has a worldwide reputation, largely attributable to the efforts and promotion of director emeritus Jack Hanna. In 2009, it was named by the USA Travel Guide as the number one zoo in the United States. It was also ranked number one best zoo in 2012 by Besties Readers Choice.

The Columbus Zoo is home to more than 7,000 animals representing over 800 species and sees over 2 million visitors annually. The animal exhibits are divided into regions of the world, with the zoo currently operating eight such regions. In addition the zoo owns an 18-hole golf course, known as the Safari Golf Club which encompasses 56.656 hectares (140 acres). The zoo also owns Zoombezi Bay which encompasses 9.187 hectares (22.70 acres). In total, the zoo owns 234 hectares (580 acres) of land, with 164.424 hectares (406.30 acres) dedicated to the zoo itself.

The zoo operates its own conservation program, donating money to outside programs as well as participating in their own conservation efforts. Over the past five years the zoo has contributed over $3.3 million to more than 70 projects in 30 countries. The zoo also has a close working relationship with the Wilds, a 9,154-acre (37.04 km^{2}) animal conservation center located in southeast Ohio and featured on the Columbus Zoo's website.

Columbus Zoo and Aquarium, and by extension The Wilds, are prominently featured in the Nat Geo Wild series Secrets of the Zoo, a series focusing on various activities done with the animals in the zoo.

== History ==
=== Early history ===
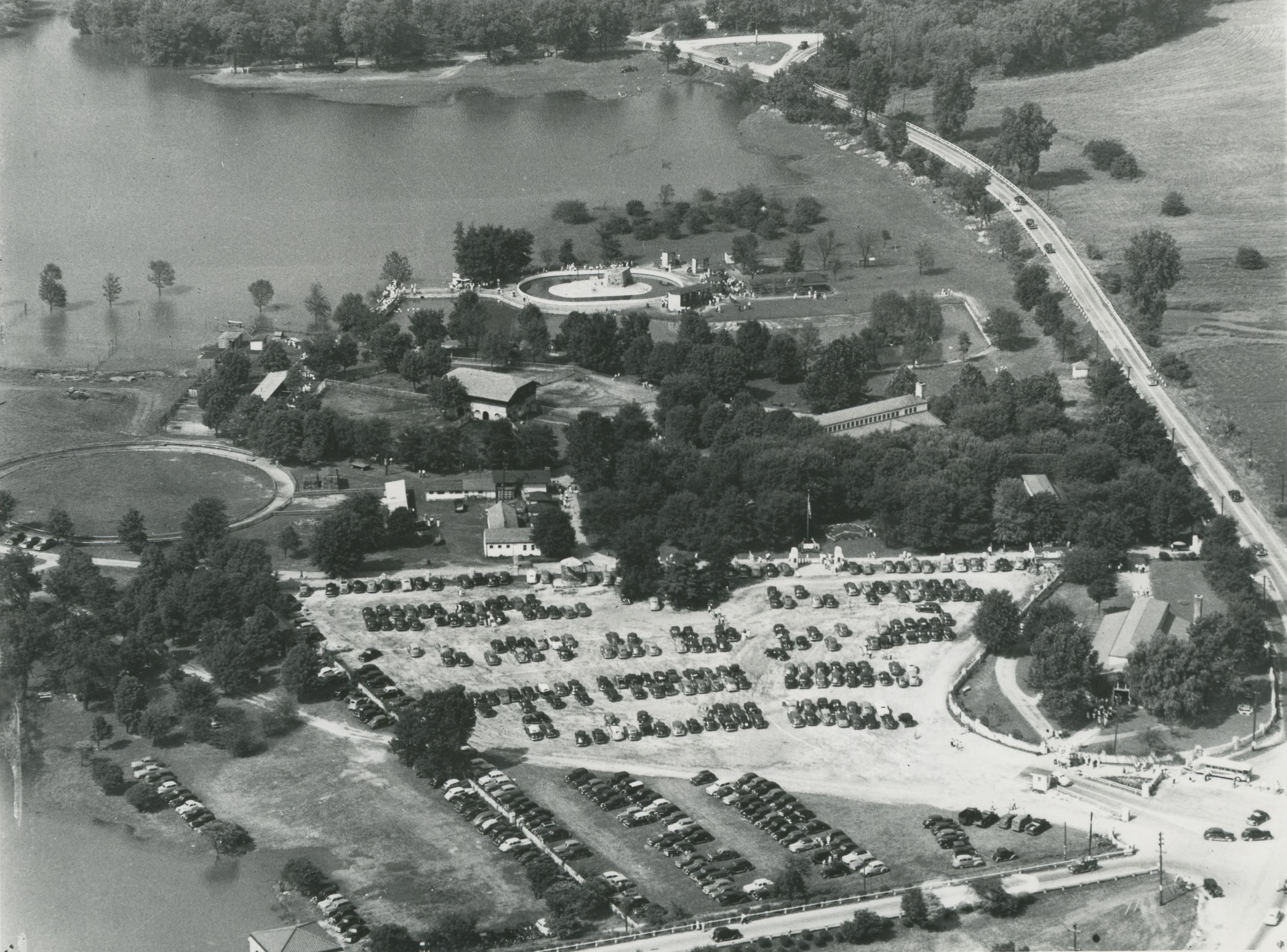
Columbus Zoo aerial photograph, c. 1940

The first zoo in Columbus, known as "the Zoo" was operated by the Columbus Zoological Company (not affiliated with today's Columbus Zoo). It was located in the present-day Old Beechwold Historic District in Clintonville. The zoo opened in May 1905 but closed for unknown reasons only five months later in October. The former monkey house can still be seen on the property of 150 West Beechwold Boulevard where it is used as a barn. The zoo's original brick entrance can also be seen on North High Street at Beechwold Road.

The present Columbus Zoo opened in 1927 as Riverside Park on 21 acres (8.5 ha) by the O'Shaughnessy Reservoir. The zoo was initially conceived by Harry P. Wolfe, owner of the Columbus Dispatch, and the Columbus Mayor on a trip to the St. Louis in 1920 where they visited the zoo. Wolfe began purchasing exotic animals for the zoo and kept them in the Franklin Park Conservatory until the park was ready. Its first building housed lions and tigers and was completed in 1932.

In 1937, the zoo's name changed to the Columbus Municipal Zoo and utilized membership fees to fund its growth, but by 1950 was struggling financially.

=== 1950 to present ===
The city of Columbus took over management of the zoo in 1951 but later gave up ownership to the Zoological Park Association, Inc., a non-profit organization, in 1970. The city continued providing funds from the city's general fund, however, until 1986.

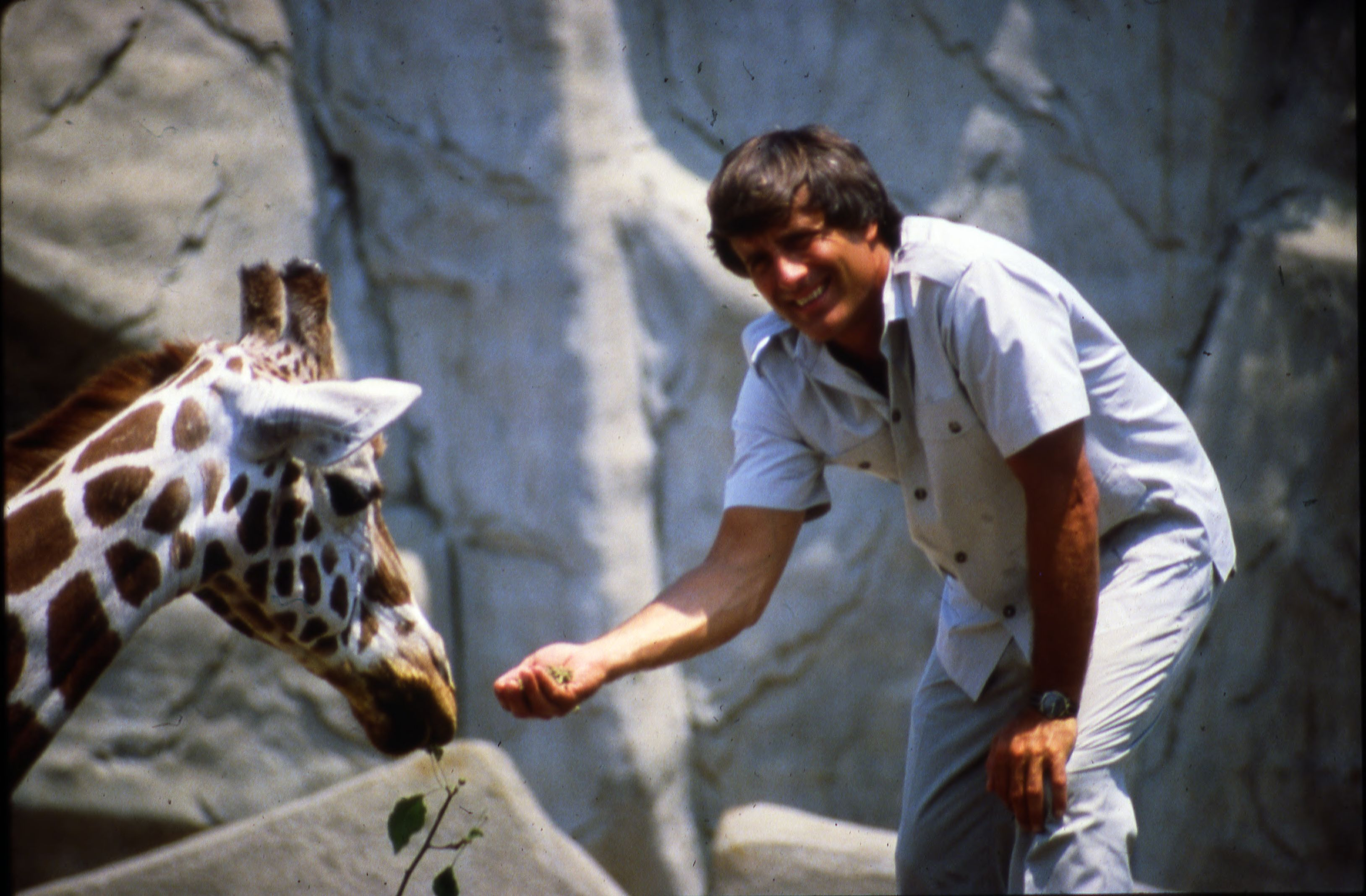
Zoo director Jack Hanna offers food to a giraffe, c. 1992

Jack Hanna became the director of the Columbus Zoo in 1978 and remained director until 1993. From 2008 to 2010, Siu-Leung Lee was the zoo's director. The zoo benefited greatly from his oversight, rising to national recognition during his tenure. Prior to his arrival, the zoo saw an average annual attendance of about 360,000. In addition, the animal facilities were in need of renovation. Hanna put an extensive amount of effort into turning the Columbus Zoo into a model facility, including personally picking up trash after hours. Cage enclosures were also removed during his time and replaced with more natural looking habitats. His enthusiasm, along with his national television recognition, helped attract more visitors to the zoo, with over 1.4 million visitors annually by 1992. Hanna was named director emeritus of the zoo in 1993 and continued to be the public face for the zoo in its marketing campaigns until 2020.

In 2004, voters passed a measure that would raise an estimated $180 million to expand the zoo over 10 years. The 120-acre (0.5 km^{2}) expansion includes additional parking, Polar Frontier, an exhibit including polar bears and Arctic foxes as well as Heart of Africa, the most recent exhibit, which includes lions, antelope, cheetahs, giraffe, zebras, etc. To make room for these new exhibits, bordering Powell Road has been relocated around the eastern and southern border of the zoo. A new entrance was constructed along the new roadway, which opened in early 2008. Long-term plans include the possibility of a resort-style hotel to attract tourists along with its outdoor water-amusement park, Zoombezi Bay.

On June 28, 2009, Jeff Swanagan, the executive director of the zoo, died suddenly at the age of 51. Dale Schmidt, the zoo's chief operating officer, was named executive director on November 20, 2009.

==== Loss and restoration of accreditation ====
In 2021, zoo executives were reported by The Columbus Dispatch as having inappropriate businesses practices that used zoo resources for personal use. Zoo officials addressed the allegations, admitting to mistakes and cut ties to institutions involved but did not clarify specific issues. On October 7, 2021, the Columbus Zoo was to lose its Association of Zoos and Aquariums accredited status for financial mismanagement and animal endangerment. The zoo appealed the decision, and kept its accreditation provisionally. In December 2021, this appeal was denied, with an option to reapply in autumn 2022.

Also in December, Tom Schmid became the president and CEO of the Columbus Zoo. Schmid came to Columbus from the Texas State Aquarium in Corpus Christi, Texas, and planned to improve the zoo's image and restore its accreditation.

The zoo regained AZA accreditation in March 2023. It is also accredited by the Zoological Association of America.

== Exhibits ==
The Columbus Zoo is divided into eight regions, each housing animals from a particular region of the world. Each region is themed for the particular area of the world they are representing, though older regions are themed less than the newly constructed ones. Food and souvenir shops are located throughout the zoo, each one also themed for the region the shop is in.

There are three modes of transportation through the zoo other than walking. These include a train that circles the North America Trek, a tram that borders the southern part of the North America Trek that takes visitors to Polar Frontier, and a boat ride around the Islands of Southeast Asia region.

=== Adventure Cove ===
"Adventure Cove" opened in July 2020. This region contains a pool for California sea lions and harbor seals, Jack Hanna's Animal Encounter Village, which houses a rotating cast of around twenty of the Zoo's ambassador animal species, and the Stingray Bay, which predates the rest of the region, having opened in June 2012.

=== North America Trek ===
The "North America Trek" (formerly known as simply 'North America') is the second-largest and the oldest region, which opened in Spring of 1985. In total, the North America Trek covers roughly 14 acres (57,000 m^{2}) of land and contains a number of large exhibits, including a 10,000 sq ft (930 m^{2}) migratory songbird aviary containing over 20 species. In addition to the exhibits, the North America Trek contains the train ride that circles the region. The first phase of the region went through extensive construction for a renovation, and reopened in June 2025.

=== Polar Frontier ===
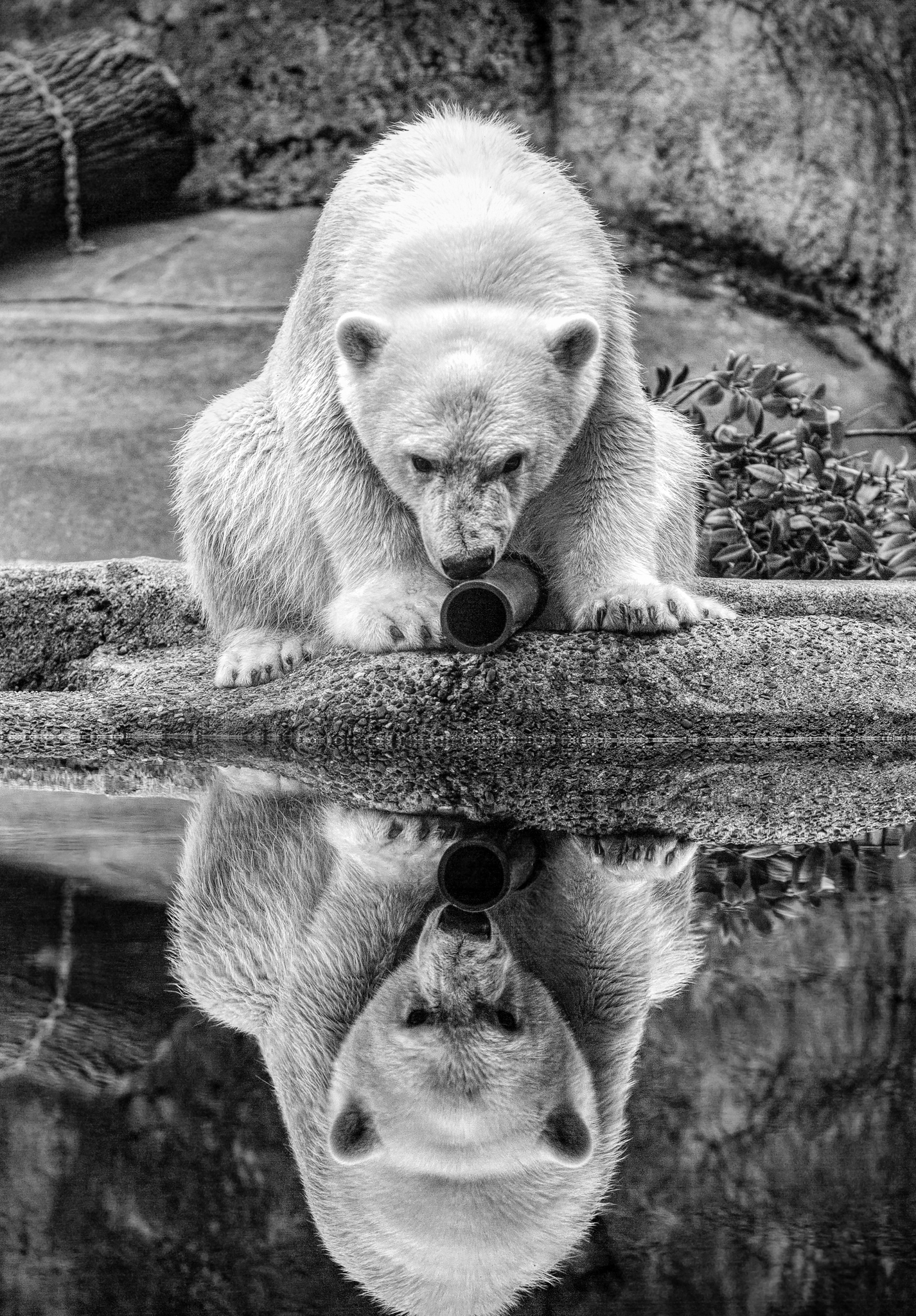
Polar bear Nora

The "Polar Frontier" opened in May 2010, featuring animals native to colder climates including Arctic foxes and brown bears. The region also marked the return of polar bears to the zoo, whose habitat includes a 167,000 US gallons (630,000 L) pool and an underwater viewing area. The center of the exhibit includes a Conservation/Education Building and a new play area. The zoo added a third polar bear in 2013 and further expanded Polar Frontier in 2014.

In 2015, one of the bears in the Polar Frontier, Aurora, gave birth to a bear cub, which the zoo named Nora. Nora, born on November 6, 2015, was the first polar bear born and raised at the zoo since the opening of Polar Frontier. She now resides at the Hogle Zoo in Utah.

=== Heart of Africa ===
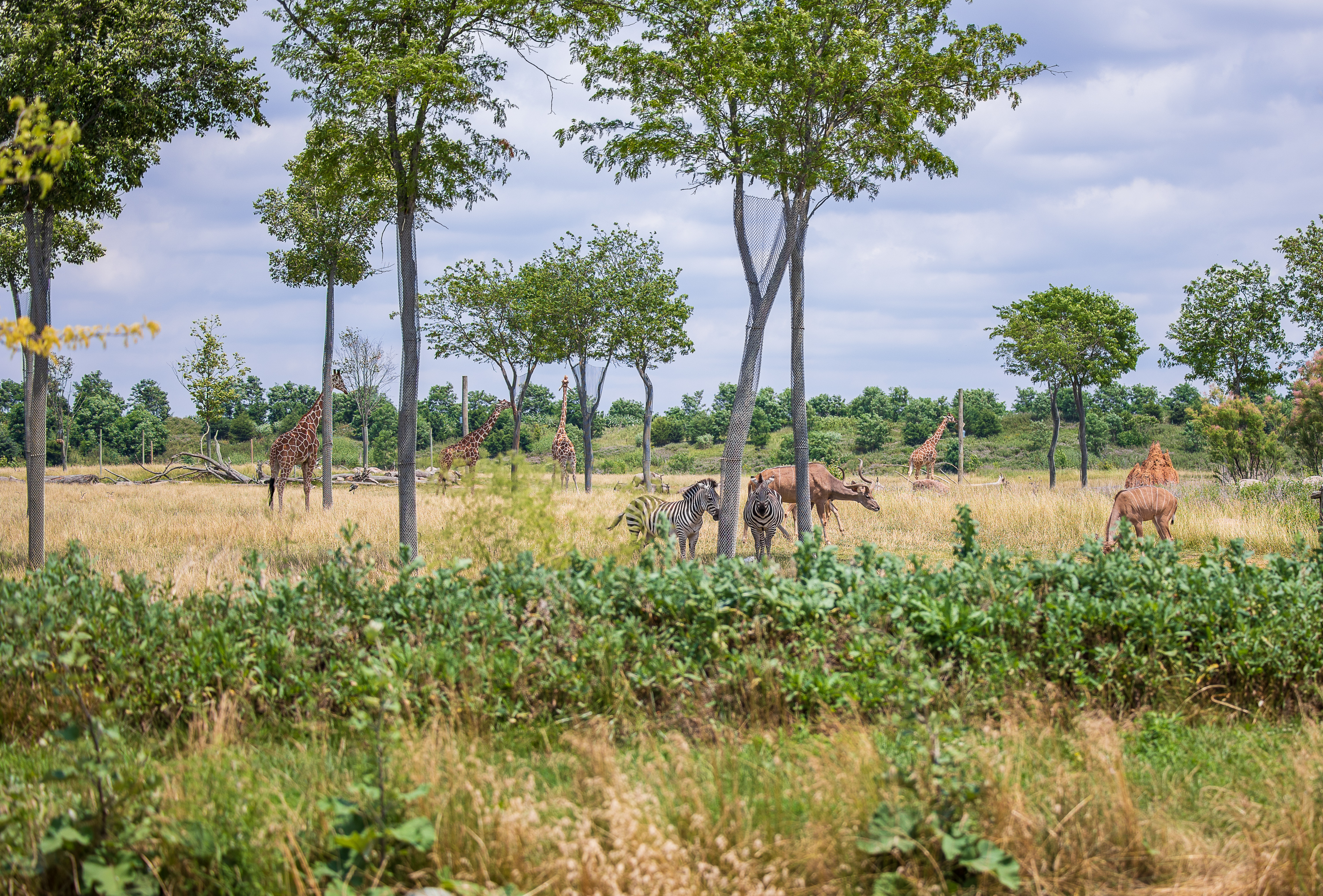
Heart of Africa region

The "Heart of Africa" region opened in May 2014 and is located to the north and east of the zoo . The area encompasses 43 acres (170,000 m^{2}) of land, and feature many African plains animals. One exhibit in the new region are lions, which were moved in order to accommodate Asia Quest, as well as giraffes, cheetahs, zebras, and vervet monkeys. Following the design of recent exhibits such as the Islands of Southeast Asia, the African savanna attempts to merge habitats and scenery to make visitors feel as if they are on the plains. Other features including giraffe feedings, as well as dining facilities.

The centerpiece of the Heart of Africa exhibit is the Watering Hole, an open rotational enclosure containing a large pond. The exhibit is designed to accommodate many different species, and different animals rotate in and out throughout the day. Some of the zoo's species can only be viewed at the Watering Hole.

=== Asia Quest ===
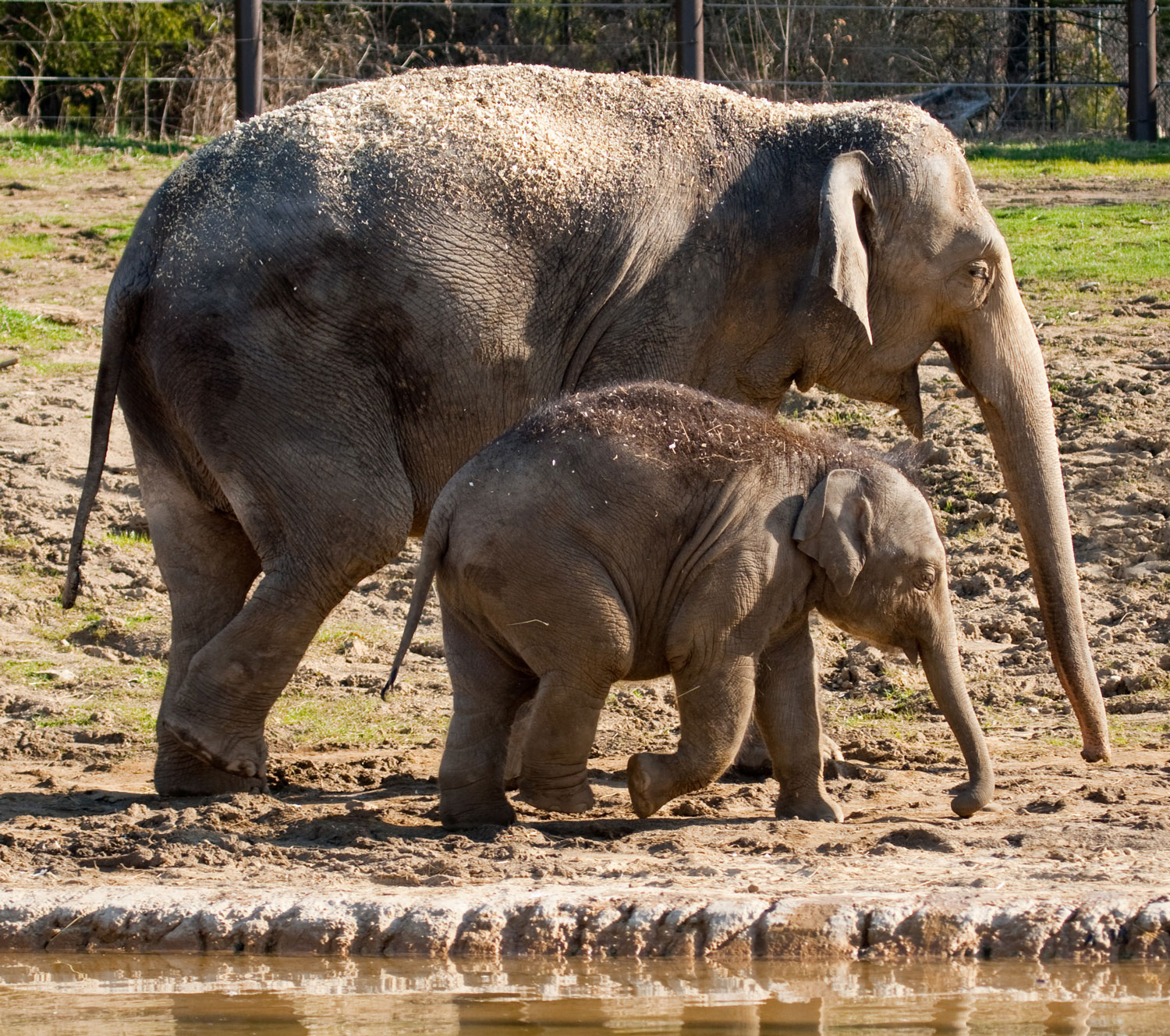
Elephants strolling through the zoo

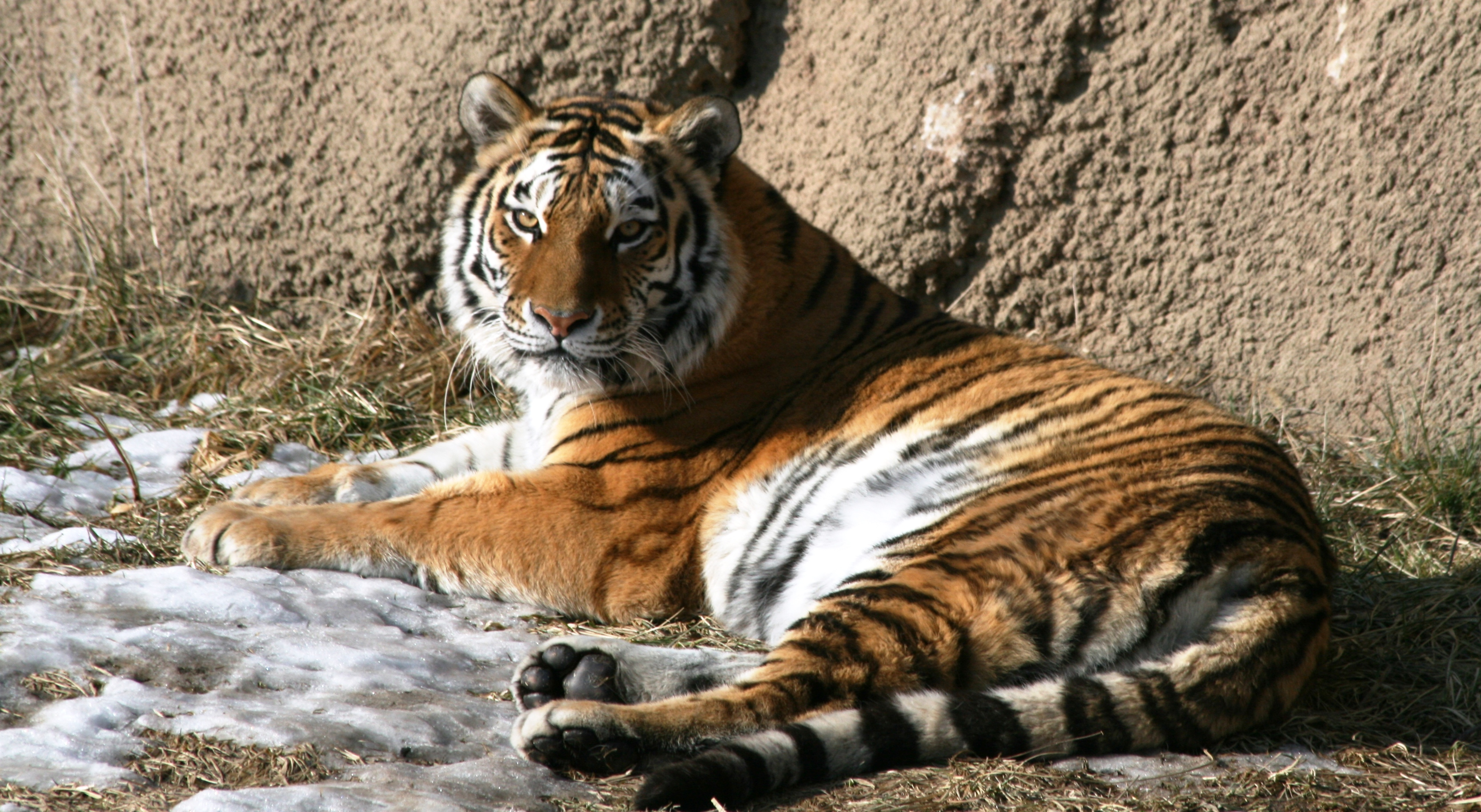
Tiger at the zoo

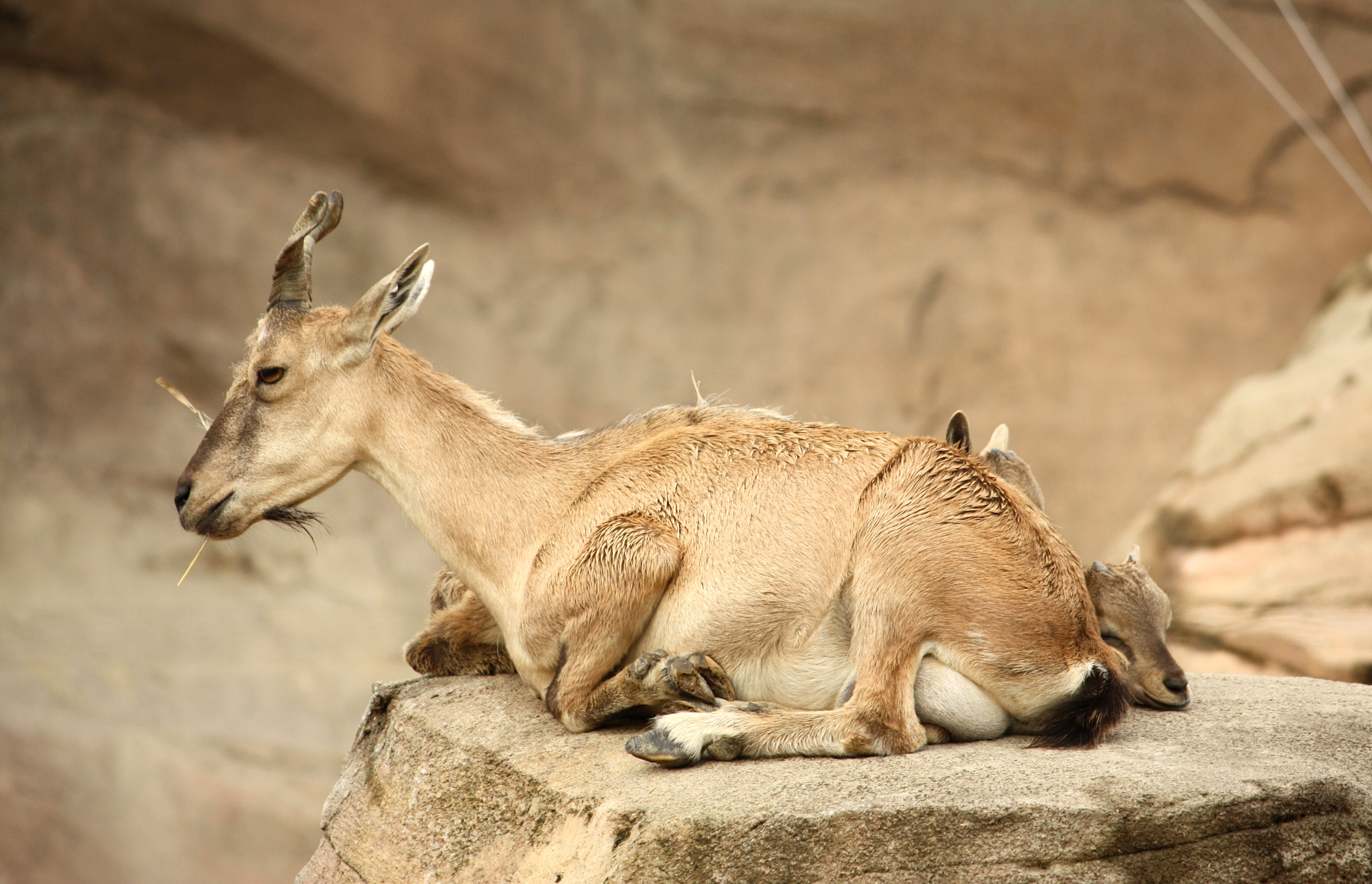
A female Markhor with a young. Markhor is the national animal of Pakistan and is considered an endangered species by IUCN.

The Asia themed region, "Asia Quest" opened in two phases in 2006. The region is an attempt to more fully immerse visitors into the exhibits, not only building larger and more attractive exhibits, but also melding them together with the scenery. Visitors entering Asia Quest pass a waterfall flanked by two habitats, travel through a cave containing the indoor habitats, exit into a Chinese forest, and finally enter an Asia Quest aviary designed to look like an abandoned Asian garden. Instead of fences, habitats are either recessed and separated via rock walls, or on ground level and separated by the rock walls and glass. Asia Quest also promotes donations for animal conservation, as many of the region's animals are threatened in the wild.

=== Shores & Aquarium ===
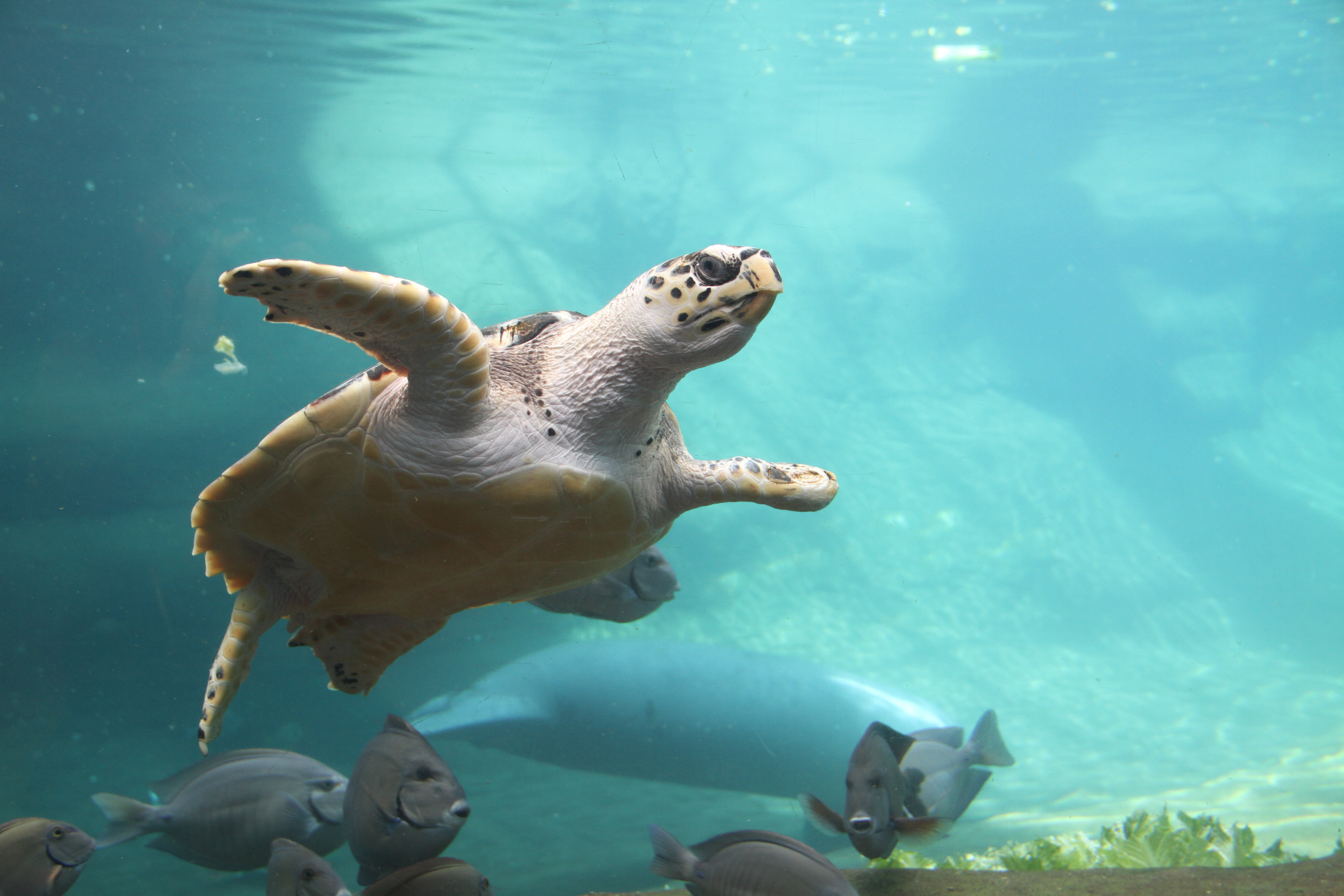
Buddy the turtle in Manatee Coast indoor habitat

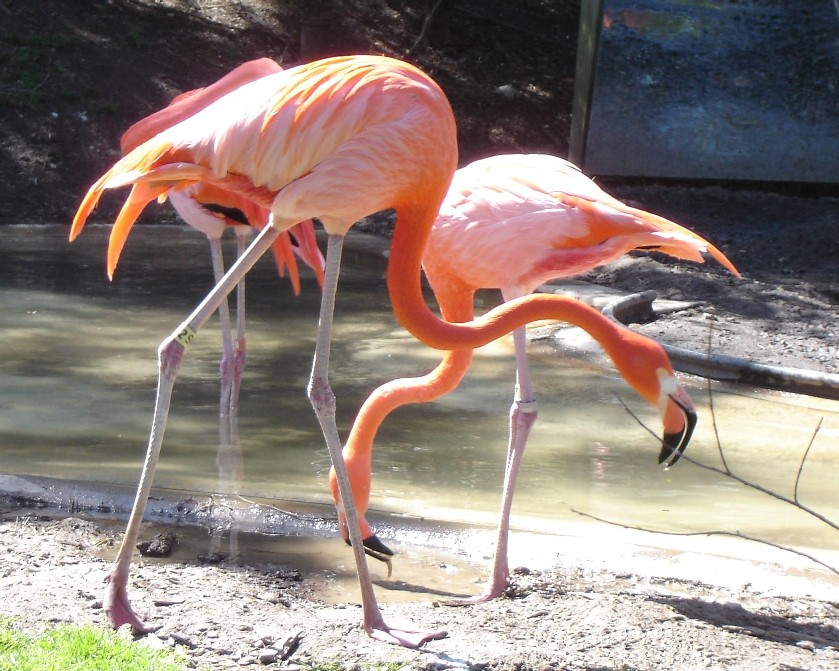
Two flamingos drinking in their habitat

The "Shores and Aquarium" region is most well known for the fish and manatee aquariums, known as "Discovery Reef" and "Manatee Rescue and Rehabilitation Center". In addition to the indoor aquariums, the shores region also features exhibits of Caribbean flamingos, American alligators, Humboldt penguins, and Aldabra giant tortoises.

Discovery Reef, which opened in 1993, is an 88,000-US-gallon (330,000 L) saltwater aquarium and houses numerous species of fish, seahorses, sharks, and garden eels. It also houses a live coral exhibit, one of the largest in the United States although the coral in the largest tank is synthetic.

Manatee Rescue and Rehabilitation Center (formerly the 'Manatee Coast'), which opened in 1999, is the cornerstone of the region, supporting the endangered Florida manatees, fish, stingrays, a sea turtle, and pelicans in a 192,000-US-gallon (730,000 L) indoor habitat. This habitat is one of only two outside of Florida to keep manatees, making it an especially popular exhibit. The building is also covered by a retractable roof, which creates an outdoor environment for up to five manatees during warm weather.

The Reptile Habitat is the first building encountered heading west after exiting the tunnel under Riverside Drive and is located within the shores region. Originally opened in 1968, it is a fully indoor facility, containing numerous snakes, terrapins, lizards, and tortoises. The Columbus Zoo has also bred many threatened reptile species.

=== Australia and the Islands ===
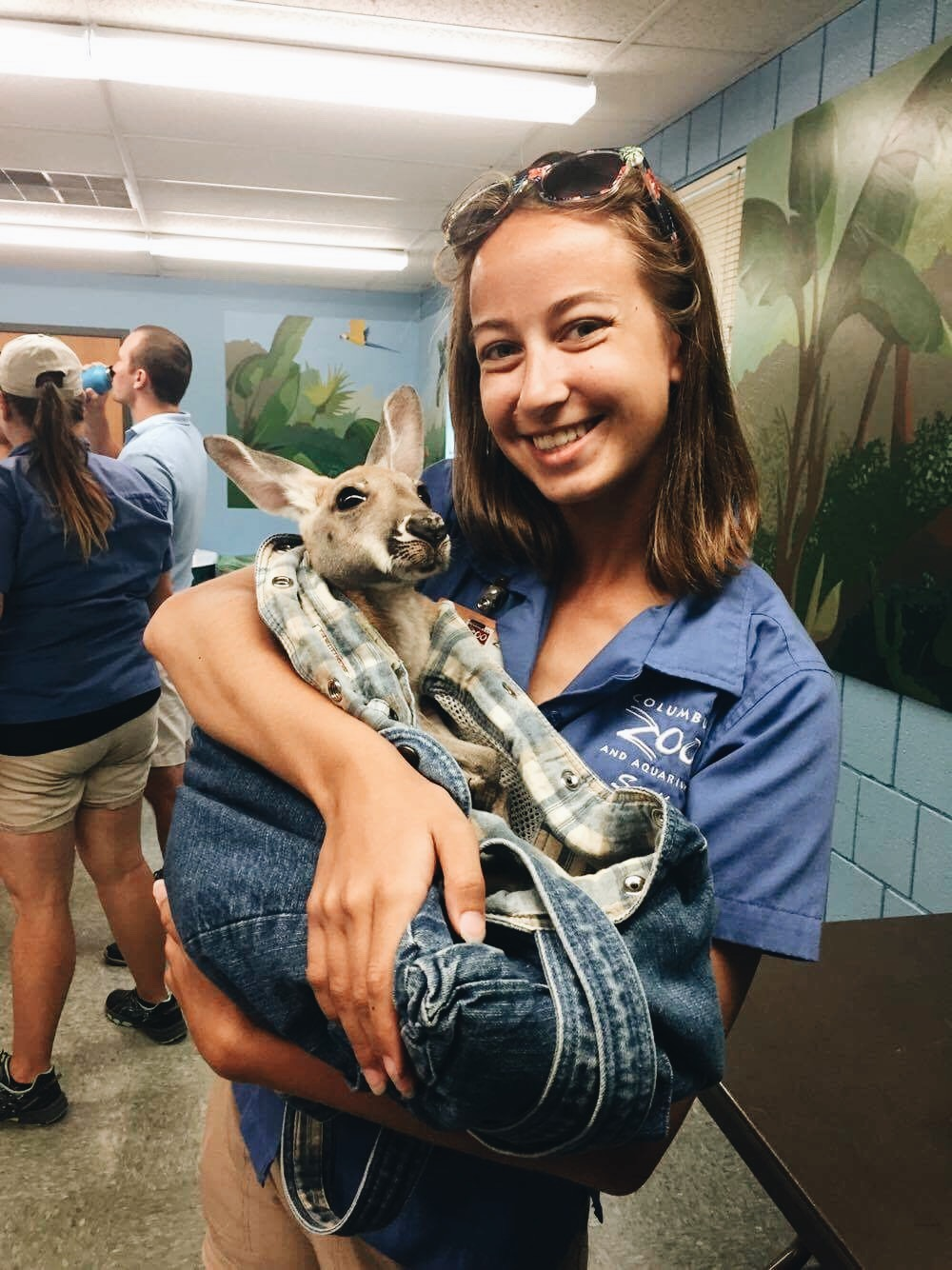
Kangaroo with staff member during a Summer Experience Camp

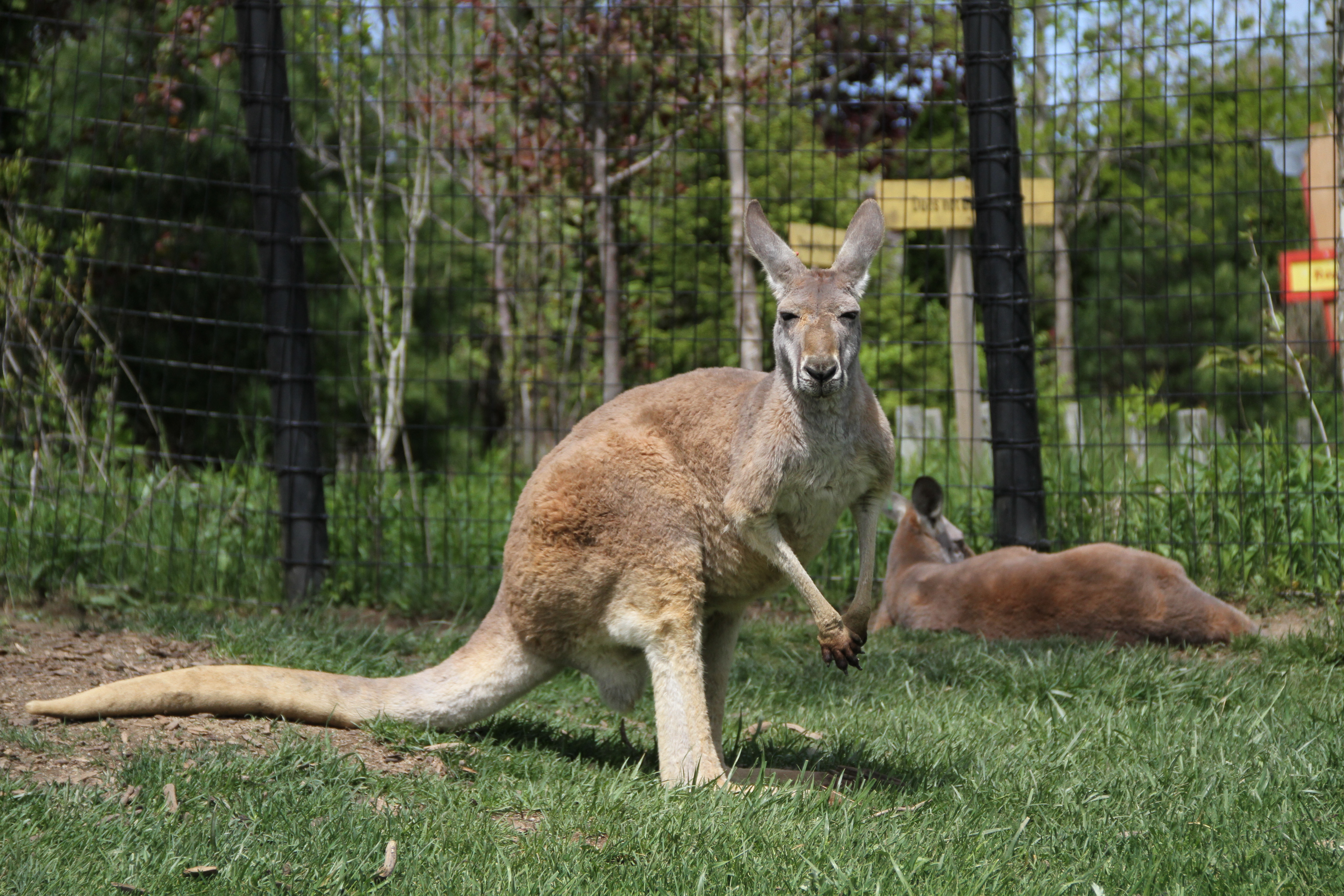
Red kangaroo in the Walkabout Exhibit

The Australia region is located on the far west side of the zoo, lying along the east bank of the Scioto River. The nocturnal exhibit opened in November 2003, while the kangaroo walkabout, koala habitat, and Lorikeet Aviary opened in 2004. The Nocturnal Building (formerly the 'Roadhouse') is an indoor nocturnal exhibit displaying animals from Southeast Asia, Australia, and New Zealand, including Indian crested porcupine, North Island brown kiwi, southern hairy-nosed wombat, and an indoor flight aviary displaying over twenty species of Asian and Australian birds. The region's feature habitat is the kangaroo walkabout exhibit, which houses red kangaroos and eastern grey kangaroos. The habitat is at ground-level, which allows visitors to walk through the actual habitat along with the kangaroos. The Columbus Zoo is one of only nine US zoos to permanently house koalas and is one of the few US zoos to display the species in both outdoor and indoor habitats. The exhibit in the region is Lorikeet Aviary featuring rainbow lorikeets, coconut lorikeets, and marigold lorikeets. The exhibit allows visitors to purchase a cup of nectar and feed the birds. In 2019, the Tasmanian devil exhibit opened, featuring the Tasmanian devils.

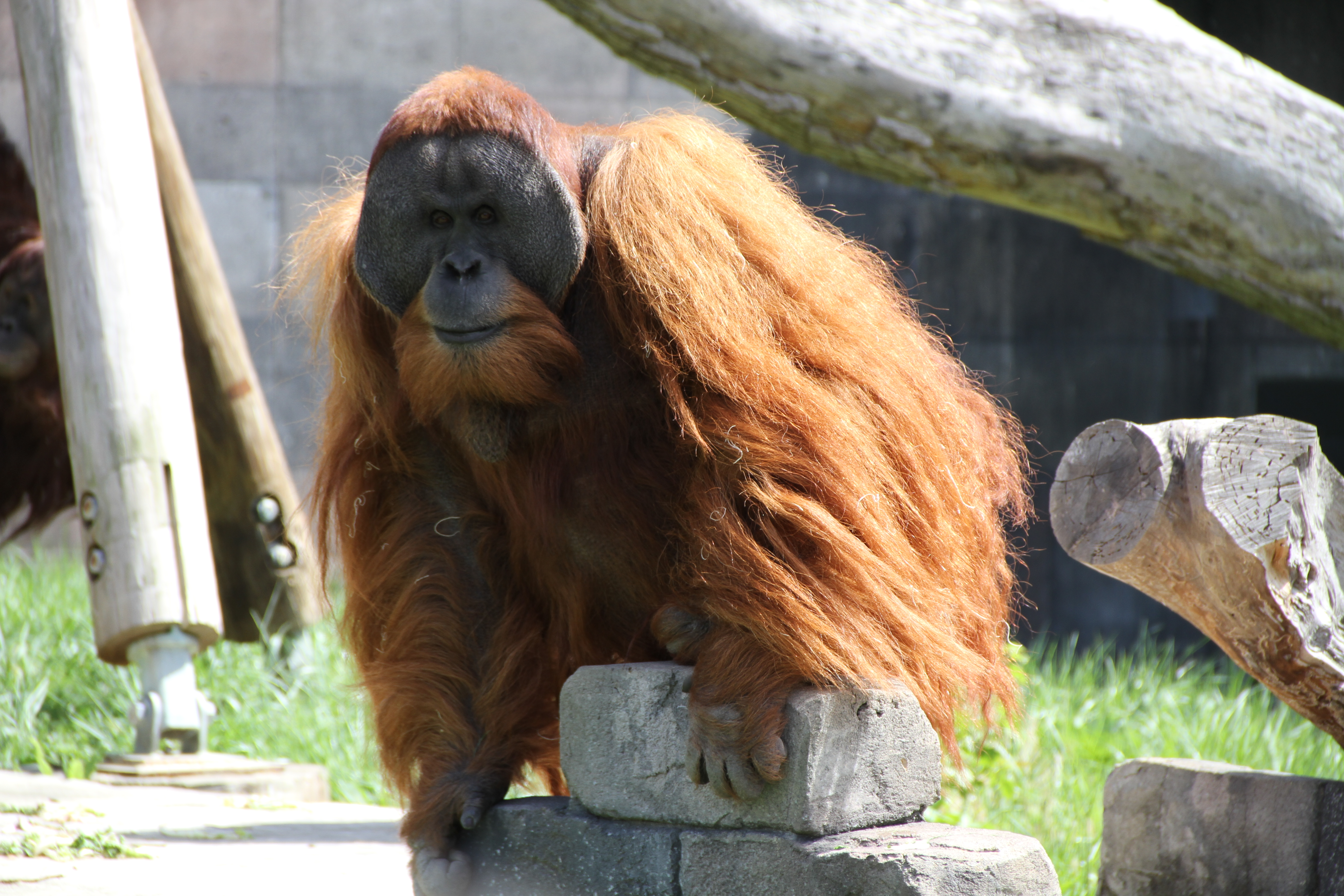
Orangutan at the exhibit

The Islands of Southeast Asia region opened in 2003. Similarly to Asia Quest, Islands of Southeast Asia attempts to be more immersive, melding the exhibits and scenery to create the feeling that the visitor is walking through one continuous exhibit. This is done mostly with man-made scenery and vegetation. Included in the man-made scenery is a waterway that flows around the region and carries the boat ride from which visitors can view the region's exhibits.

=== Congo Expedition ===
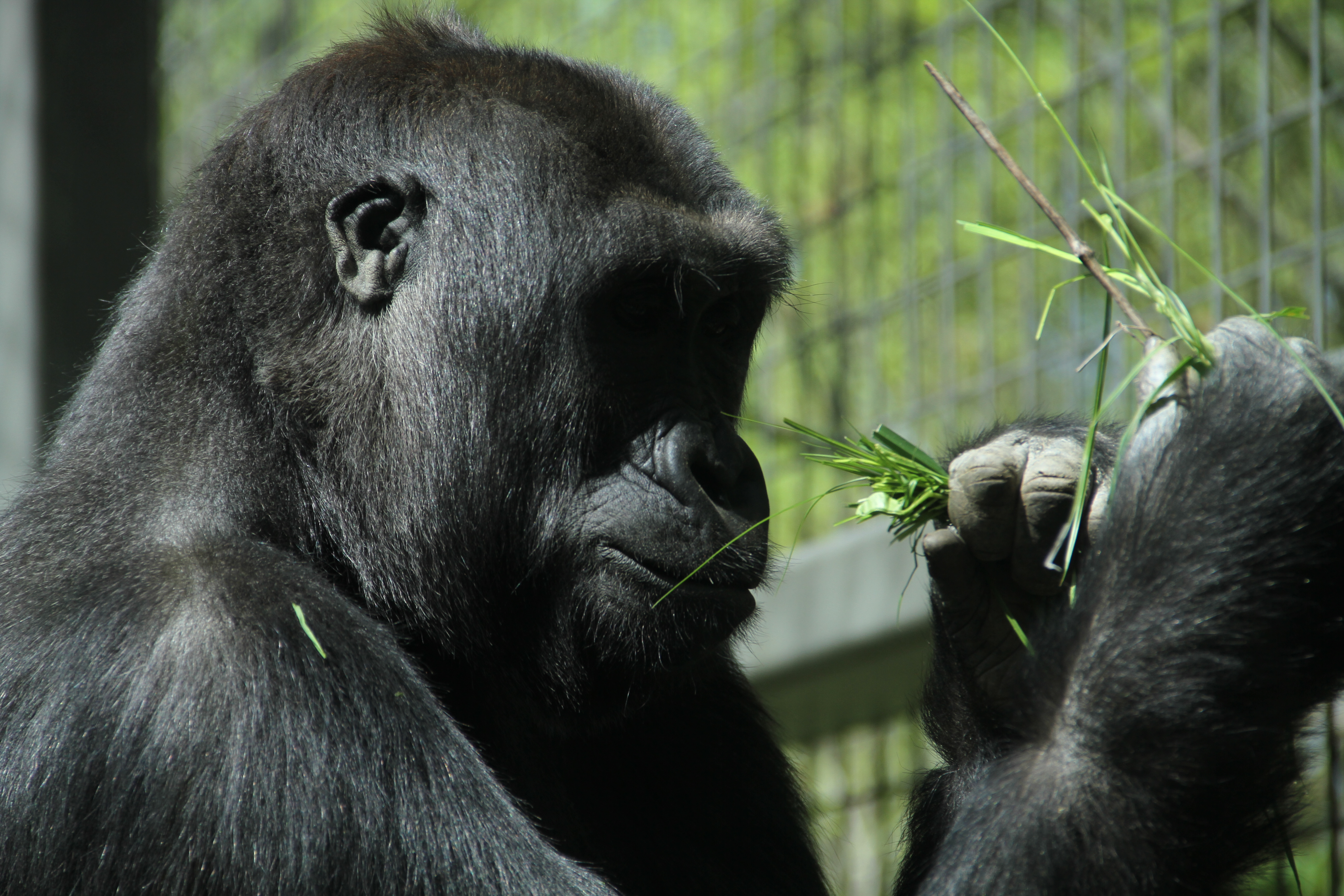
A female western lowland gorilla

The African forest region, "Congo Expedition", opened in 2000 and showcases animals from the Central African rainforest, which includes numerous primates, hooved mammals, large cats, and many birds housed in an aviary. The highlight of the region is the primate area featuring three generations of western lowland gorillas, the progeny of Colo, the first gorilla to be born in captivity in the world.

The Columbus Zoo has a rapidly expanding group of bonobos. Bonobos are the closest living relative to humans and are only found at eight U.S. zoos and less than 20 worldwide zoos outside their native Democratic Republic of the Congo, where they are endangered.

On May 18, 2012, one of the zoo's gorillas, Mumbah, died of heart failure at the age of 47. Mumbah had been part of the Columbus Zoo since 1984, when he was acquired from an animal park in England.

A leopard at the zoo

== Notable animals ==
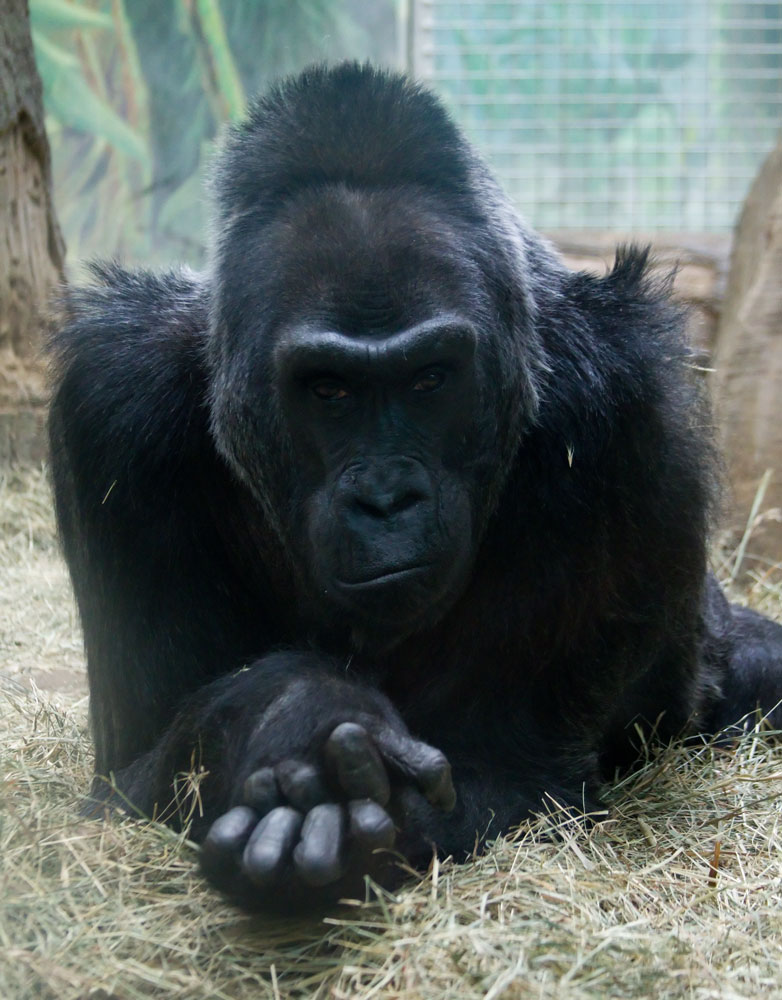
Colo (1956–2017) was the first gorilla born in captivity and lived to be the oldest gorilla in captivity.

On December 22, 1956, Colo, a western lowland gorilla, became the world's first captive-born gorilla at the Columbus Zoo. When she died in January 2017, at the age of 60, she was the oldest gorilla in human care. Colo's extended family includes one child, ten grandchildren, four great-grandchildren, and two great-great-grandchildren living in zoos throughout the country. The Columbus Zoo currently houses fifteen gorillas, six of which are related to Colo. The Columbus Zoo has a gorilla breeding program, with 31 gorillas born at the zoo since 1956. Colo was named after Columbus, the city of her birth.

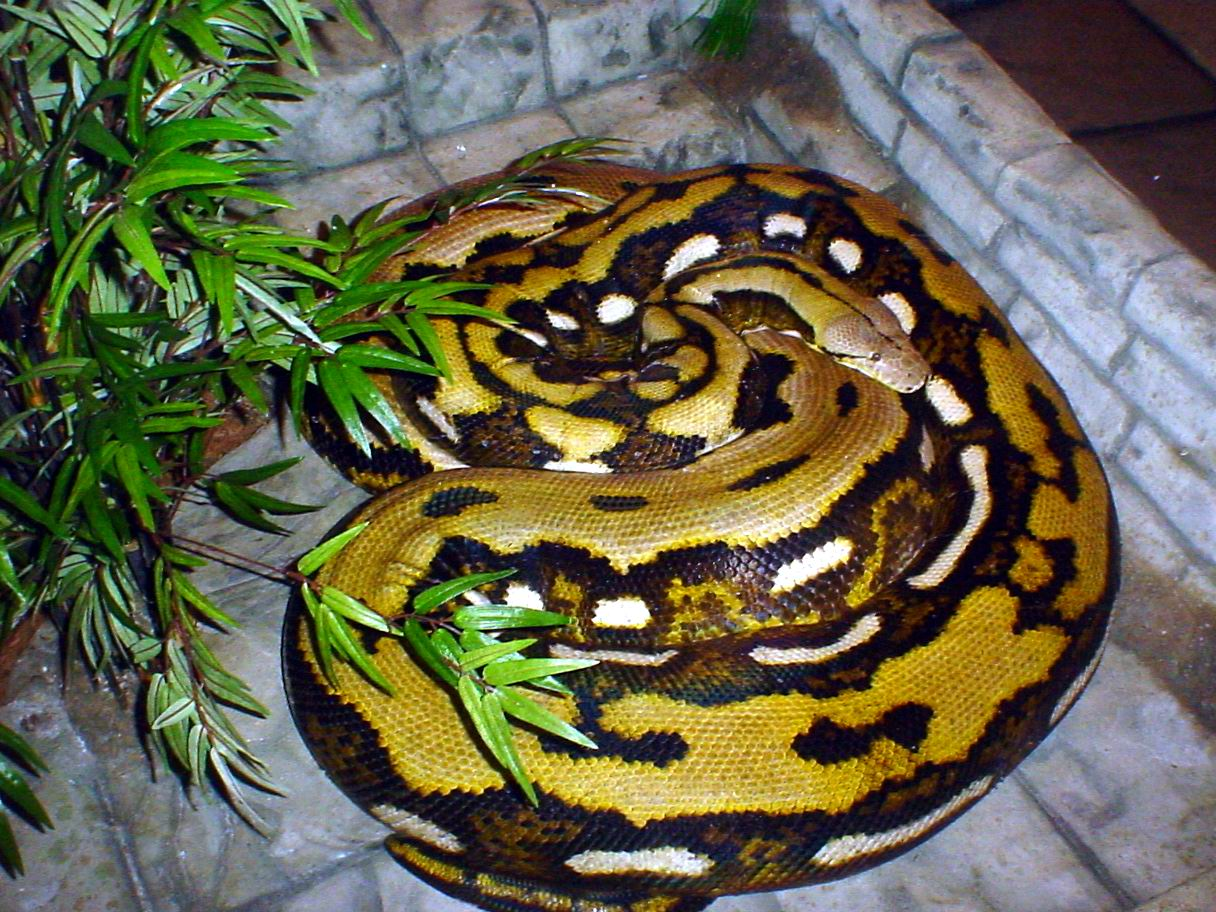
Fluffy at the Columbus Zoo

In March 2007, Fluffy, a reticulated python (Malayopython reticulatus) and Guinness World Records holder for the longest snake in captivity, measuring 24 feet (7.3 m), was put on display at the zoo.

In September 2007, the zoo purchased Fluffy from her owner, and she was on permanent display afterwards. On October 26, 2010, the 300-pound (140 kg), 18-year-old snake died. A necropsy found a tumorous mass on one of her ovaries. The zoo has since acquired her daughter named Hanna.

== Other attractions ==
=== Mangels-Illions Carousel ===
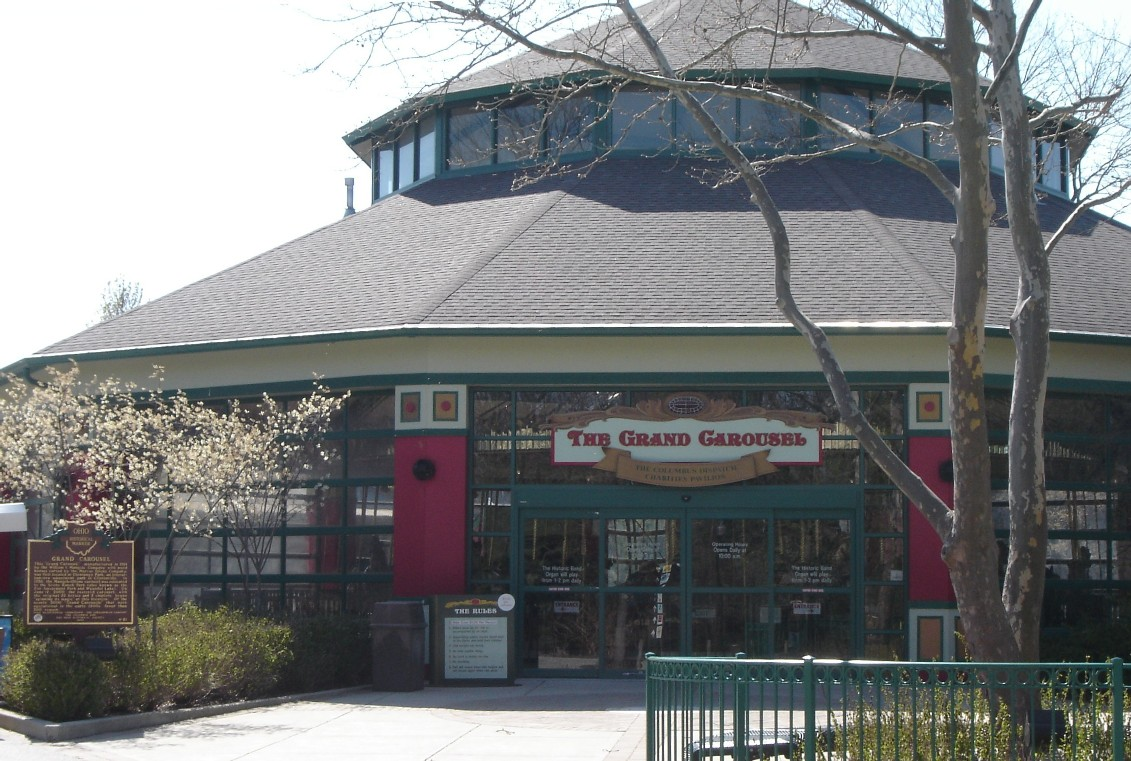
The Mangels-Illions Carousel, post-restoration

In the spring of 2000, the zoo added its restored 1914 Mangels-Illions carousel. This carousel had originally been built for the former Olentangy Park in Clintonville. When the park closed in 1937 and the land and rides sold in 1938, the carousel was moved to Wyandot Lake where it continued operating for sixty years, though in deteriorating condition.

In 1999, the carousel was removed from Wyandot Lake and underwent a million dollar restoration before being moved to a new location at the zoo. With 52 hand carved horses, two chariots, and a Wurlitzer #153 band organ (which plays upon request), this rare "grand carousel" in the Coney Island style is one of only a few manufactured by the William F. Mangels Company with wooden horses carved by M. C. Illions and Sons Carousell Works, and is thus known as a Mangels-Illions carousel. It was ridden 42,000 times in its first month of operation at the zoo, and celebrated its one millionth rider on July 28, 2004.

=== Zoombezi Bay ===
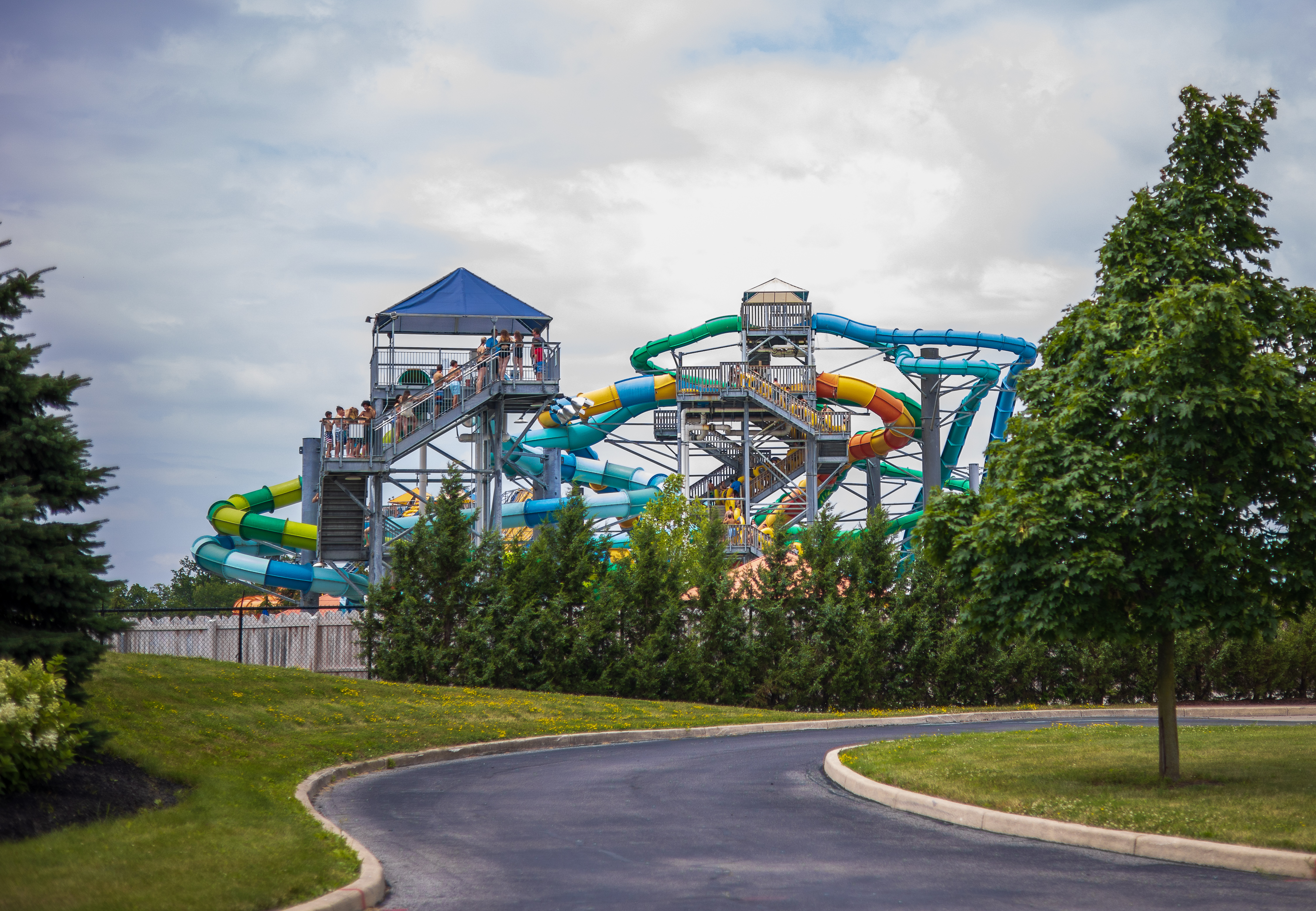
A view of part of the Zoombezi Bay water park

The zoo purchased Wyandot Lake at the end of 2006 and have renovated the park into "Zoombezi Bay". The water park opened in May 2008 and contains 17 major slides and attractions.

=== Rides At Adventure Cove ===
When the zoo bought Wyandot Lake, it split the park into two sections. They used "Jungle Jack's Landing" as the name for the dry ride section of the park when it first opened in May 2008 alongside Zoombezi Bay, it features 14 rides and attractions, including the historical Sea Dragon roller coaster. In 2020, "Jungle Jack's Landing" was renamed to "Rides At Adventure Cove" to tie into the neighboring Adventure Cove area of the Columbus Zoo and Aquarium which opened for the first time on the same year.

== Conservation ==
Scenery in Asia Quest making visitors aware of illegal animal trades

The Columbus Zoo and Aquarium runs a conservation program that funds multiple projects outside of the zoo. In 2010, the zoo provided more than $2 million worth of grants to support conservation projects worldwide. These monies come from fundraisers, visitor donations and privately raised funds. Projects the zoo supports include the Dian Fossey Gorilla Fund, the International Elephant Foundation, and the Ohio Wildlife Center.

In an effort to increase funding for, and public awareness of, the conservation projects around the world, the Columbus Zoo has in recent years incorporated information about threatened and endangered species into exhibits. In addition to helping visitors become more aware, the zoo has also added donation boxes that help fund the many projects the Columbus Zoo supports.

The Columbus Zoo is also involved in conservation programs internally. Manatee Coast, while built as an exhibit, is also a rehabilitation facility for injured manatees. Due to the threatened status of manatees in the wild, Manatee Coast attempts to inform its visitors of the manatee's situation, with an entire room dedicated to manatee conservation. This room includes a video describing the manatee's natural habitat and what can be done to protect them.

The Columbus Zoo also runs a breeding program for Mexican wolves. This program has the goal of having a population of at least 100 wolves living in what was once their natural range. Mexican wolves became extinct in the wild in the mid-20th century due to being trapped, poisoned, and shot. Since the zoo became involved in 1992, 29 pups have been born at their facility.
