= Lightning (Revere Beach) =

Revere Beach Lightning
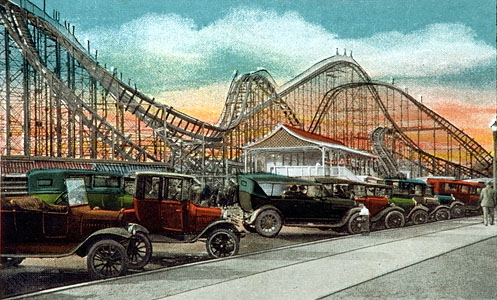
- Postcard illustrating the Lightning roller coaster at Revere Beach

Revere Beach
- Location: Revere Beach
- Coordinates: 42.420°N 70.986°W
- Status: Removed
- Opening date: July 2, 1927
- Closing date: 1933

General statistics
- Manufacturer: Traver Engineering
- Designer: Harry G. Traver
- Model: Giant Cyclone Safety Coaster
- Inversions: 0
- Revere Beach Lightning at RCDB

Lightning was a wooden roller coaster that operated from 1927 until 1933 at Revere Beach in Revere, Massachusetts. It was one of the infamous Giant Cyclone Safety Coasters which were constructed by noted roller coaster engineer Harry G. Traver in the mid-1920s (the rides were, in fact, anything but safe, and became known as the "terrifying triplets"). Lightning was the only Giant Cyclone Safety Coaster not to bear the "Cyclone" name, as a roller coaster named Cyclone already existed at Revere Beach when Lightning was constructed in 1927. The other two members of this group of coasters included the Crystal Beach Cyclone and the Palisades Park Cyclone (A fourth Traver roller coaster named Zip had a similar—but smaller—design and was installed at Oaks Amusement Park in Portland, Oregon).

== Ride layout and structure ==
Although the precise dimensions of Lightning are not reported, its common design heritage with the Crystal Beach Cyclone suggests that these coasters share many technical specifications, such as heights around 100 feet (30 m), many steeply-banked turns and a ground-level figure 8 track. In fact, there was no truly straight track apart from the station. Lightning's hybrid steel structure allowed for much more steeply banked curves than would have been possible in an ordinary wooden-framed roller coaster of the day. These steeply banked tracks often made quick transitions to steep banks in the opposite directions. These quick rolling transitions were one of the primary reasons for the violent nature of the Lightning.

== Ride experience and safety ==
Although the ride length was said to be fairly short (about 40 seconds in duration from the top of the lift hill), all the Giant Cyclone Safety Coasters were known for their intense and often brutal ride experience. The Lightning had already killed a rider by its second day of operation at Revere Beach. The incident occurred when a girl fell to her death from the coaster. The ride was then shut down for 20 minutes so that her body could be removed before operation resumed. The Lightning was not the only roller coaster at Revere Beach with a poor safety record, however; Derby Racer, for example, killed or critically injured at least 5 people in its 25 years of operation.

Despite the safety concerns, Lightning was initially popular. That popularity soon faded, however, due in part to its uncomfortable ride experience. Traver rides were called "rib-ticklers" because of the violent side-to-side motions that would inflict rib injuries on riders. The ride was so rough, in fact, that the phrase "take her on the Lightning" became a folk remedy for the termination of unwanted pregnancies in the Greater Boston area. High insurance premiums, the financial pressures of the Great Depression, and high maintenance costs inflicted by the Lightning's violent operation also contributed to its demise. Its demolition in 1933 meant that Lightning was the shortest-operating of the "Terrifying Triplets".
