= Sesquicentennial Cyclone =

Cyclone
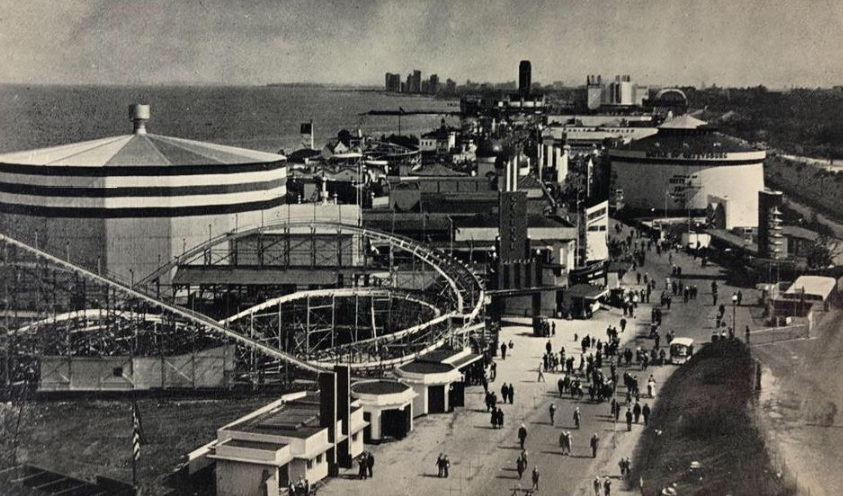
- Cyclone at Century of Progress in Chicago, 1933

Sesquicentennial Exposition
- Location: Sesquicentennial Exposition
- Coordinates: 39°54′31″N 75°10′24″W
- Status: Removed
- Opening date: May 31, 1926
- Closing date: November 30, 1926

General statistics
- Type: Wood
- Manufacturer: Traver Engineering
- Designer: Harry G. Traver
- Height: 60 ft (18 m)
- Length: 2,000 ft (610 m)
- Trains: Unknown number of trains with 10 cars; riders arranged 2 across in a single row for a total of 20 riders per train
- Cyclone at RCDB

The Sesquicentennial Cyclone was a steel-framed wooden roller coaster which was operated at the Philadelphia Sesquicentennial Exposition in 1926. Designed and built by Harry Traver of Traver Engineering, it was a medium-sized prototype of Traver's later Giant Cyclone Safety Coasters.

== History and design ==
The coaster was built as a smaller-scale prototype to the larger Giant Cyclone Safety Coasters (the "Terrifying Triplets") which Traver built in 1927. In addition to its innovative all-steel frame (described by promotional material as being "[s]trong as the Rock of Gibralter [sic]"), the coaster was also innovative in its use of aluminum-body roller coaster trains. The aluminum alloy used in the train bodies was said to be one used in aeronautical engineering. Construction of the Cyclone took approximately half the time of a comparable wooden roller coaster.

After the Sesquicentennial Exposition, the Cyclone was removed from the fairgrounds. Some sources report that it was put into storage for several years at the Traver Engineer Company's factory in Beaver Falls, Pennsylvania, whereas others report that the coaster was moved to the Alabama State Fairgrounds where it operated for several years. The Cyclone coaster which operated at the Century of Progress exposition between 1933 and 1934 in Chicago is also thought to be the same coaster. While at the Century of Progress, the coaster was first built near what is now Burnham Park, then later moved to a pier just south of the Adler Planetarium.

A number of sources suggest that this coaster was the first to ever bear the name "Cyclone", though other sources argue it was the Revere Beach Cyclone or another coaster.

== Ride experience ==
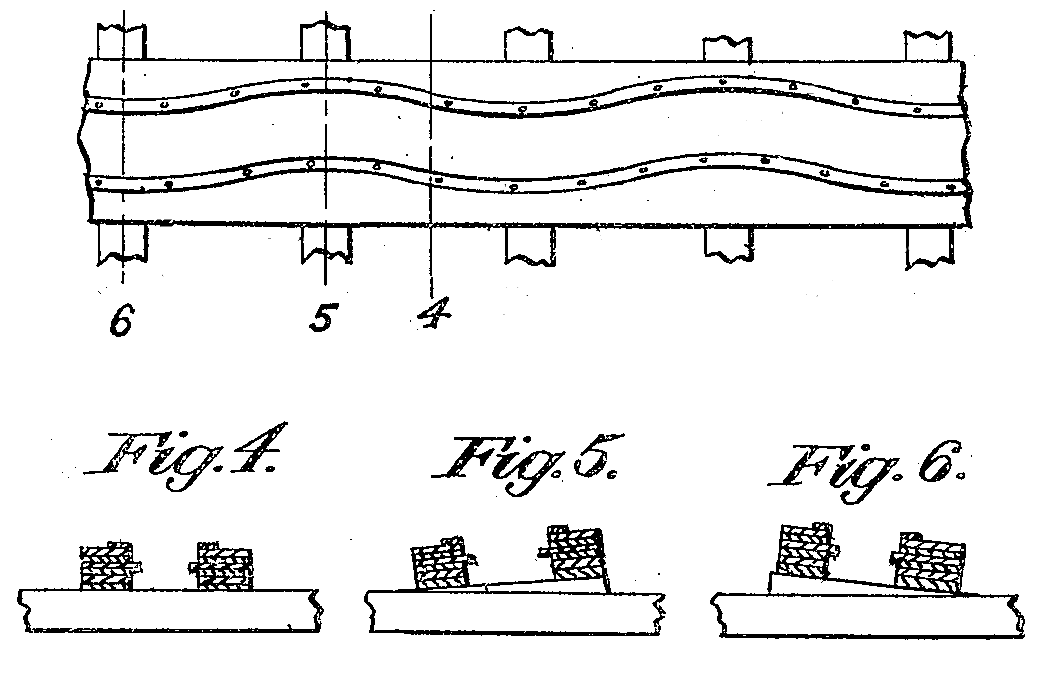
Diagram taken from one of Traver's patents of the rapidly undulating track utilized on the Sesquicentennial Cyclone and other Traver coasters

As with the later Giant Cyclone Safety Coasters, there was very little straight track in the Sesquicentennial Cyclone. The coaster was shorter and more compact than the "Terrifying Triplets" however. It was 60 feet (18 m) tall and operated in a footprint of 90 by 290 feet (27 by 88 m). It included the rapidly undulating "Jazz Track" which was characteristic of earlier Jazz Railways and the later Giant Cyclones.

The coaster grossed over $28,000 during the course of the Sesquicentennial Exposition while running at or near full capacity. It grossed over $75,000 at the Century of Progress in Chicago.
