= Thunderbolt (Savin Rock) =

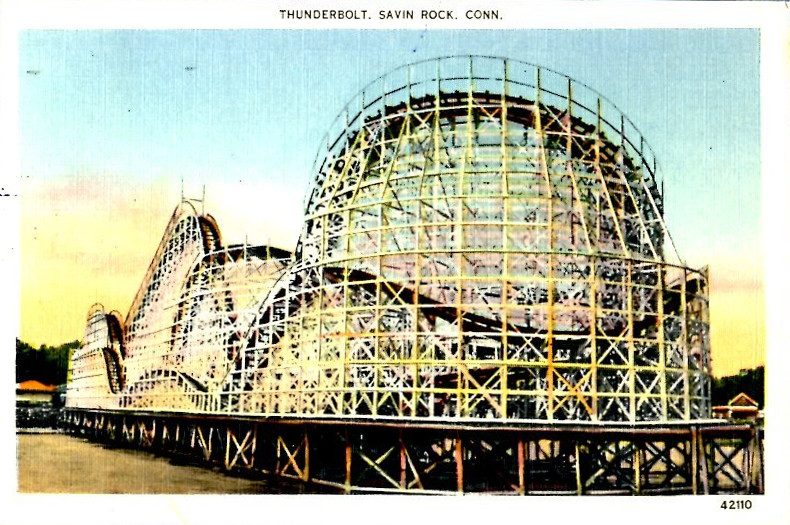
- Postcard of Thunderbolt

Savin Rock
- Location: Savin Rock
- Coordinates: 41.257°N 72.950°W
- Status: Removed
- Opening date: May 5, 1925
- Closing date: September 21, 1938

General statistics
- Type: Wood
- Manufacturer: Traver Engineering
- Designer: Frank Prior and Frederick Church
- Height: 92 ft (28 m)
- Length: 5,000 ft (1,500 m)
- Thunderbolt at RCDB

Thunderbolt was a wooden roller coaster which operated at Savin Rock Amusement Park in West Haven, Connecticut, from 1925 until 1938 when it was destroyed by a hurricane. It was rebuilt in modified form in 1939 and it continued to operate until 1956. When it was first built, it was purported to be the fastest roller coaster in the world.

== History ==
Originally named "The Bobs", the coaster was best known by its later name of Thunderbolt. It was designed by noted roller coaster engineers Frank Prior and Frederick Church and built by the Traver Engineering Company. The coaster was built approximately 500 feet (150 m) out onto Liberty Pier in Long Island Sound and could be easily seen from up and down the beach and from several nearby piers. It was quite popular, financially successful, and is thought to have driven at least one other nearby coaster out of business.

In 1936, the Thunderbolt was struck by lightning which caused damage to its mechanical operation. The coaster was closed the remainder of that year but reopened for the 1937 season. In 1938, however, the coaster was destroyed by the Great New England Hurricane. The coaster was rebuilt in 1939 and renamed the Giant Flyer. The ride was somewhat modified in this rebuild, however, and is thought to have become a less exciting ride as a result; it was demolished in 1957. The flagpole from the ride is preserved in the Savin Rock Museum.

== Layout and ride experience ==
Standing approximately 90 feet (27 m) tall and approximately 5,000 feet (1,500 m) long, Thunderbolt had a fearsome reputation and violent ride experience (as was common for Traver coasters). Its layout was very similar to the Revere Beach Cyclone (another Traver-built coaster). Although exact speeds are not given, several sources suggest that it was the fastest roller coaster in the world when it was built. The ride had several reported fatalities (before 1938), and it was said to shake riders so much that ride operators would collect valuables that fell loose to the pier floor. The ride had a much milder reputation after its rebuild in 1939.

== See also ==
- Cyclone (Revere Beach)
