= Crystal Beach Cyclone =

Amusement ride

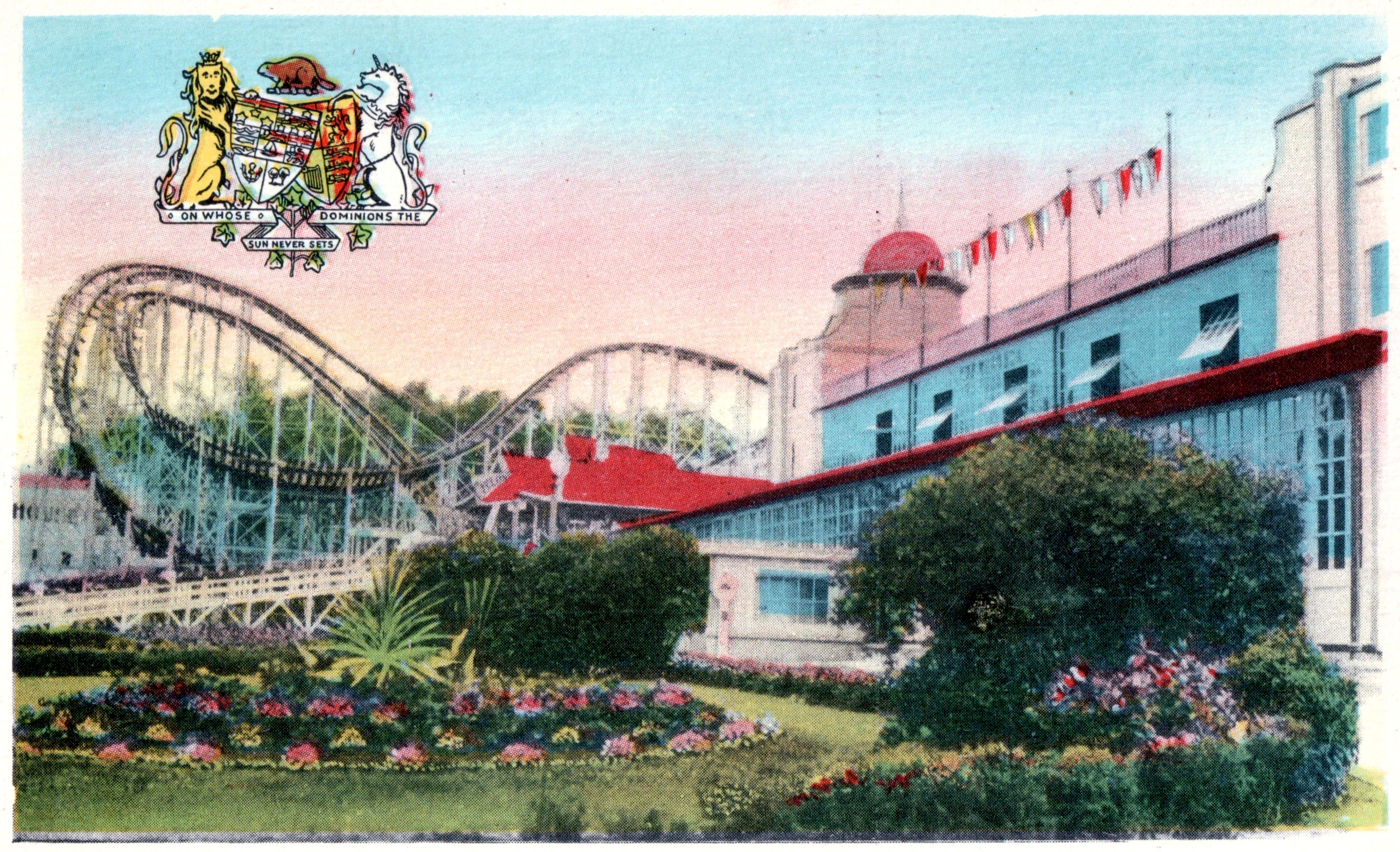
- Postcard image of the Cyclone, next to the Crystal Ball Room.

Crystal Beach Park
- Location: Crystal Beach Park
- Park section: Cyclone Bay
- Coordinates: 42.861699°N 79.059844°W
- Status: Removed
- Opening date: 1927
- Closing date: September 2, 1946
- Cost: $176,000 CDN

General statistics
- Type: Wood
- Manufacturer: Traver Engineering
- Designer: Harry G. Traver
- Track layout: Twister
- Lift/launch system: Chain-lift
- Height: 96 ft (29 m)
- Drop: 90 ft (27 m)
- Length: 2,953 ft (900 m)
- Speed: 60 mph (97 km/h)
- Duration: 1:10
- Max vertical angle: 59°
- Capacity: 85 riders per hour
- G-force: 4
- Crystal Beach Cyclone at RCDB

The Crystal Beach Cyclone was one of a 'Terrifying Triplet' of highly extreme and intense roller coasters designed and built by Harry G. Traver in the late 1920s. The Cyclone was located at the Crystal Beach Park in Crystal Beach, Ontario, Canada.

== History ==
Three of these coasters (known as the 'Terrifying Triplets' of the Giant Cyclone Safety Coasters) were designed and built. The Crystal Beach 'Cyclone' and the Revere Beach 'Lightning' were both opened in 1927. The following year, the Schneck brothers, owners of Palisades Park in Fort Lee, NJ, contracted Traver to build a 'Cyclone' for the 1928 season. Of the three, the Crystal Beach version was the most famous and longest lasting, eventually being dismantled in September 1946 due to the high maintenance costs and falling revenues. Some of the wood and steel from the Cyclone was used by John Allen and Herbert Schmeck (both designers for the Philadelphia Toboggan Company) in the construction of the Crystal Beach Comet coaster in 1948.

== Characteristics ==
Over 225 tonnes of metal were used in building the ride, which used a steel support structure instead of the more traditional wood. Despite this, it is still considered a wooden roller coaster, due to the construction of the track, being 300-by-25-millimetre (11.81 by 0.98 in) wood laminants topped by a flat steel rail. The total length of wood used was about 6,100 metres (20,000 ft; 3.8 mi) — all British Columbia fir. At night, a thousand small incandescent lamps lit the ride.

== Ride experience ==
The layout consisted of a twisted arrangement of track with many curved, and steeply angled drops, banking at up to 80 degrees, the trains traversed multiple banked spirals and figure-8 sections. Other than one trim brake, there were no brake runs outside of the station as there were no level portions of track where brakes could be located (The trim brake was between the spiral's exit and the figure 8 element).

=== Ride features ===
- curve out of the station onto the lift
- the chain lift
- a spiraling first drop about 90 feet tall
- a second hill which ended about 82 feet above the ground
- an abrupt left turn down the second drop at 52 degrees
- a spiral drop
- the emergency brakes
- a steep drop into the high speed figure eight
- another drop and "hops" under the lift hill
- a 210 degree high speed turn under the coaster's superstructure
- a "zigzag" or "jazz twister" track (now called trick track)
- a series of track which rose and fell like small, one foot bunny hops, leading back to the station

The Cyclone was said to place over 4 Gs of force on passengers, and had a top speed approaching 97 kilometres per hour (60 mph). Although the G-force statistic is likely true (and in fact may be low), the top speed advertised might be an exaggeration. The maximum velocity attainable from lift height to ground level, which the first drop did, would be 84 kilometres per hour (52 mph) with a zero initial velocity. If the Cyclone imparted an initial velocity to the cars at the top of the hill (say from a lift chain) the cars may have reached such advertised speeds.

=== Differences between designs ===
All three were very similar in their design, following the same basic layout. The main difference in the design was that the spiral on the Cyclone at Palisades was even tighter than the two preceding coasters because of the extremely limited space in the park.

== Operation ==
The ride ran one or two trains consisting of three or five four-passenger cars, depending on crowds. Later, the trains were permanently reduced to three cars to keep forces on the structure lower.

Ride time was around 40 seconds, discounting station to top of the lift, which extended the time to about 70 seconds. This would have been slightly faster than before opening day because almost half a metre had been removed from the height of the second hill due to roll-back problems.

Reports say the ride at Crystal Beach drew 75,000 on opening day and crowds were so heavy that a railing was broken by those pushing to get close to the new ride. One patron rode 67 times that day and on its second day of operation, two boys rode 52 times.

=== Accidents and incidents ===
Over 5 million rides were given in the Cyclone's 20-year history with only one fatality. This occurred on opening day May 30, 1938, when 22-year-old Amos Wiedrich allegedly stood up to take his suitcoat off. He was thrown from the train after the first drop and fell to his death, being hit seconds later by the train he had been riding in. At the inquest however, a failed lap bar was deemed to be the cause and the rider's estate was awarded $3000 by the court.

Yvonne Salais died on the second day of sister coaster Lightning's operation, in 1927, after having jumped out.

The Crystal Beach ride also kept a nurse in the station who was there to assist anyone who fainted, although she was originally hired to help lower insurance costs. Later, it is rumored that she was kept on the payroll to help keep the Cyclone known as one of the fiercest coasters around. Popular coaster lore says that she kept smelling salts ready, and that a hot dog stand adjacent to the coaster sold splints.

=== Maintenance issues ===
These coasters, unfortunately, turned out to be a maintenance headache due to the high forces generated on the structure. Some reduction was gained through the use of three-car trains, but the track still suffered. According to Robert Cartmell's book "The Incredible Scream Machine: A History of the Roller Coaster", a man who worked at Palisades while the Traver-designed Cyclone operated said that he could not remember one week where it operated every day. Structural and mechanical failures prevented it from being able to be open on anything resembling a regular schedule, and the ride's sheer viciousness did not endear it to the park's visitors.

In 1938, the entire ride at Crystal Beach was overhauled (supposedly by Herbert Schmeck) with many extra stress ties added.

== Reception ==
Ed Cowley, who had ridden The "Cyclone" many times, said:

The first couple of turns were knockouts. Then you got into that section which is a figure 8, and that's where people got stiff necks. You got thrown from one side of the car to the other so fast you didn't get a chance to prepare yourself. You must have been travelling at a tremendous speed through that figure 8. It was quite a blow. If you were riding with someone else, you'd get all mixed up with them. If you had a date, it could be quite fascinating - hands up or not.

Erma Andrews, who piloted biplanes from the age of 16 and became a registered nurse, rode the Crystal Beach Cyclone many times and recalled:

I rode the Cyclone a lot. I was quite used to thrilling rides—you know, 'ho-hum,' passé!'—but it was a real pisser! At one point, it looked like you were going to go right into the drink, because the ride was built on stilts, you see, and it jutted out over the lake, and you'd turn and swoop down right there. They had a nurse stationed at the end of it, because people would come off sick or injured. One time, they put me in the seat with this boy who was riding alone, and by the time the ride was over, I was in that boy's lap, holding on to him for dear life with my face in his neck. I don't know how I could have ended up there; they snugged that bar right down tight on your laps because they didn't want anyone to fall out, but the ride was so violent, that I guess we just got mixed in with each other. I was embarrassed and started to leave, but I guess the boy didn't mind any. He was laughing and grinning, and by the time I'd extricated myself from his lap, he'd already given them another ticket, and off we went again!

In September 2000, coasterglobe.com interviewed Ed Mills, who described riding the Cyclone in 1945:

My most memorable ride in an amusement park occurred in July 1945, when I was on military leave in St. Catharines, Ontario. I had just turned 18 and had been in the Canadian Army for about 8 months. My two buddies and I spent a part of our leave in Crystal Beach, Ontario, which at that time was considered to be one of the greatest places for servicemen to have a good time. Besides, Crystal Beach was famous for having the most thrilling roller coaster ride in the Western Hemisphere. Being soldiers of course, and having been trained for all kinds of warfare, we had "no fear" of anything, except perhaps Military Police, and since we were on a legal pass, there was "nothing to fear". As soon as we entered the park one evening, we headed straight for the roller coaster, which was identified with a huge sign announcing "The Cyclone--Thrill of a Lifetime". After listening to the loud screams coming from the roller coaster, we decided that we must go on it right away, and promptly bought our tickets, which were I think about 15 cents or maybe 20 cents. We then stood in the line-up near the entrance gate, which happened to be very close to where the previous passengers got off. It was then that I first noticed the distinctive smell of vomit which was stronger as we got closer to the loading point. It was a bit disconcerting, but I was then immediately distracted by getting a whack in the face from something kind of leathery. It turned out to be a wallet which had fallen from the ride, and we opened it and it had a US Navy ID Card in it. As soon as the ride stopped, we saw the US sailor getting off the ride and called to him. He looked a bit dazed, and did not realize what had happened to his wallet.

It was then our turn to ride, and we ran to the coaster cars. Up the steep ramp we went, up, up and then up some more until we could see the entire amusement park. Just as I was enjoying the view, the car lurched forward and I looked in front of me down a steep incline that looked to me to be about an 89 degree slope. The cars then headed down the incline at warp speed, and all I could see in front of us was Lake Erie. I was sure there must have been a part of the tracks missing, and I then uttered my only two words during the entire ride... "Jesus Christ!" ...as we plunged down towards the Lake, I then saw a steep bank to the right of the incline and we changed directions in a split second, turning violently on our side as the car careened around a hairpin turn. I looked sideways and saw the earth spinning by, and from that point on, most of the ride was pretty much of a blur. The only other memorable part was as we reached a high horizontal point again, we were racing around a curve at such speed that it seemed certain that we would fly off into thin air. Very frankly, I was quite relieved to see the cars finally slowing down...even then, they approached the unloading platform at such a speed that one would think they would overshoot and go right into the spectators.

When I walked off the unloading platform, I couldn't help but smell the vomit again, and in fact, walked away from the area fairly promptly in order to resettle my own stomach.
