= Giant Cyclone Safety Coasters =

Roller coaster line designed by Harry Traver

Giant Cyclone Safety Coasters were a model line of roller coasters designed and marketed by Harry Traver and his company Traver Engineering in the 1920s. Despite their name, they had a reputation of being dangerous and are regarded by many historians as some of the most fearsome roller coasters ever built.

== Characteristics and design ==
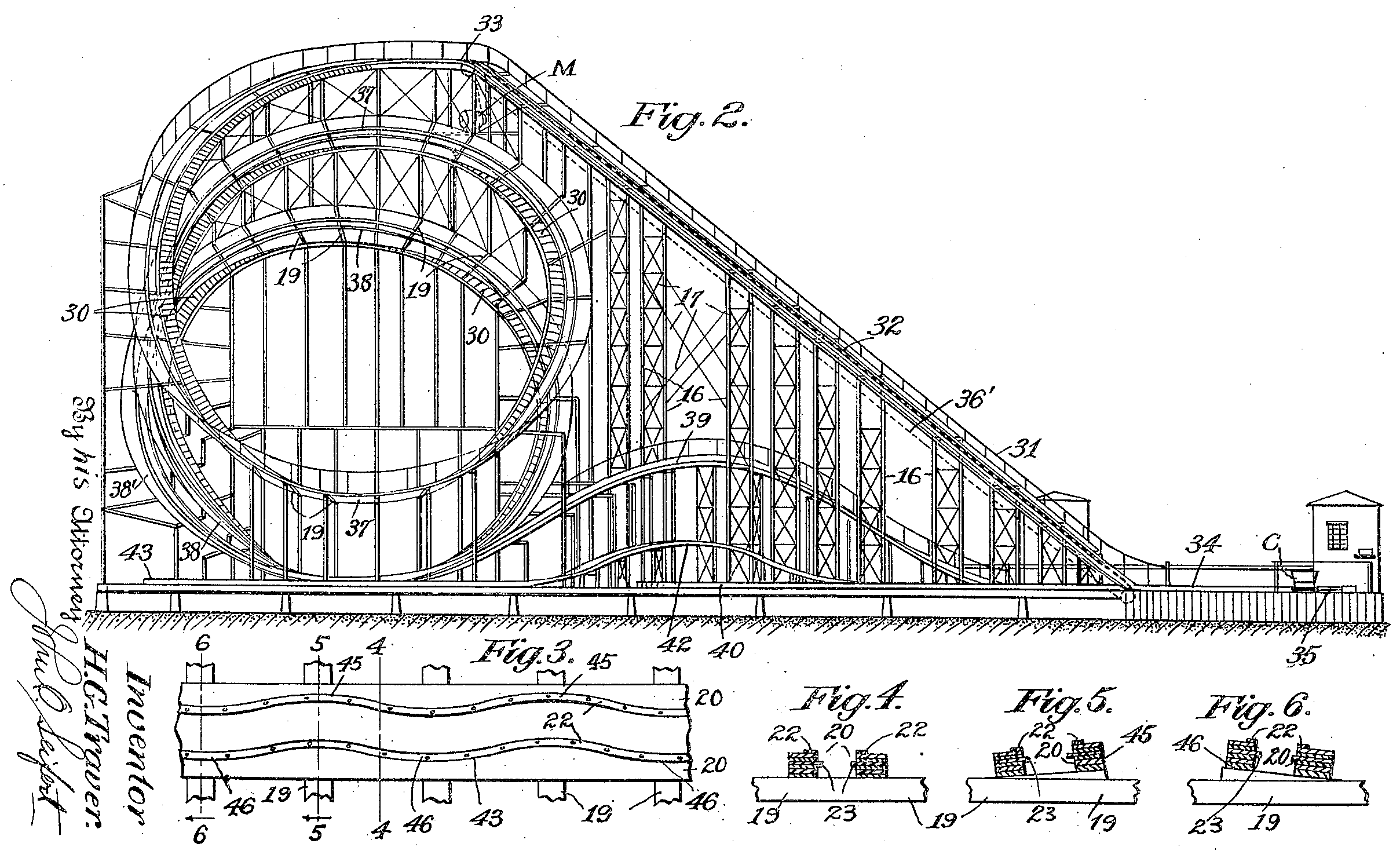
Patent for Traver's Cyclone coaster design. Note the undulating track diagrammed in lower section of diagram.

Robert Cartmell described Traver's coasters as embodying "the reckless spirit of the 1920s". They featured fully steel frames and laminated wood and steel track. Wood was stacked between 6 and 9 boards thick, depending on the coaster. The frames were fabricated in Pittsburgh, Pennsylvania and then shipped by rail to their building sites. The building sites were typically level and near beaches or piers. The main exception was The Palisades Cyclone which suffered increased maintenance problems as a result. The laminated wood also had problems with moisture at many locations.

The geometry of Giant Cyclone Safety Coasters was extreme compared to their contemporaries, featuring very tight turns, spirals, and figure eights. These elements drew inspiration from the swoops and spirals of earlier Prior and Church roller coasters like The Bobs. Curves on Giant Cyclone Safety Coasters were often banked to much steeper angles, with some approaching 85 degrees. Beyond the many curves, another element common to the steel-framed Traver coasters were undulating "jazz tracks", meaning that Traver's Cyclones had almost no straight track in their entire course.

== Marketing ==
The benefits of a steel-framed structure was one of the biggest selling points which was put forward by the Traver Engineering Company. Quicker (and therefore less costly) set-up times were one promoted aspect of the all-steel frames. A resistance to fire and rot were other advantages over wood that were advertised for Giant Cyclone Safety Coasters. Despite the advertisement of low maintenance costs, however, these coasters were actually quite demanding on a maintenance crew. What little wood there was experienced moisture problems, and the coasters were not wholly invulnerable to fire either. The Palisades Park Cyclone, for example, was damaged when the wooden track on the coaster partially burned.

== Examples and related coasters ==
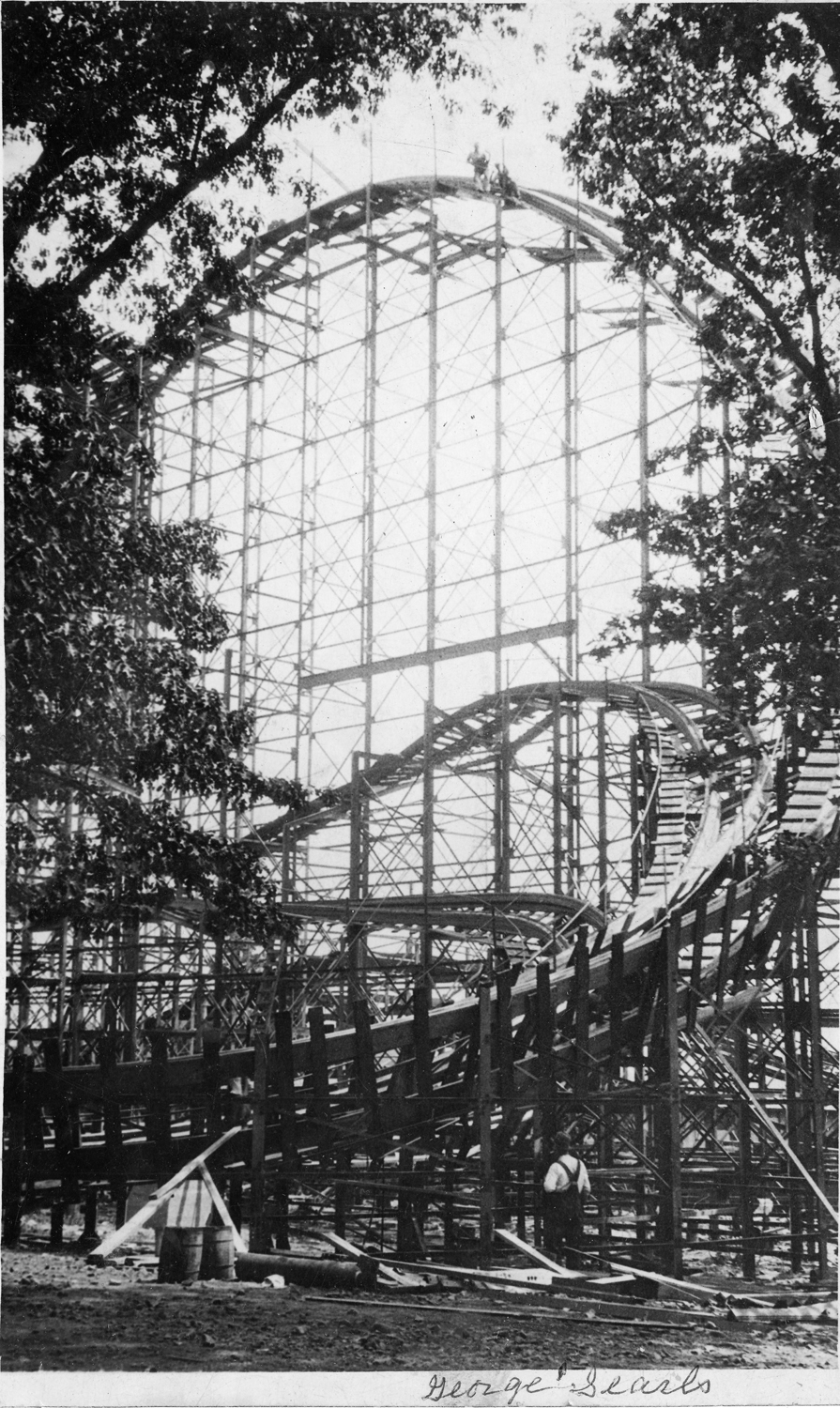
The Palisades Cyclone under construction in 1927

=== Predecessors and prototypes ===
The model line of Jazz Railways (built at Rocky Glen Park and other locations) was marketed by Traver as the first roller coaster to utilize a completely steel frame. Its stretches of rapidly undulating track were also an innovative feature that saw use in the later Traver Cyclones.

The next step towards the Giant Cyclone Safety Coasters was the Sesquicentennial Cyclone at the Sesquicentennial Exposition in Philadelphia (and several other later locations). The installations of this coaster used the steel frame design introduced with the Jazz Railway, but began to add in the extreme elements which were characteristic of the "Terrifying Triplets" and the Giant Cyclone Safety Coasters more generally. The main difference was the scale. The Sesquicentennial Cyclone was larger than the Jazz Railways, but smaller than the "Terrifying Triplets".

=== The Terrifying Triplets ===
The Terrifying Triplets was a nickname given to three roller coasters which were opened or built by Traver in 1927. The Crystal Beach Cyclone was the first to open, followed by the Revere Beach Lightning and then the Palisades Cyclone. Each coaster had the characteristic steel-frame structure with wood-laminated steel track typical of Traver-designed coasters. The rides were relatively short in duration but notable for their lack of straight track. Their trains had five 4-seat cars, which differed from the ten 2-seat cars of the Sesquicentennial Cyclone. These heavier cars are also thought to have exacerbated maintenance problems on the Terrifying Triplets.

=== Other Giant Cyclones ===
The least well known Giant Cyclone Safety Coaster was the Zip at Oaks Amusement Park in Portland, Oregon. The Zip was a compact version of the "Terrifying Triplets", and it opened the same year (1927) as Traver's other Cyclones; however, the track length was shortened because of space limitations at Oaks. It also featured shorter trains.
