= Cyclone (Revere Beach) =

Former roller coaster in Revere, MA, USA

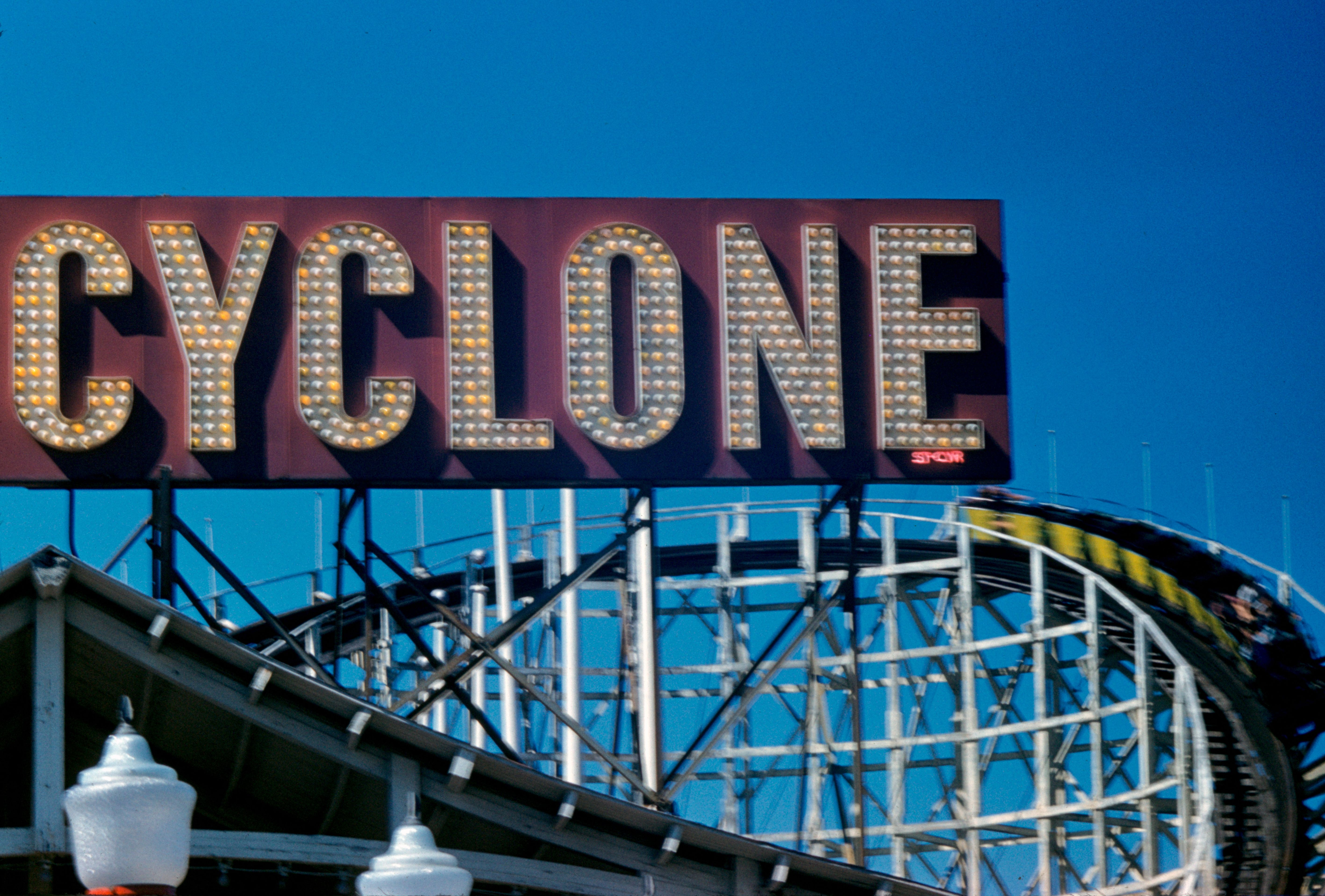
- Cyclone sign, August 1961

Revere Beach
- Location: Revere Beach
- Coordinates: 42.420°N 70.986°W
- Status: Removed
- Opening date: 1925
- Closing date: 1969
- Cost: $125,000

General statistics
- Type: Wood
- Manufacturer: Traver Engineering
- Designer: Frederick Church
- Height: 100 ft (30 m)
- Length: 3,600 ft (1,100 m)
- Speed: 45 mph (72 km/h)
- Inversions: 0
- Capacity: 1400 riders per hour
- Cyclone at RCDB

The Cyclone was a wooden roller coaster that operated at Revere Beach in Revere, Massachusetts, from 1925 until 1969. When Cyclone was constructed, it was the tallest roller coaster ever built, as well as being the first roller coaster in the world to reach 100 feet (30 m) in height. In addition to being the tallest roller coaster of its day, some also claim that it was the largest and fastest roller coaster in the world, with a length of 3,600 feet (1,100 m) and top speeds between 45 and 50 mph (some dispute the speed record claim and instead award that honor to the Giant Dipper). Cyclone held the title of world's tallest roller coaster until 1964 when it was surpassed by Montaña Rusa at La Feria Chapultepec Mágico in Mexico City, Mexico.

Given its location near the Atlantic Ocean, Cyclone would take much damage throughout the years from ocean storms, flooding, and blizzards. Despite the abuse the coaster took from the ocean, however, it was a fire that eventually destroyed the Cyclone. When first fire occurred in 1969, it was an event that signaled the demise of the Revere Beach amusement industry. The coaster's charred ruins were finally torn down in 1974, after a second, more intense, damaging blaze.

As with Coney Island in Brooklyn, New York, Revere Beach's attractions were owned by a variety of amusement operators, with the Cyclone being owned by the Shayeb family. In its heyday, Cyclone was a popular ride, regularly transporting as many as 1,400 riders per hour—a rate which was quickly able to recoup the 125,000 dollar cost of the coaster.

== Design and construction ==
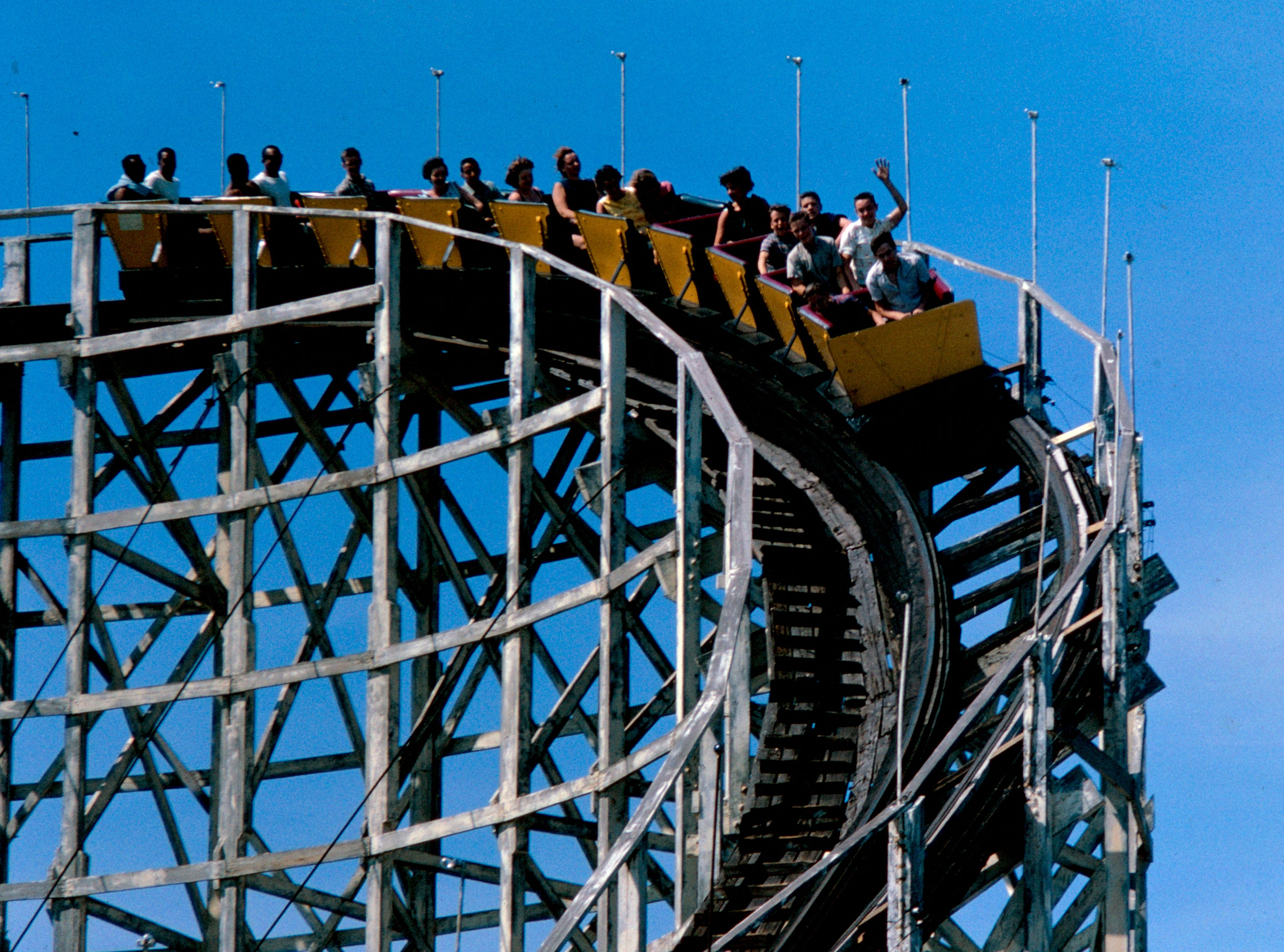
People riding the coaster in August 1964

Cyclone was constructed by the notable roller coaster builder and pioneer Harry Traver of Traver Engineering and designed by Frederick Church. It was similar in design to another Traver-built coaster at Savin Rock, the Thunderbolt.

Cyclone was one of two roller coasters that Traver built at Revere Beach, the other one being the Lightning. Lightning was part of a model line known as "Giant Cyclone Safety Coasters". These coasters were steel-framed coasters, which, ironically enough, had a particularly poor safety record. Because Cyclone predated Lightning at Revere Beach, Lightning was the only Cyclone Safety Coaster to not share the Cyclone name of its sister coasters.

== See also ==
- Thunderbolt (Savin Rock)

Preceded by Giant Coaster	World's Tallest Roller Coaster; 1925–1964	Succeeded by Montaña Rusa
Preceded by Giant Coaster	World's Tallest Complete Circuit Roller Coaster; 1925–1964	Succeeded by Montaña Rusa
