= Sesquicentennial Exposition =

1926 world's fair in Philadelphia, US

Coordinates: 39°54′31″N 75°10′24″W

- Date: July 4, 1926; 100 years ago
- Frequency: Semicentennially
- Location: United States of America
- Previous event: Centennial (1876)
- Next event: Bicentennial (1976)
- Major events: 150th anniversary of the adoption of the Declaration of Independence
- President: Calvin Coolidge

The Sesqui-Centennial International Exposition of 1926 was a world's fair in Philadelphia, Pennsylvania. Its purpose was to celebrate the 150th anniversary of the signing of the United States Declaration of Independence, and the 50th anniversary of the 1876 Centennial Exposition.

Sesquicentennial Exhibition Joint Resolution
- Long title: Joint Resolution Providing for the cooperation of the United States in the sesquicentennial exhibition commemorating the signing of the Declaration of Independence, and for other purposes.
- Enacted by: the 68th United States Congress

Citations
- Statutes at Large: 43 Stat. 1053

Legislative history
- Introduced in the House as H.J.Res. 352 on January 12, 1925; Passed the House on February 21, 1925 (Voice vote); Passed the Senate on February 28, 1925 (Voice vote); Signed into law by President Calvin Coolidge on March 3, 1925

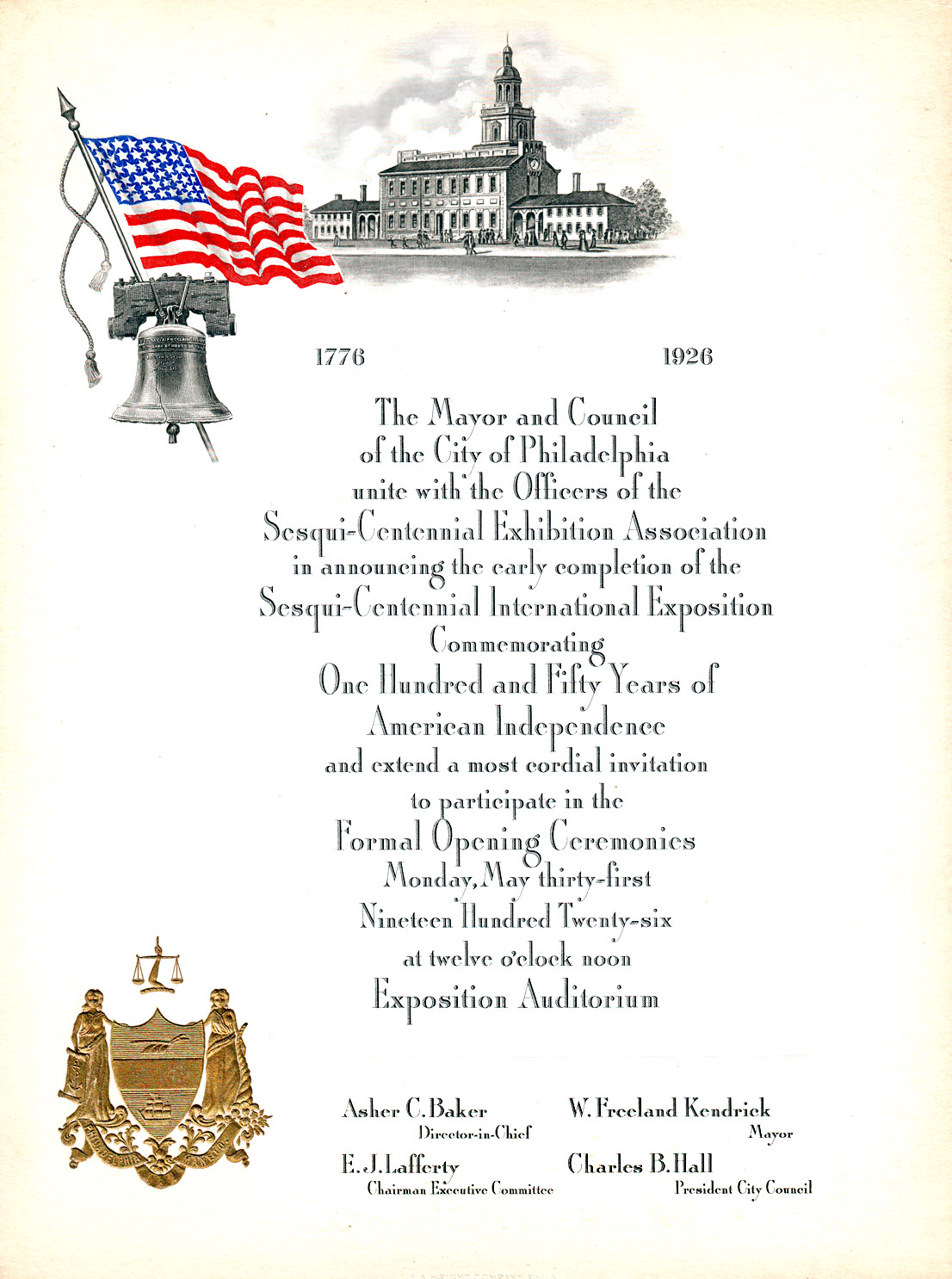
An engraved invitation to the opening ceremonies of the 1926 Sesqui-Centennial Exposition held in Philadelphia, Pennsylvania, May 31, 1926

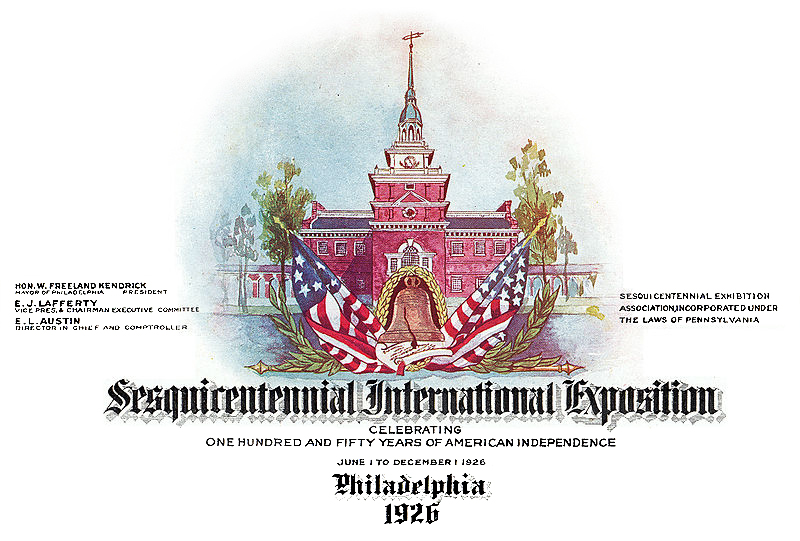
Sesquicentennial International Exposition logo

== History ==
=== Planning ===
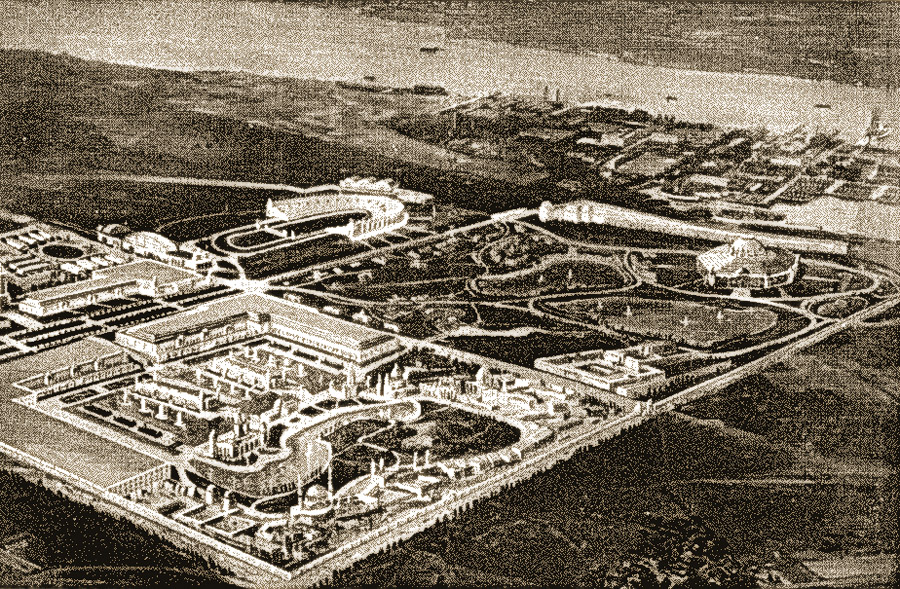
The 1926 Sesqui-Centennial Exposition grounds

In 1916, the idea for a Sesquicentennial Exposition stemmed from the mind of John Wanamaker, who was the only living member of the Centennial Exposition's Finance Committee. At the time Philadelphia was a booming city, in terms of size and opportunity; however, it suffered from corruption on political and financial fronts. Wanamaker was well aware of the city's corruption, and believed a fair could redeem Philadelphia's reputation. He believed by hosting another world's fair, the restoration of the city's integrity, patriotism, and industry would emerge. By the end of August 1916, Wanamaker received the support of Howard French, the president of the Philadelphia Chamber of Commerce. In October, plans were underway, and French assigned a committee responsible for planning the "Great International Exposition of Philadelphia in 1926". The Fairmount Parkway, which was under construction, would be the official site of the exposition. In 1917 the United States found itself involved in World War I, which caused the planning for the Sesquicentennial Exposition to be placed on hold.

After World War I, Philadelphia suffered because of losses in the war, the spread of Spanish Influenza, and the hardships of Prohibition. These circumstances combined made the city's atmosphere bleak, even with the election of the new mayor J. Hampton Moore. Through these hardships, Wanamaker's hope and vision for a celebration of Philadelphia continued. Wanamaker took advantage of an interview on July 11, 1919, by using the opportunity to discuss his ideas for a 1926 world's fair. From this interview, he received the support of other notable Philadelphians as well as the Franklin Institute and Philadelphia Chamber of Commerce, who encouraged Mayor Moore to participate in immediate planning. By November 1920, Moore hosted an event to discuss and develop plans for the Sesquicentennial Exposition, resulting in the establishment of the Committee of 100. The committee's first meeting was held on January 24, 1921, renaming itself the Sesqui-Centennial Exhibition Association (SCEA). Mayor Moore had been elected as the SCEA's president, while Wanamaker was appointed honorary chairman to its board.

The honor of hosting this celebration was awarded to Philadelphia in 1921. Initial grand plans were scaled down tremendously by the time the fair opened. The original director of the exposition, Colonel David C. Collier, resigned in protest over these budget cuts. His replacement, Captain Asher C. Baker, retired due to illness days before the festival opened, leaving things in the hands of E. L. Austin. Baker died less than two weeks later.

=== Opening ===
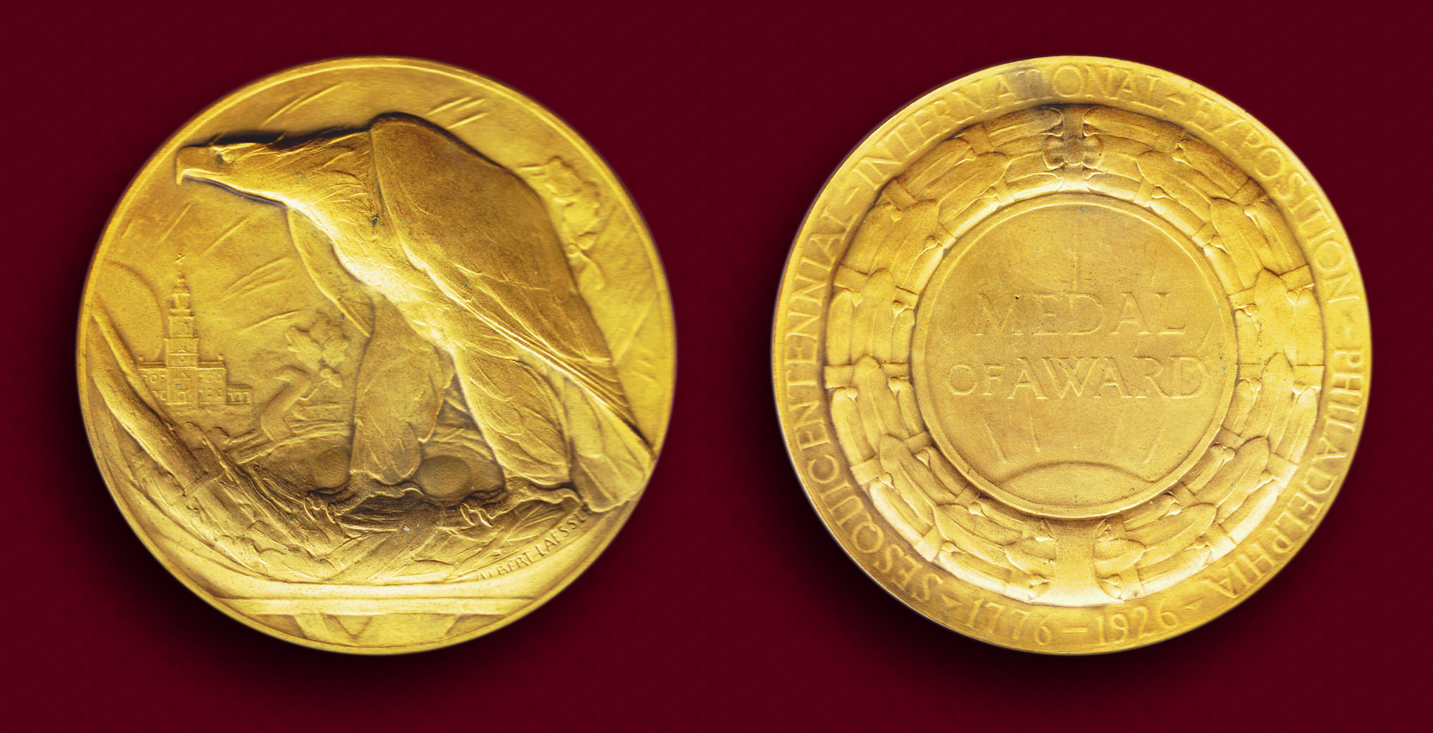
The Gold Medal of Award sculpted by Albert Laessle

The fair opened on May 31, 1926, and ran through November on grounds bounded by 10th Street, Packer Avenue, 23rd Street, and the U.S. Navy Yard (Terminal Avenue) in South Philadelphia. Originally known as League Island Park, these grounds are now occupied by FDR Park, Marconi Plaza, Packer Park Residential Neighborhood, the three stadiums of Philadelphia's massive South Philadelphia Sports Complex: Xfinity Mobile Arena, Lincoln Financial Field, and Citizens Bank Park, and the Philadelphia Eagles training complex which now occupy that portion of the grounds which from 1933 to 1993 were the site of Philadelphia Naval Hospital that was demolished 2001.

The senior draftsman for the design of the exposition buildings was a young Louis Kahn, later a world-renowned architect, then working under City Architect John Molitor. Sculptor Charles Tefft was chosen as the director of sculpture for the fair while noted Philadelphia sculptor and artist Albert Laessle created the fair's Medals of Award.

== Highlights ==
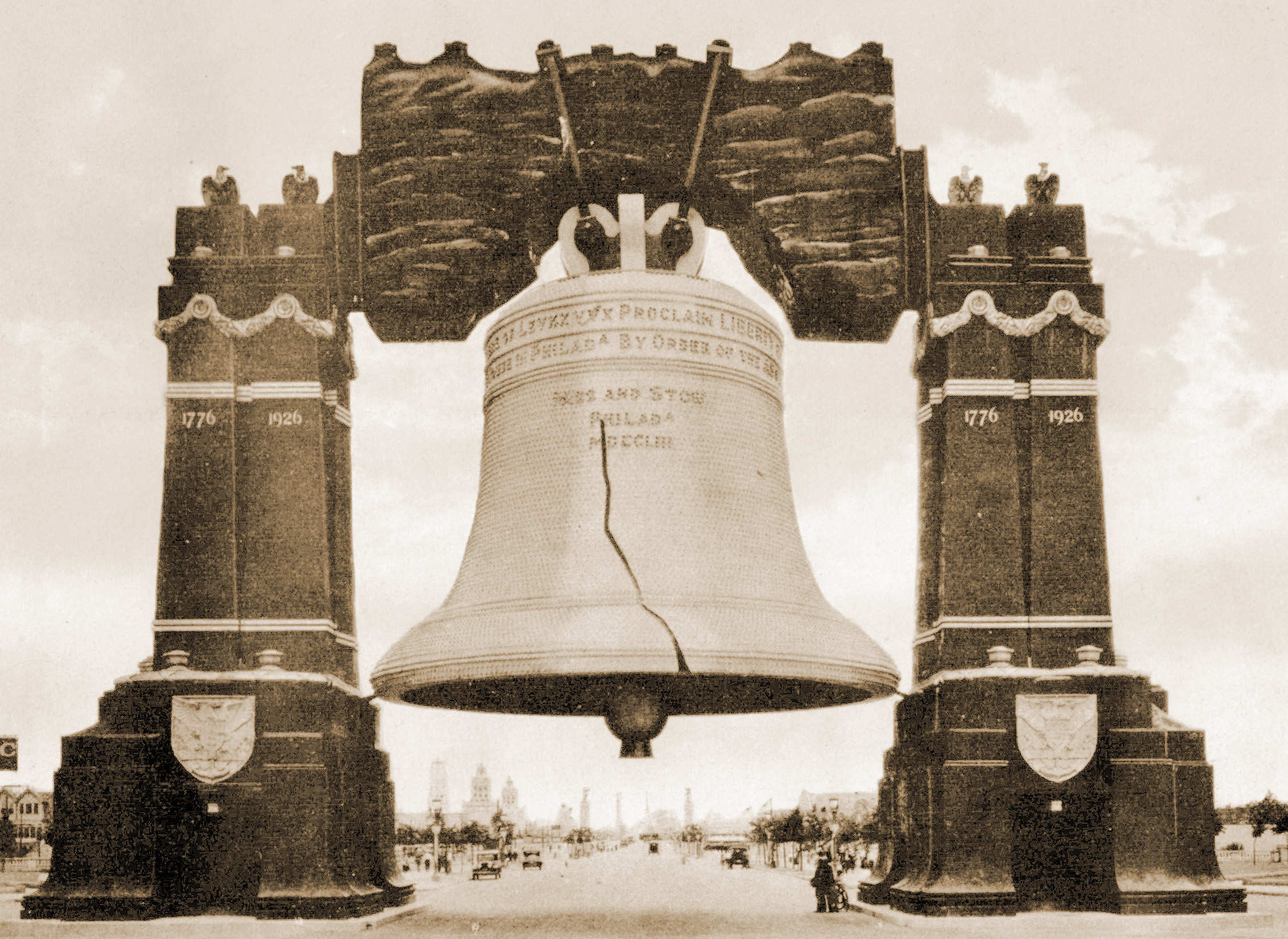
The 80-foot (24 m) tall illuminated Liberty Bell spanning Broad Street

Organizers constructed an 80-foot (24 m) replica of the Exposition's symbol, the Liberty Bell, covered in 26,000 light bulbs, at the gateway to the festival. Sesqui-Centennial Stadium (later known as Philadelphia Municipal Stadium and, after 1964, John F. Kennedy Stadium) was built in conjunction with the fair. The stadium had been a significant aspect of the fair, due to several events being held there. These events include religious ceremonies, the patriotic pageant known as "Freedom," and numerous sporting events. One of the most infamous events was the September 23rd championship boxing match between Jack Dempsey and Gene Tunney, which drew a crowd of 125,000 people standing in the rain to witness the occasion. Also on display at the exposition was the Curtis Organ, still one of the largest pipe organs in the world. In 1926 the first bridge (later renamed Benjamin Franklin Bridge) spanning the Delaware River between center city Philadelphia and Camden, New Jersey, was built in anticipation of the attending crowds.

Key speakers at the opening ceremonies were Secretary of State Frank B. Kellogg, Secretary of Commerce and future President Herbert Hoover, and Philadelphia Mayor W. Freeland Kendrick. At the center of the exposition along the main thoroughfare on a segment of south Broad Street known as the Southern Boulevard Parkway was the Forum of Founders consisting of the Court of Honor, the Liberal Arts and Agriculture Buildings, a group of sculptures and the Stairway of Nations facing on the opposing side the spectacular Tower of Light. Another highlight for fair goers, revolved around the recreation of Philadelphia's High Street during the city's colonial period. This area consisted of over twenty buildings, along with guides dressed in period clothing to interact with people.

The Exposition also included an amusement area, located within League Island Park. The area was designated as "Treasure Island." It occupied over five acres and was referred to as a children's paradise. A variety of amusements and entertainment were available. Included were a replica of the Canadian Rockies, a miniature railroad, mountain slide, Robinson Crusoe's Beach, a pirate's lair, boat rides and Noah's Ark complete with animals. The exposition had a number of roller coasters. These included The Cyclone, a prototype of Harry Traver's Giant Cyclone Safety Coasters and an installation of his Jazz Railway model of coaster.

Naval Air Facility Mustin Field was dedicated at the Philadelphia Navy Yard on September 17, 1926, in honor of Captain Henry C. Mustin, Navy Air Pilot No.3, and Naval Aviator No. 11, who recorded the first catapult launch from a moving vessel on November 5, 1915, when he flew off of USS North Carolina in a Curtiss Model AB-2. "It was a major event that drew 1,500 spectators, among them Assistant Secretary of the Navy, Theodore Douglas Robinson, Brig. Gen. Douglas MacArthur, Rear Adm. William Moffett, and Philadelphia Mayor W. Freeland Kendrick, who had been a childhood friend of Capt. Mustin. The dedication took place toward the end of the six-month Philadelphia Sesquicentennial Exposition, whose president was John Wanamaker. Thirty foreign nations attended the Sesqui, and all the planes from the exhibition flew in formation with aircraft of the Army, Navy, and Marine Corps to honor Mustin."

Among the foreign nations that attended the Sesquicentennial was China, represented by H. H. Kung.

== Reception and legacy ==
From its opening day on May 31, the exposition already faced challenges to its success. The fair opened with a heavy downpour of rain, causing many fairgoers to leave. However, one man, Jacob J. Henderson had been proud to be the first person to enter the fairgrounds at the 9:00 A.M. opening. He stated that he had been to the Centennial with his parents, and did not want to miss opening day of the Sesqui. Within the first hour, it is believed that less than 250 entered the gates of the fairgrounds. The fair drew a much smaller crowd than anticipated (about 10 million people). Variety dubbed it "America's Greatest Flop" with a loss of $20 million by August 1926. The exposition ended up unable to cover its debts and was placed into receivership in 1927, at which point its assets were sold at auction.

Benito Mussolini commemorated the Sesquicentennial by giving a $800,000 replica of Bernini's Fountain of Sea Horses to the city, which arrived after the fair closed. Installed in Fairmount Park, it was neglected for many years before being restored in 2013. A commemorative stamp, showing the Liberty Bell (Scott catalogue number 627) was printed, and two early United States commemorative coins were minted. Known as the United States Sesquicentennial coinage, they included a silver half dollar and a gold Quarter eagle. The fifty cent coin shows the heads of George Washington and Calvin Coolidge on the obverse, and the Liberty Bell on the reverse. The $2 1/2 coin has on the obverse Liberty holding a torch and the Declaration of Independence while standing on a globe; the reverse depicts Independence Hall. The stamp was issued in large numbers and is very inexpensive. The coins sold only moderately well, although both remain more common than many commemorative issues of this period.

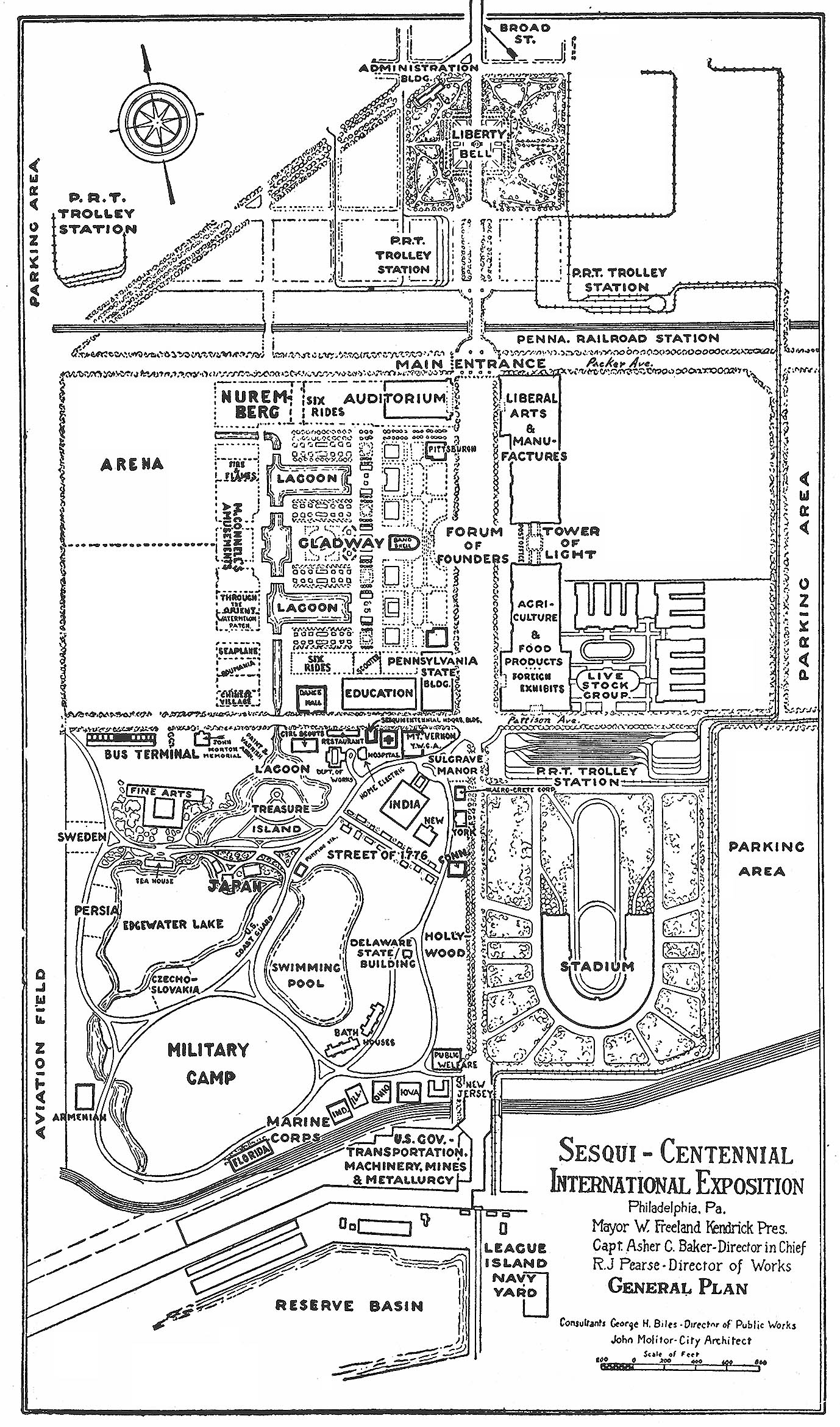
Diagram of the grounds of the 1926 Sesqui-Centennial Exposition

== See also ==
- Centennial Exposition, 100th anniversary of the United States (1876)
- United States Bicentennial, the 200th anniversary of the United States (1976)
- United States Semiquincentennial, the 250th anniversary of the United States (2026)
