= Cyclone (Palisades Amusement Park) =

Roller coaster in New Jersey, U.S.

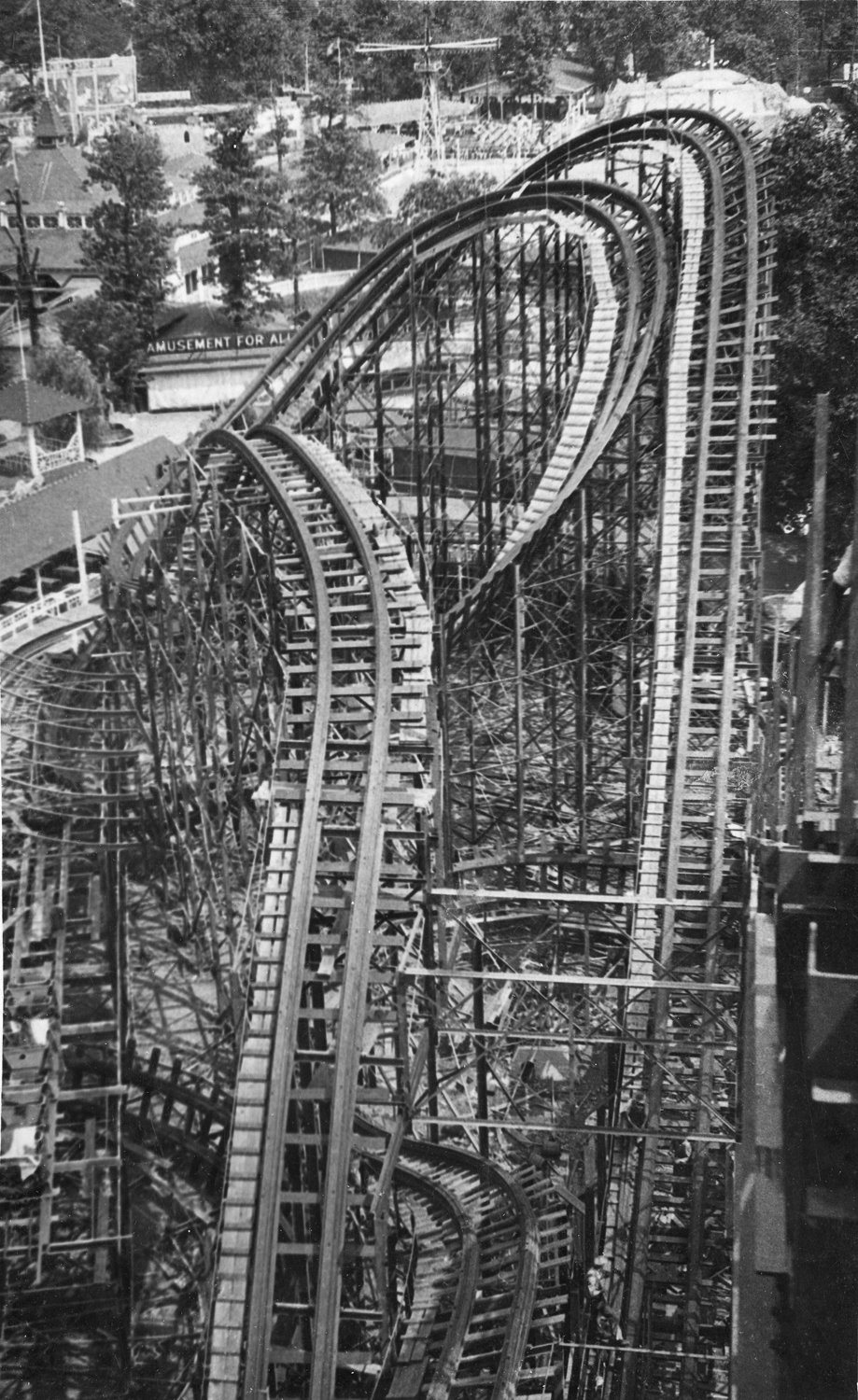

Palisades Amusement Park
- Location: Palisades Amusement Park
- Coordinates: 40.8281°N 73.9778°W
- Status: Removed
- Opening date: September 10, 1927
- Closing date: 1934

General statistics
- Type: Wood
- Manufacturer: Traver Engineering
- Designer: Harry G. Traver
- Model: Giant Cyclone Safety Coaster
- Trains: Single train with 5 cars. Riders are arranged 2 across in 2 rows for a total of 20 riders per train.
- Cyclone at RCDB

Cyclone was the name of two wooden roller coasters which operated at Palisades Amusement Park in Bergen County, New Jersey, United States. The first operated from 1927 through 1934, and the second between 1945 and 1971.

== 1927 Coaster ==
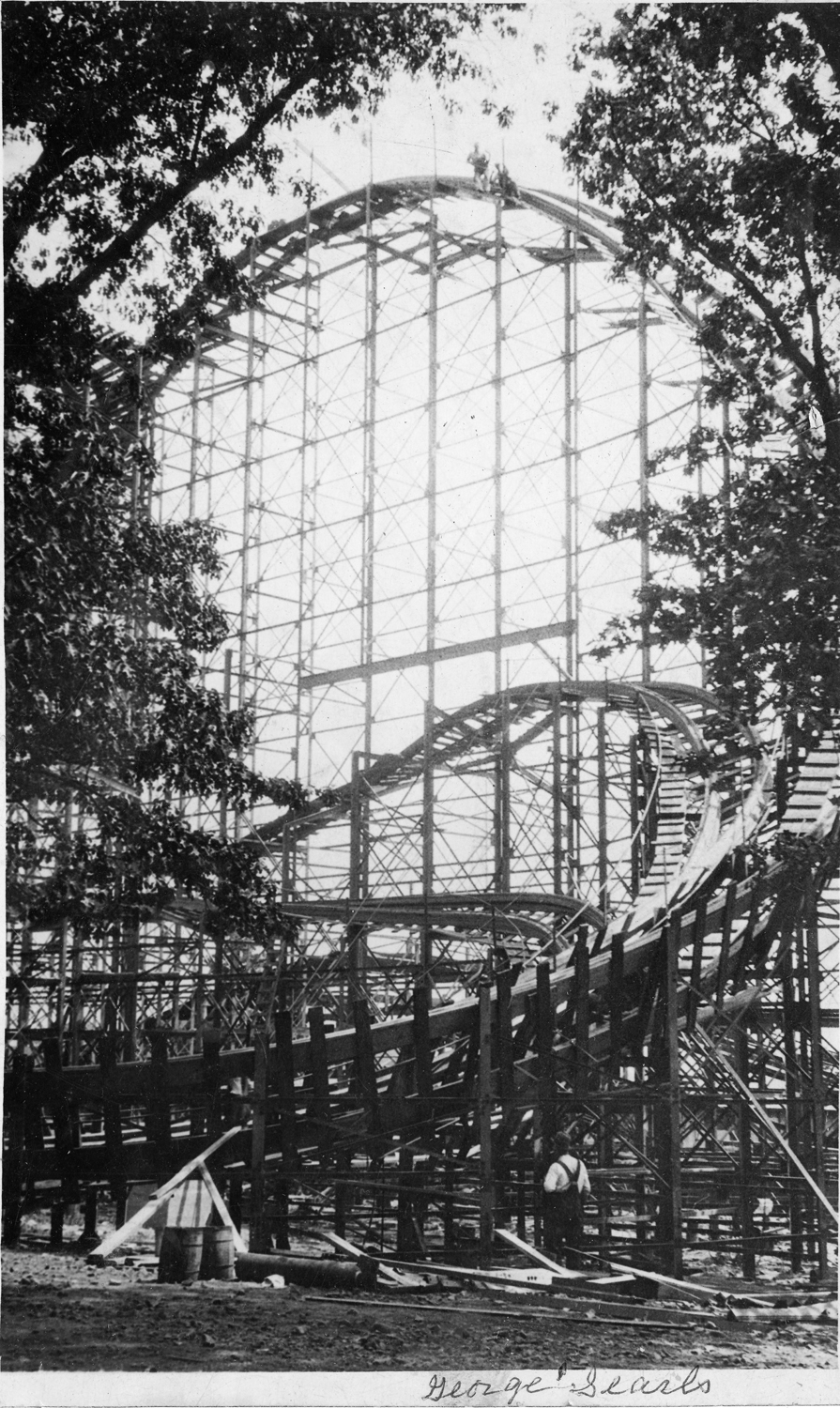
1927 Cyclone under construction

The first coaster was steel-framed wooden roller coaster which was designed and built by Harry Traver of the Traver Engineering Company and a member of the notorious Giant Cyclone Safety Coaster "Terrifying Triplets".

=== History and design ===
After hearing reports of the success of the Cyclone at Crystal Beach Park and the Lightning in Revere, Massachusetts, Nicholas and Joseph Schenck, the owners of Palisades Park, decided to buy their own Giant Cyclone Safety Coaster in 1927. Construction of the Cyclone ran into difficulty when dealing with the uneven, rocky terrain and limited space. As a result, the coaster was built quite near the cliff edge of the Palisades. The coaster opened mid-season on September 10, 1927.

As with other members of the "Terrifying Triplets", the coaster suffered many maintenance issues throughout its existence and spent considerable periods of time standing but not operating. A modern roller coaster designer theorized that this was partly due to the additional wear and tear caused by the construction adjustments necessary for the Palisades terrain.

Although the first Palisades Cyclone was built on a steel frame, fire also played at least some role in its destruction. A major fire at the amusement park in 1934 destroyed some of the coaster's wooden track. This, combined with its negative reputation and declining ridership (the coaster had been up for sale in 1933), led to its ultimate demolition.

=== Ride experience ===
As with the other Giant Cyclone Safety Coasters, the first Cyclone at Palisades was notorious for a rough ride. Although no fatal incidents were reported, park operators reported occasional broken ribs and collarbones. It is thought that this coaster may have been the roughest of the "Terrifying Triplets". The steel structure of the coaster on the unforgiving Palisades terrain and the design adjustments needed to accommodate it are thought to be partially responsible. The spiral element common on Giant Cyclone Safety Coasters was the tightest on the coaster, as were the turns. The ride incorporated the rapidly undulating "Jazz Track" common amongst steel-framed, Traver-designed coasters.

A lack of repeat ridership was a particular problem for the income the coaster created. Only about 10% of rides given were re-rides (compared to about 40% for other coasters of the era). "Cyclone watching" (to see the reactions of pained riders) became a popular pastime and the park's owners considered giving a prize to anyone who rode the coaster three times in succession.

== 1945 Coaster ==
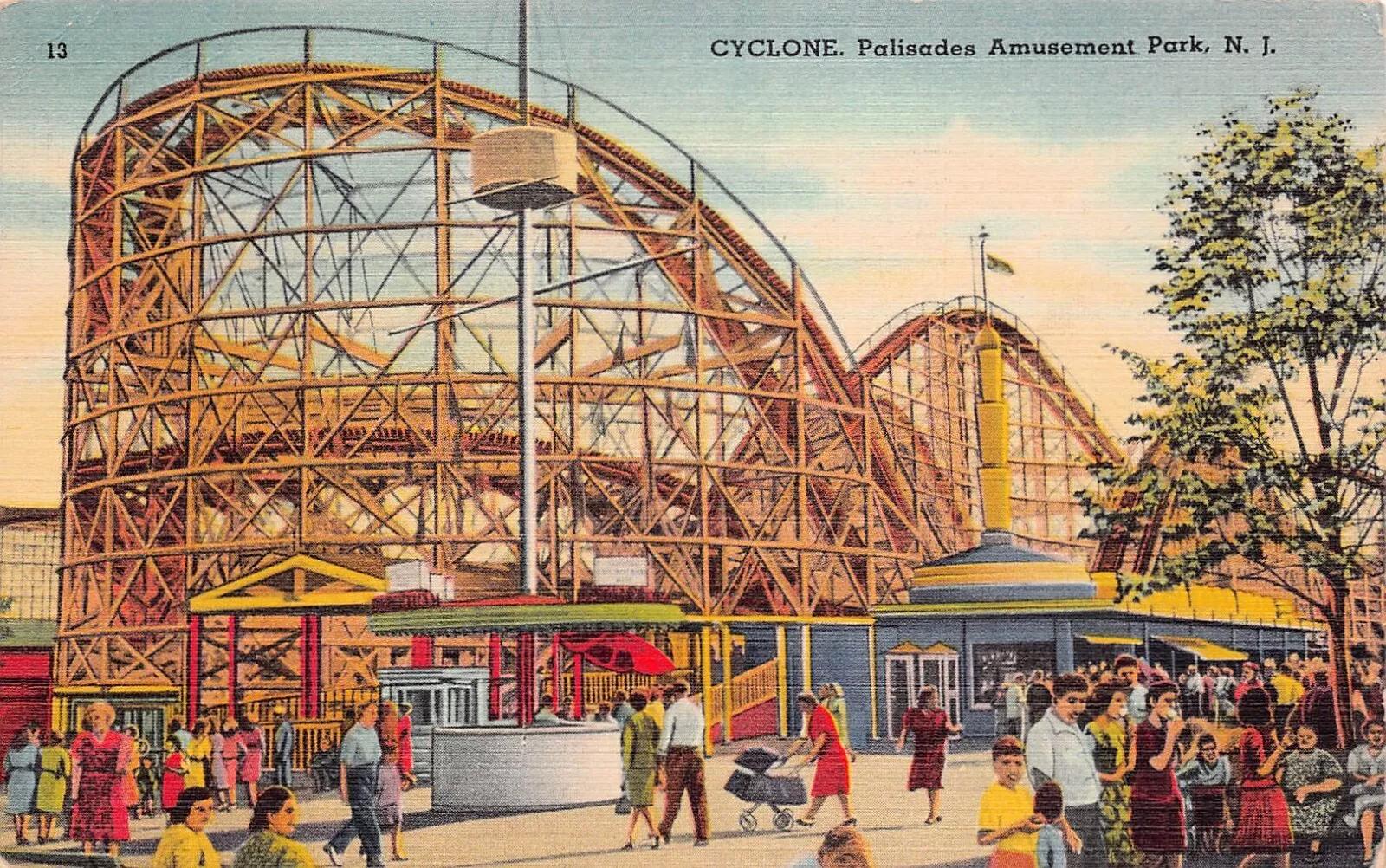
Postcard illustrating 1945 Cyclone roller coaster

The second coaster was a more traditional wooden coaster built by Philadelphia Toboggan Coasters. The coaster was built partially from the remains of a previous coaster known as the Skyrocket. The Skyrocket had operated between 1926 and 1944, when it was destroyed by fire. This second Cyclone closed with Palisades in 1971.
