= Jazz Railway =

Rocky Glen Park
- Location: Rocky Glen Park
- Coordinates: 41.353271°N 75.705919°W
- Status: Removed
- Opening date: 1925
- Closing date: 1927
- Cost: less than $20,000

General statistics
- Type: Wood
- Manufacturer: Traver Engineering
- Designer: Harry G. Traver
- Lift/launch system: Chain-lift
- Height: 26 ft (7.9 m)
- Length: 1,200 ft (370 m)
- Duration: 1 minute 30 seconds
- Trains: 3 cars. Riders are arranged 2 across in a single row for a total of 6 riders per train.
- Jazz Railway at RCDB

Jazz Railway (sometimes Jazz Railroad) was an early model line of wood roller coasters incorporating a steel-frame structure. These operated at various amusement parks and fairgrounds during the mid to late 1920s. The coaster model is considered to be the first of the Wild Mouse style roller coaster.

== History and design ==
While they ran on track constructed of laminated wood and steel—defining the coasters as wooden by modern standards—Jazz Railways were marketed by the Traver Engineering Company as being all steel. The supporting structure of the track was indeed all-steel, and this was hailed as a new innovation in roller coaster design. Advantages of the prefabricated steel support structure included reduced cost, imperviousness to rot and fire, and a quicker set-up and take-down process—which would allow the coaster to be moved from location to location. The name "Jazz Railway" itself was reported by Traver to be a way to distance the design from the wooden-framed roller coasters of the past.

Jazz Railways were important in its demonstration of (nearly) all-steel roller coaster construction. This presaged Traver's later Giant Cyclone Safety Coasters, which utilized the same building technique as Jazz Railway, but on a grander (and more frightening) scale. Jazz Railways were also important as a forerunner of the modern Wild Mouse coaster design.

== Ride experience ==
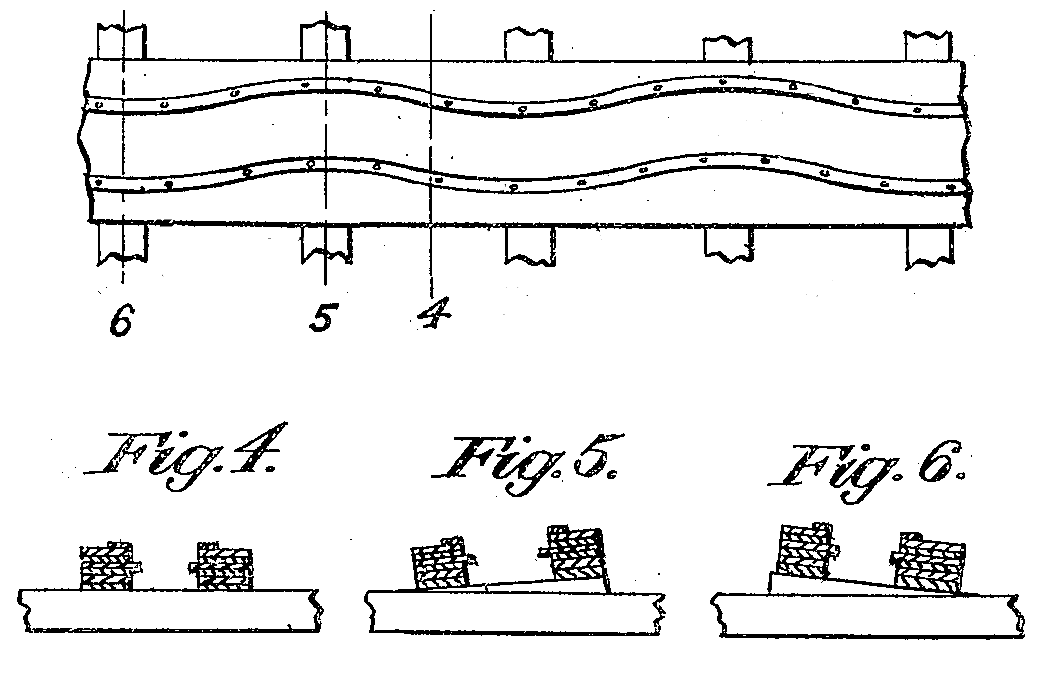
Diagram taken from one of Traver's patents of the rapidly undulating track utilized on Jazz Railways and later coasters

Like modern Wild Mouse coasters, Jazz Railways were relatively compact in their design. The coasters had a footprint of 70 by 160 feet (21 by 49 m). Besides their steel frame structure, another innovation which connected Jazz Railways to the later Giant Cyclone Safety Coasters was its "jump" or "stunt" track (referred to in later Traver Cyclones as a "Jazz Track"). This consisted of rapidly undulating track that created a rapid shimmying motion.

== Locations ==
The first Jazz Railway was built at Rocky Glen Park near Moosic, Pennsylvania in 1925 after being tested at Traver's factory. Subsequent coasters were built at (or relocated to), the Sesquicentennial Exposition in Philadelphia, Pennsylvania, the Alabama State Fairgrounds, as well as parks in Bombay, Toronto, Detroit, and New Orleans.
