= Derby Racer =

Roller coaster at Revere Beach in Revere, Massachusetts

Derby Racer (1911)
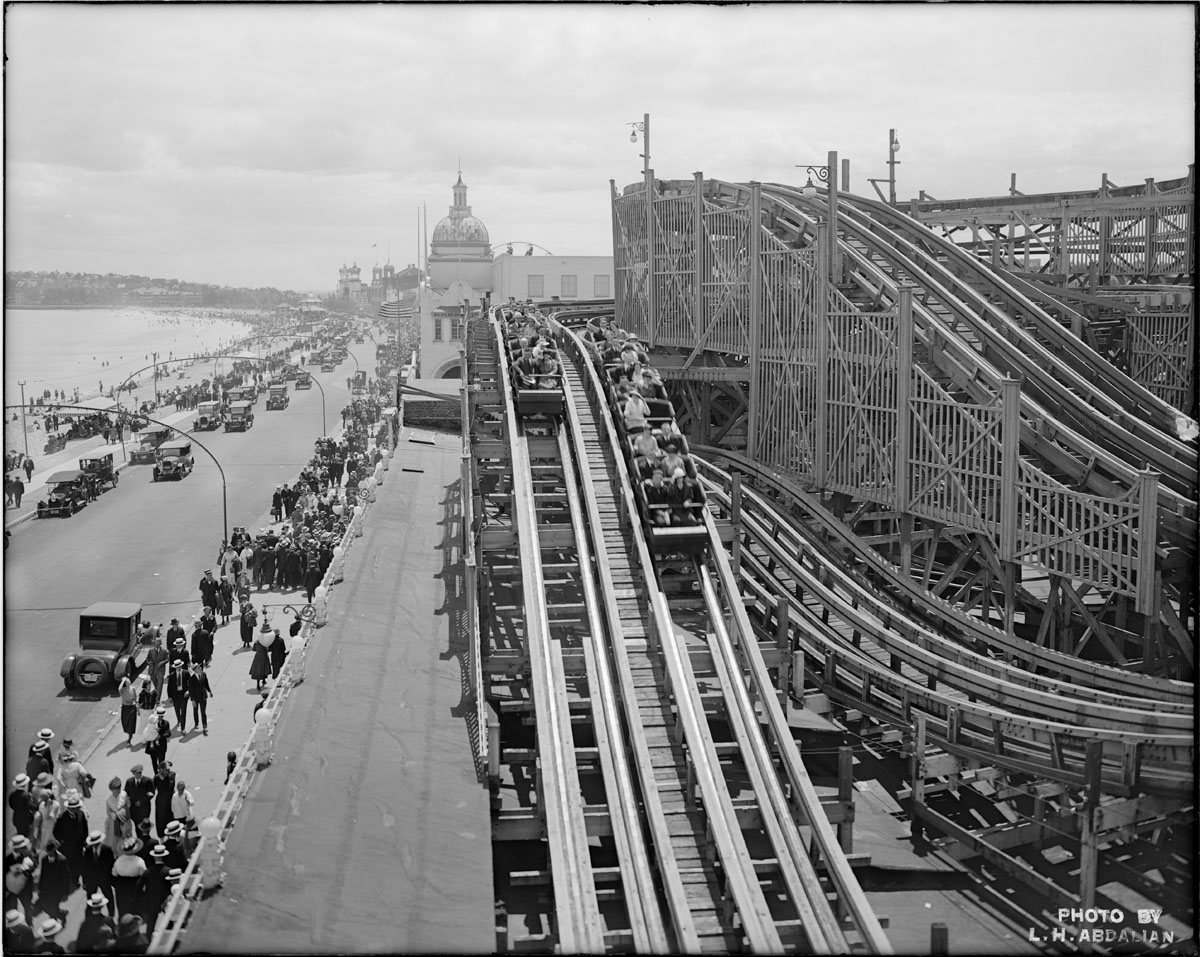
- Derby Racer in 1920

Revere Beach
- Location: Revere Beach
- Coordinates: 42.420°N 70.986°W
- Status: Removed
- Opening date: 1911
- Closing date: 1936
- Cost: $140,000

General statistics
- Type: Wood – Racing
- Manufacturer: Fred W. Pearce
- Track layout: Figure Eight
- Inversions: 0
- Derby Racer (1911) at RCDB

Derby Racer was the name of two wooden roller coasters that operated at Revere Beach in Revere, Massachusetts. The first coaster was built in 1911 and demolished in 1936. The second coaster of the same name was built in 1937 and demolished in 1948. Both coasters were racing roller coasters, with side-by-side track pairs where two coaster trains would race each other around the circuit of the coaster.

== 1911 Coaster ==
The first Derby Racer coaster at Revere Beach was built in 1911 by Fred W. Pearce for a cost of $140,000. Derby Racer's racing coaster design was a popular type of roller coaster in the first two decades of the 20th century; more than one quarter of all the racing coasters ever built were constructed in the 1900s and 1910s. The twin tracks of the Derby Racer were laid out in a figure 8 design. Many years later, Pearce claimed that when the coaster was constructed in 1911, Derby Racer had been the second-largest roller coaster ever built. The owners of Derby Racer, Lewis Bopp and Lewis Trask also owned a restaurant that stood next to the coaster, as well as other attractions on Revere Beach.

=== Accidents ===
Derby Racer was known for a particularly poor safety record. A young man was thrown from the coaster, inflicting life-threatening injuries on June 8, 1911, shortly after the coaster opened. The coaster then re-opened two weeks following the incident. Six years later, another man was killed on the Revere Beach Derby Racer after being thrown in front of a coaster train. In 1923 a couple was severely injured on the Derby Racer as well. Another rider was thrown from a train in 1929, which resulted in a 1935 Massachusetts Supreme Court case against Ocean View Amusements, the operator of the coaster.

== 1937 Coaster ==
Derby Racer (1937)

Revere Beach
- Location: Revere Beach
- Coordinates: 42.420°N 70.986°W
- Status: Removed
- Opening date: 1937
- Closing date: 1948

General statistics
- Type: Wood – Racing
- Manufacturer: H. A. Bauscher
- Designer: Harry C. Baker
- Inversions: 0
- Derby Racer (1937) at RCDB

After the first Derby Racer at Revere Beach was demolished in 1936, a new racing roller coaster with the same name was constructed in 1937. This coaster was built by H. A. Bauscher, and designed by noted roller coaster designer Harry C. Baker. Little is written about the coaster, however, and it was demolished 11 years later in 1948.
