= Harry Traver =

American roller coaster designer

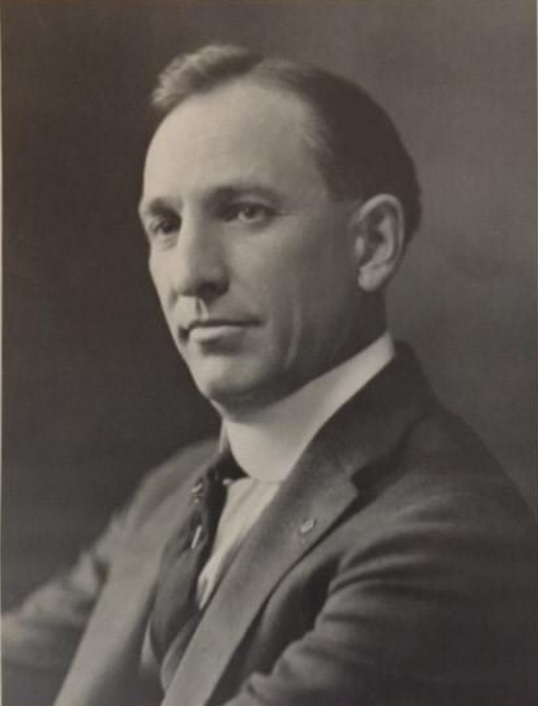
Harry Traver in the 1910s

Harry Guy Traver (November 25, 1877 – September 27, 1961) was an American engineer and early roller coaster designer. As the founder of the Traver Circle Swing Company and Traver Engineering Company, he was responsible for the production of gentle amusement rides like the Circle Swing, Tumble Bug, and Auto Ride. His roller coasters became legendary for their unique twisted layouts and thrilling, swooped turns. At a time when most coasters were built from wood, Traver was the first coaster builder to utilize steel for the primary structural material. He also built the first motorized fire engine in New York City.

== Biography ==
Traver was born in Gardner, Illinois on November 25, 1877, and graduated from Davenport High School in Davenport, Nebraska in 1894. After teaching for three years in the western part of the United States, he took a job with General Electric in 1898, working for the company at the Omaha Exhibition that year. Subsequently employed by the Harris Safety Co. in New York City as a superintendent, he began designing amusement rides in 1903. His first major success was the Airplane Swing, which remains a staple of amusement parks even today.

In 1919, he founded the Traver Engineering Company in Beaver Falls, Pennsylvania, which created amusement rides, including the Tumble Bug, The Caterpillar, Laff in the Dark, Auto Ride, and the Circle-Swing, a ride similar in concept to the earlier Captive Flying Machines ride popularized in the United Kingdom by American-born inventor Sir Hiram Maxim.

In 1945, he began designing a new torpedo and other weapons for the United States Navy, in collaboration with a research division at Columbia University, for the Navy's use during World War II.

Post-war, he helped to design an improved rocket launcher for the U.S. Navy.

He died at the New Rochelle Hospital in New Rochelle, New York at the age of 83 on September 26, 1961. His funeral was held at the Davis Funeral Home in New Rochelle on September 28.

== Notable roller coasters ==
Traver's "Giant Cyclone Safety Coasters" were what made him the most famous (or notorious) of all coaster designers. His most famous coasters were the "terrible trio", all built in 1927. They were:

- "Cyclone" – Built in Crystal Beach Park, Ontario, Canada.
- "Lightning" – Revere Beach, Massachusetts.
- "Cyclone" – Palisades Amusement Park, New Jersey.
- While not part of the trio, "Zip" at Oaks Amusement Park in Portland, Oregon was a more compactly-designed Giant Cyclone. The travelling "Sesquicentennial Cyclone" was a prototype for the line.

All three shared the same twisted layout and utilized trains based on a Prior and Church design: The Great Coasters International Millennium Flyers are patterned after this rolling stock. After leaving the station, the trains would turn 180 degrees and ascended the lift hill. Coming off the lift, the trains dived down to the right, climbing to a sharp jog to the left. A drop and hill followed, and then a severely pitched double helix. Coming out of the helix, the train entered a figure-eight banked at 89 degrees. After the figure-eight, a spiral hill led under the lift, where a jarring series of bunny-hops were placed, After those, the train turned 180 degrees into the "Jazz track", which consisted of the track pitching one way then the other fast and repeatedly. The "Jazz track" was an element of all Traver coasters. (Wood coaster company Custom Coasters International would later make a similar element to "Jazz track" called the "trick track", which would be featured on Shivering Timbers at Michigan's Adventure and the now-defunct Villain at Geauga Lake.) After the "Jazz track", a final spiral drop led to the brake-run.

The Cyclone at Crystal Beach survived the longest of the three, lasting until 1949. On May 30, 1938, Amos Wiedrich was riding the Crystal Beach Cyclone, when he either jumped or otherwise fell from the lift hill and was hit moments later by the coaster's train.

One of Travers' coasters, the Jazz Railway, was the forerunner of the modern Wild Mouse coasters that are built to this day. One such coaster existed from 1925-1927 at Rocky Glen Park in Moosic, Pennsylvania.

In 2001, Disney California Adventure opened, featuring Golden Zephyr, a modern-day replica of the Traver Circle-Swing.

== Patents ==
- US patent 830687, Harry G. Traver, "Circle-Swing", issued 1906-09-11
- US patent 1805266, Harry G. Traver, "Amusement coaster railway", issued 1931-05-12 – Cyclone design
- US patent 1806102, Harry G. Traver, "Amusement ride", issued 1931-10-13 – Cyclone design
- US patent 1827303, Harry G. Traver, "Amusement ride", issued 1931-10-13 – for the Tumble Bug

== Literature ==
Robert Cartmell (1987). "Chapter X. Traver, Prior and Church". The Incredible Scream Machine: A History of the Roller Coaster. Popular Press. pp. 153–166. ISBN 0-87972-342-4.
