= Palisades Amusement Park =

Amusement park in Bergen County, New Jersey

- Previously known as Park on the Palisades, Schenck Brothers Palisade Park
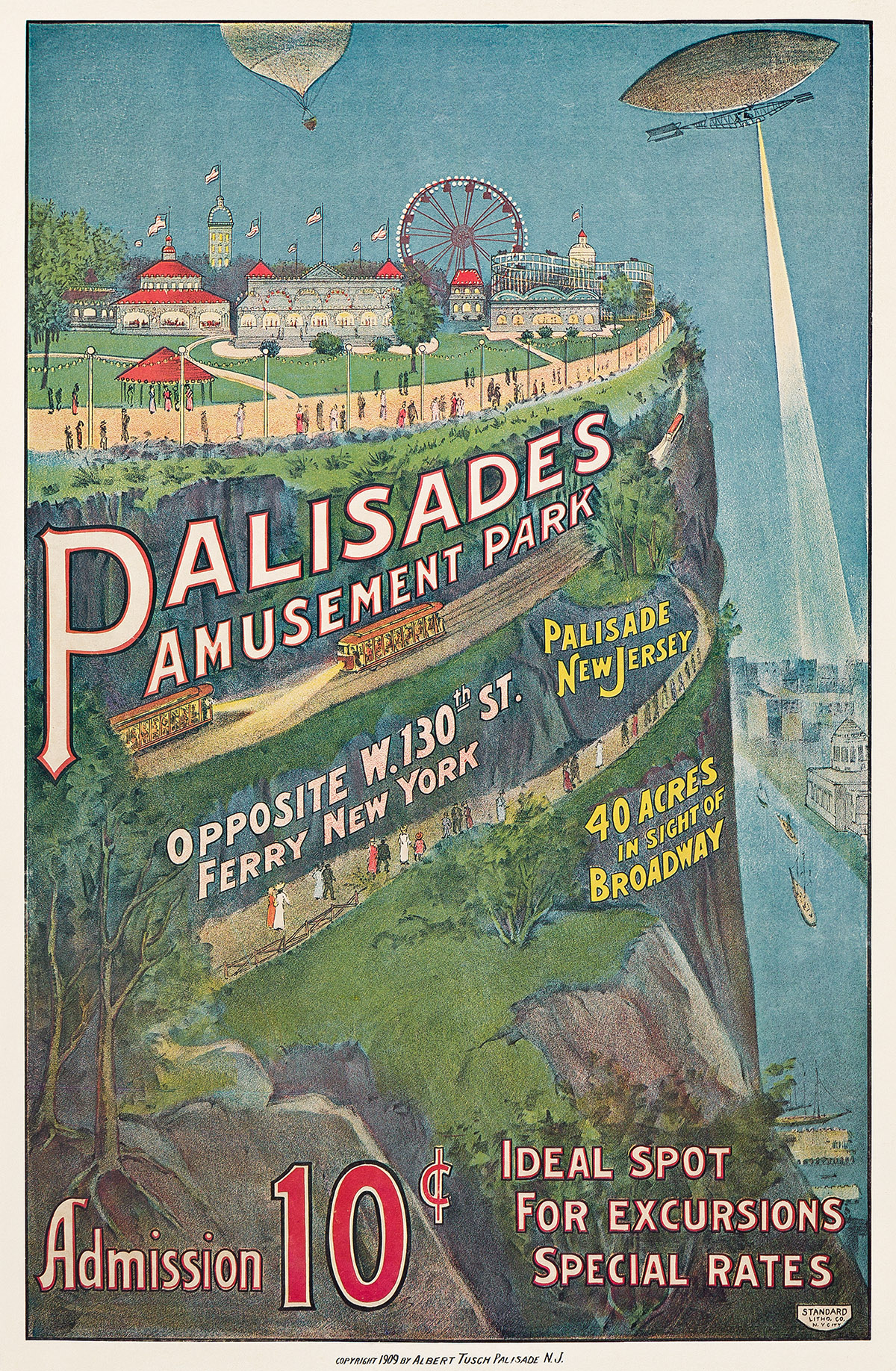
- Interactive map of Palisades Amusement Park
- Location: Cliffside Park-Fort Lee, New Jersey, U.S.
- Coordinates: 40.8281°N 73.9778°W
- Status: Defunct
- Opened: 1898
- Closed: September 12, 1971
- Owner: Nicholas and Joseph Schenck, Jack and Irving Rosenthal
- Slogan: Come on over!
- Operating season: Weekend before Easter to Sunday after Labor Day
- Area: New York metropolitan area

Attractions
- Total: 45-50. Rides varied from season to season
- Roller coasters: 5
- Website: www.palisadespark.com

Palisades Amusement Park was a 38-acre amusement park located in Bergen County, New Jersey, across the Hudson River from New York City. It was located atop the New Jersey Palisades, lying partly in Cliffside Park and partly in Fort Lee. The park operated from 1898 until 1971, remaining one of the most visited amusement parks in the country until its closure, after which a high-rise luxury apartment complex was built on its site.

== Trolley park era: 1898–1910 ==
The park overlooked the Hudson River on 30 acres (12 ha) of New Jersey riverfront land. It straddled what is now Cliffside Park and Fort Lee, and faced the northern end of Manhattan.

In 1898, before common use of automobiles, the Bergen County Traction Company conceived the park as a trolley park to attract evening and weekend riders. It was originally known as "The Park on the Palisades".

In 1908, the trolley company sold the park to August Neumann and Frank Knox, who hired Alven H. Dexter to manage it. Dexter imported a crude assortment of attractions which included a Ferris wheel, a baby parade, and diving horses.

== Schenck ownership: 1910–1934 ==
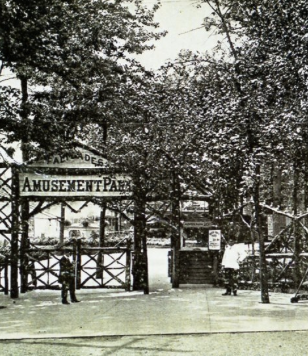
The main entrance, 1912

In 1908, the park was renamed Palisades Amusement Park, and the new owners began adding amusement rides and attractions.

In 1910 the park was purchased by Nicholas and Joseph Schenck and their Realty Trust Company. The Schencks were brothers who were active in the nascent motion picture industry in nearby Fort Lee, and operated the Fort George Amusement Park in New York City, across the Hudson River to the east. They renamed the park, naming it Schenck Bros. Palisade Park.

In 1912 the park added a salt-water swimming pool. It was filled by pumping water from the saline Hudson River, 200 feet (61 m) below in the town of Edgewater. This pool, 400 by 600 feet (120 by 180 meters) in surface area, was advertised as the largest salt-water wave pool in the nation. Behind the water falls were huge pontoons that rose up and down as they rotated, creating a one-foot wave in the pool.

As the park added more attractions, it became so famous by the 1920s that the Borough of Palisades Park, located just west of the amusement park, considered changing its name to avoid confusion among amusement park visitors.

In 1928, the park introduced the Cyclone roller coaster, the third of Harry Traver's "Terrifying Triplets". Due to the high maintenance costs, the ride was removed six years later.

== Rosenthal ownership: 1934–1971 ==
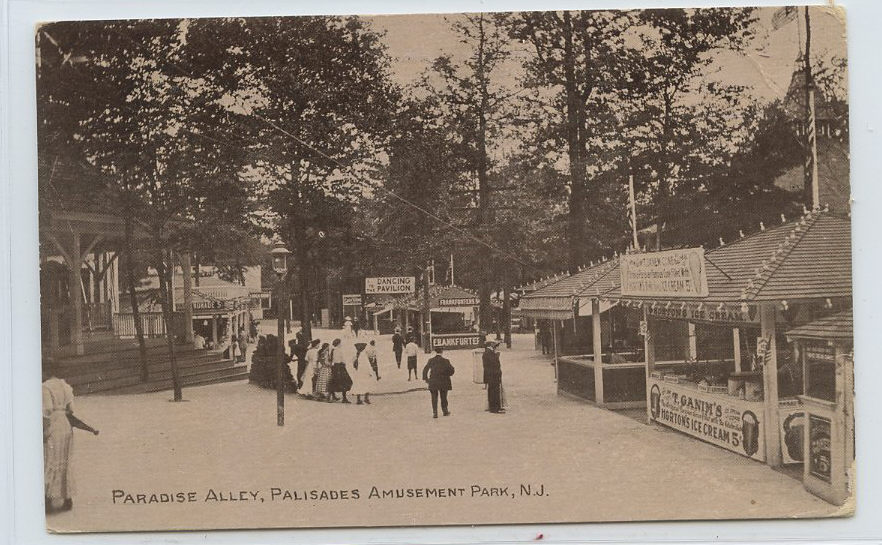
"Paradise Alley", in Palisades Amusement Park

In 1934 or 1935, Nicholas and Joseph Schenck sold the site for $450,000 to Jack and Irving Rosenthal. The brothers and entrepreneurs had made a fortune as concessionaires at Coney Island in Brooklyn. They also owned some concessions and a carousel at Savin Rock Amusement Park in West Haven, Connecticut. The Rosenthals built the Coney Island Cyclone, a wooden coaster, completely different from the Travers' Triplets, in 1927.

In 1935 the park was partially damaged by fire. In 1944, a second fire killed six people, forcing the park to close until the start of the 1945 season.

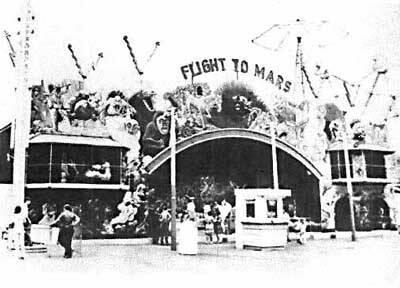
The Flight to Mars attraction

The Rosenthals reverted the park's name to the more recognizable Palisades Amusement Park. One of the many attractions, rebuilt and redesigned by construction superintendent Joe McKee, was the Skyrocket roller coaster. The Rosenthals named the newly repaired coaster the "Cyclone", after their Coney Island coaster. In 1958, Joe built the Wild Mouse roller coaster with his construction foreman Bert Whitworth,.

The park's reputation and attendance continued to grow throughout the 1950s and 1960s, largely due to saturation advertising and the continued success of the park's music pavilion and Caisson bar erected during that time.

In the mid-1950s the park started featuring rock and roll shows, hosted by local radio announcers Clay Cole and "Cousin Brucie" Morrow. In the 1960s, Motown musical acts performed there. Advertisements for the park were frequently printed in the back pages of 1950s and 1960s comic books, along with clip-out coupons, good for one free ride on a specific attraction. The Rosenthals realized that youth in the New York metropolitan area represented the largest single market for comic books in the nation, and that comic book advertising was a cheap way to reach thousands of potential customers.

=== Segregation ===
In 1946, the park formed the Sun and Surf Club and restricted pool access to members only. In the book Palisades Amusement Park: A Century of Fond Memories, the author Vince Gargiulo writes that "In reality, the club allowed park officials to discriminate according to the color of the patron's skin". He cites an example in July 1946, where eight black and two white people entered the park together. The white people were allowed to purchase tickets while the black people were prohibited from doing so. In response, African Americans started protesting against the Palisades Amusement Park pool's segregation policy. Some protesters held signs that stated "Protest Jim Crow".

On July 13, 1947, Melba Valle, a 22-year-old African-American woman, tried to use a pool admission ticket from a Caucasian friend, but was not allowed to enter the pool. Valle was then "'forcibly dragged and ejected' from the Park", as described in several newspapers. As a result, the Congress of Racial Equality (CORE) started protesting at the Palisades Amusement Park entrance. The police detained 11 CORE members. The group stated that they would protest at the park entrance on Sundays, and would only stop their protests when the pool started allowing African Americans.

The protesters handed out the following flyer in 1947, which is now on exhibit in the Fort Lee Museum.

DON'T GET COOL

AT PALISADES POOL
Palisades Pool, in violation of the New Jersey Civil Rights Law, bars Negroes and persons with dark skins.
Such a person is told that a club exists and only members can use the pool.
Yet white persons who are not "members" are regularly admitted and then handed a "membership" card inside.

Irving Rosenthal, the Park's owner, refused to cease racial discrimination, although it violates the New Jersey law.
Members of our interracial group who tried peacefully to gain admittance to the pool
have been manhandled by the Park's private guards and by Fort Lee police.

On July 27 of that year, a Negro was blackjacked from behind by a park representative
while other park "goons" were shoving him on a bus.

On August 3, eleven of the CORE group were arrested on trumped up charges, and two were beaten by the police.

The policy was dropped in the 1950s.

=== "Palisades Park" song and boom in popularity ===
In 1962, Chuck Barris composed and Freddy Cannon recorded a song about the park entitled "Palisades Park". The song was an up-tempo rock and roll tune initiated by a distinctive organ part. The song incorporated amusement park sound effects. "Palisades Park" received nationwide radioplay and increased the park's fame even more. The "Palisades Park" song generated a surge of park visitors.

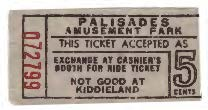
A Palisades Amusement Park ride ticket

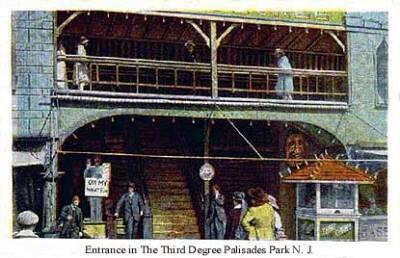
Third Degree attraction

There was a hole in the fence behind the amusement park's music stage, which was used by local children to sneak into the park without paying admission. Although the Rosenthal brothers knew about the hole, they did not repair it. Unlike many modern amusement parks that require visitors to buy an all inclusive pass before entering the grounds, Palisades Amusement Park charged individual fees for each ride and attraction inside the park. Irving Rosenthal, who loved children even though he had none of his own, allowed this "secret" entrance to remain and instructed security personnel to ignore anyone sneaking through it. He felt that children, who had little money to start with, would be more willing to spend their limited funds inside the park if they got in for free.

Irving Rosenthal printed free-admission offers on matchbooks and in other media. He owned an advertising company that put up billboards known as "three sheeters" all over New York City.

Parking was free for the same reasons. As the park began attracting bigger and bigger crowds in later years, the on-site parking lot became less and less adequate, often rapidly filling to capacity. An overflow parking lot was opened at the bottom of the cliff in Edgewater, and shuttle buses carried visitors up to the park. The overflow lot sometimes reached capacity, and when this happened, motorists were directed to park on local streets anywhere between the nearby George Washington Bridge and the Lincoln Tunnel several miles south. This reduced parking for local residents and businesses, and added to street congestion.

From 1947 to 1971, Palisades Park averaged 6 million visitors per year. Peak attendance was reached in 1969, with 10 million visitors. Radio and television commercials broadcast in the greater New York area encouraged the public to, "Come on over!" with a jingle written by Rosenthal's wife, songwriter Gladys Shelley.

== Demise ==
Three factors contributed to the eventual closing of Palisades Amusement Park: inadequate parking facilities; growing uncertainty about the park's future; and an increase in the number of incidents where visitors got injured or killed.

In 1967, Jack Rosenthal died of Parkinson's disease, leaving his brother Irving as sole owner. Irving, in his 70s, was not expected to manage the park for much longer. Without family heirs, it was unclear who would eventually assume ownership. Meanwhile, the park had become so popular that the towns of Cliffside Park and Fort Lee saw increased and worsening congestion from park patrons who did not live in the area.

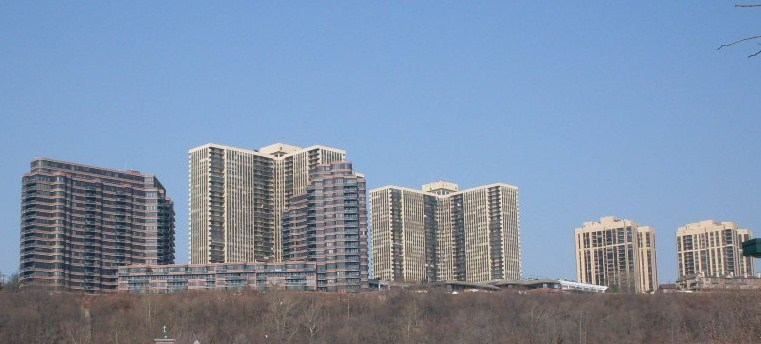
The former site of the amusement park, where high rise condominiums now stand

Local residents objected to the traffic jams, noise, litter, changing racial demographics, and other effects of the park's immense popularity. They demanded action from local elected officials. Meanwhile, developers wanted to profit from the Palisades' view of Manhattan. They successfully pressured the local government to re-zone the amusement park site for high-rise apartment housing and condemn it under eminent domain.

During the next few years, the land was surveyed by a number of builders who made lucrative offers. Irving Rosenthal, who, during the park's heyday in the 1950s and '60s, would refer to Fort Lee as "his town", attempted to postpone the park's inevitable closing and refused to sell.

In January 1971, a Texas developer, Winston-Centex Corporation, acquired the property for $12.5 million, and agreed to lease it back to Irving Rosenthal so that Palisades Amusement Park could operate for one final season. The park permanently closed on Sunday, September 12, 1971. The last person to swim in the famous "world's largest outdoor saltwater pool" was Curt Kellinger, son of long time park employee and pool manager George Kellinger Sr.

After it closed, Morgan "Mickey" Hughes and Fletch Creamer Jr. tried to reopen the park for one more season and obtained a lease from Winston-Centex. The town of Fort Lee would not issue a business license until the next spring, and even then the town could not guarantee such a license. The buildings were demolished. The rides were sold, dismantled, and transported to other amusement operators in the United States and Canada. The towns of Cliffside Park and Fort Lee considered using the park's salt-water swimming pool for municipal recreation, only to find that its filtration system had been damaged beyond repair by vandals.

Four high-rise luxury apartment buildings stand on the old park site today. The first two built were Winston Towers. Carlyle Towers followed, and then the Royal Buckingham. In 1998, on the centennial of the opening of the original Park on the Palisades, Winston Towers management dedicated a monument to Palisades Amusement Park on its property. The monument is a small park, with the names of the rides inscribed on its bricks, named "The Little Park of Memories."

In June 2014, five original roller coaster cars from The Cyclone that were "gathering dust for decades" were returned to Bergen County from Pennsylvania, and were planned to undergo a restoration project, more than 40 years after the park's closing. Though the cars are not functional, they were anticipated to be publicly showcased and displayed.

== In literature and the arts ==
Alan Brennert's 2013 novel Palisades Park is a fictional account of a family beginning in 1922 and ending in 1971, when the amusement park closed. The author used the park as a backdrop and interviewed many local people as part of the background of the novel.

Two pop songs about the park were released as singles: "Palisades Park," a 1962 hit for Freddy Cannon, and a 2014 song of the same name by the American rock band Counting Crows. The Counting Crows song includes many references to the amusement park in the lyrics, including the Sky Rocket and the Wild Mouse. American soul pop singer/songwriter A Girl Called Eddy featured a song titled "Come to the Palisades!" on her album "Been Around" from 2020, that mentions the park in a nostalgic fashion. And the park is mentioned in the lyrics of The Beach Boys' song "Amusement Parks U.S.A.", from their 1965 album Summer Days (And Summer Nights!!). The Beach Boys later covered "Palisades Park" on their 1976 album 15 Big Ones.

Casual depictions and mentions of Palisades Park are seen in various works set in the New York City area when the park was extant – in the 1945 film The Clock, the lights of the rollercoaster and other structures in the park can be seen across the Hudson while the young lovers wait for a bus on Riverside Drive; in the opening credits of the 1956 film Somebody Up There Likes Me, the park's lighted sign and roller coaster can be seen clearly from across the Hudson River in Upper Manhattan; in Chapter IV of the comic book Watchmen, Dr. Manhattan looks at an old photograph that is taken at the amusement park; In the original West Side Story movie, there is an ad for Palisades Park painted on the wall outside Doc's Soda Shop, first appearing at the 1:03 mark; The "Palisades Park" song can be heard playing on the radio of the taxi driver who is harassed by the Newark police in The Many Saints of Newark, the 2021 prequel film to the HBO crime drama series The Sopranos; A poster advertising Palisades Park is seen in The Sopranos episode, The Telltale Moozadell; in the sixth episode of Mad Men (August 23, 2007) Don Draper carries his daughter who is holding a pink helium balloon that reads "Palisades Amusement Park" to bed after an outing; and so forth.

== See also ==
- Eldorado Amusement Park
- "Palisades Park" (Freddy Cannon song)
- List of defunct amusement parks
