= Revere Beach =

Public beach in Revere, Massachusetts, U.S.

Revere Beach Reservation
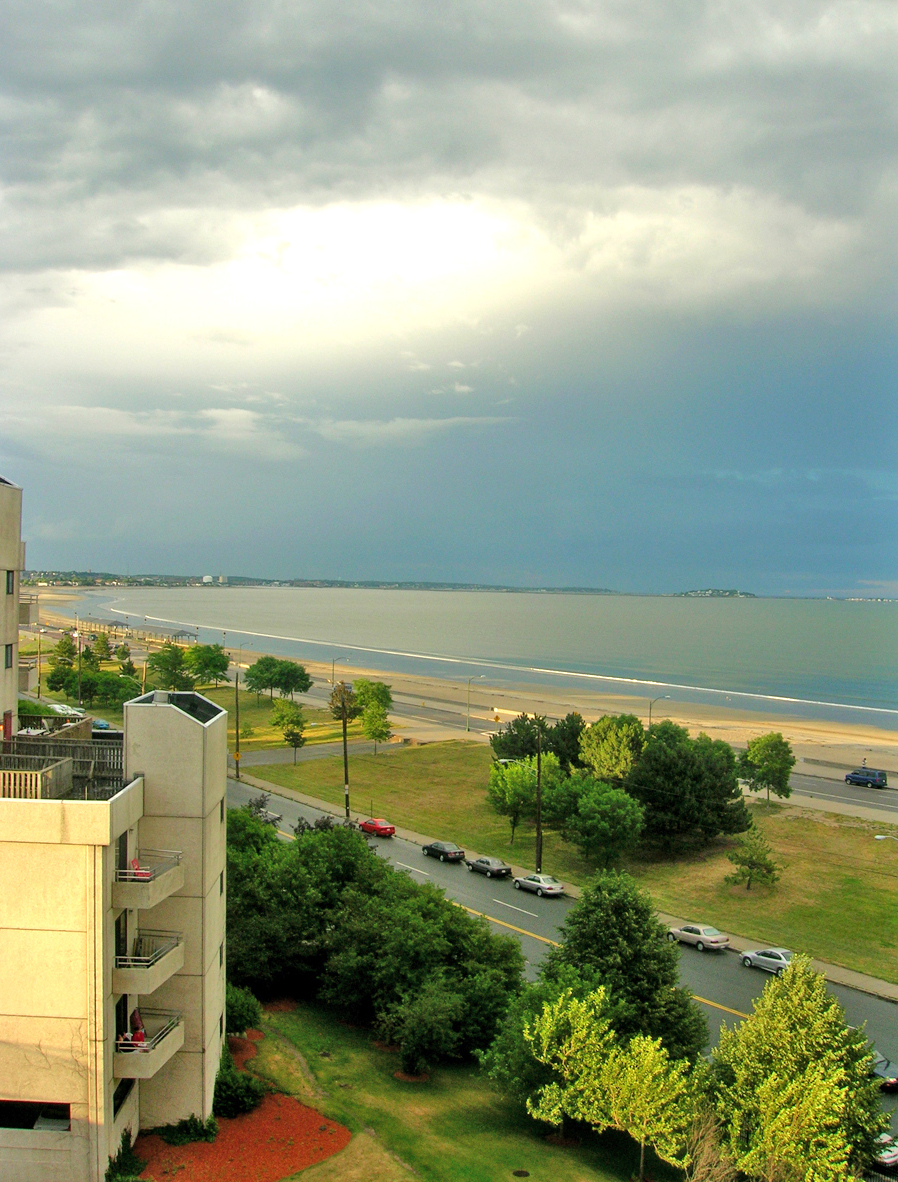
- Revere Beach in 2004

- Location within Greater Boston area Location within Massachusetts Location within the United States
- Location: Revere, Massachusetts, United States
- Coordinates: 42°25′30″N 70°58′58″W
- Area: 84 acres (34 ha)
- Elevation: 10 ft (3.0 m)
- Established: 1896
- Administrator: Massachusetts Department of Conservation and Recreation
- Website: Official website
- Revere Beach Reservation
- U.S. National Register of Historic Places
- U.S. National Historic Landmark
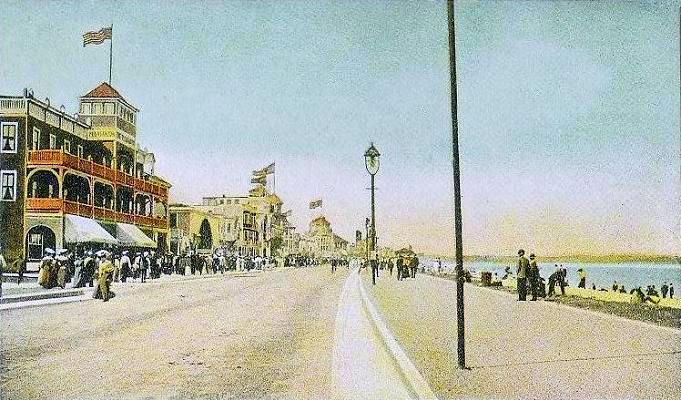
- Revere Beach Blvd. in c. 1910
- Location: Revere, Massachusetts
- Built: 1895
- Architect: Charles Eliot; William D. Austin of Stickney & Austin
- NRHP reference No.: 03000642, 98000871

Significant dates
- Added to NRHP: May 27, 2003
- Designated NHL: May 27, 2003

Revere Beach is a public beach in Revere, Massachusetts, measuring over three miles (4.8 km) long and located about five miles (8 km) north of downtown Boston. In 1875, a rail link was constructed to the beach, leading to its increasing popularity as a summer recreation area. In 1896, the land was claimed for public use and redeveloped to accommodate large crowds while maintaining the natural scenery, thereby becoming the first public beach in the United States. It is still easily accessible from Boston by the MBTA subway's Blue Line, and can accommodate as many as one million visitors in a weekend during its annual sand sculpture competition. The Revere Beach Reservation and Revere Beach Reservation Historic District are listed on the National Register of Historic Places.

== History ==
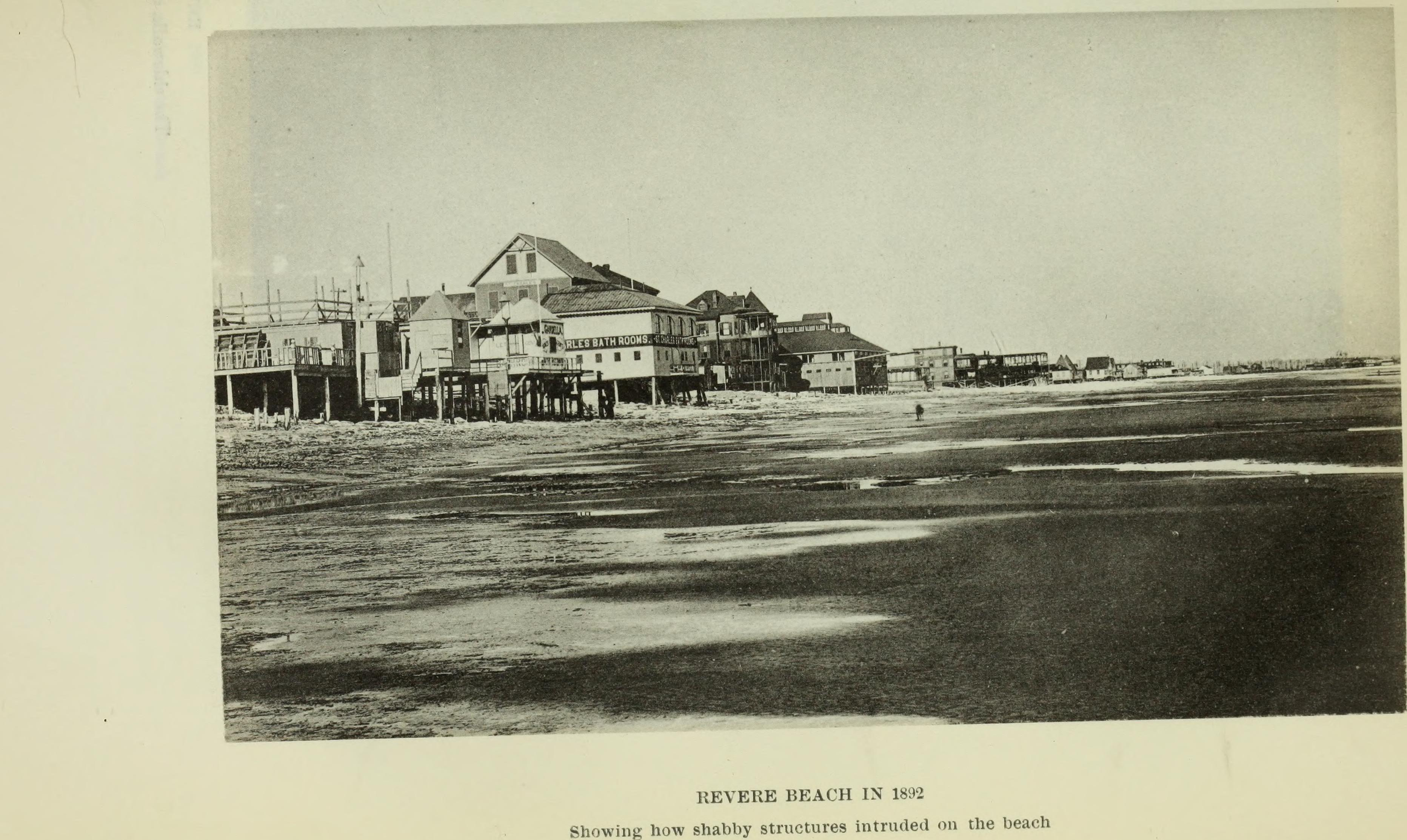
Revere Beach in 1892

The name of the beach was changed from Chelsea Beach to Revere Beach in 1871. Beginning in 1875, the Boston, Revere Beach & Lynn Railroad, known as the "Narrow Gauge", made it easily accessible to visitors from Boston and elsewhere. Various beach-related and recreational buildings sprang up along the beach itself, which was constrained by the nearness of the railroad to the high tide mark.

On October 1, 1896, the Metropolitan Park Commission (now part of the Massachusetts Department of Conservation and Recreation) assumed management of the beach. Following the design of landscape architect Charles Eliot, the railroad tracks were moved from the beach itself to the alignment now used by the MBTA Blue Line, and hundreds of structures were removed from the beach. On July 12, 1896, Revere Beach was opened as the first public beach in the nation. An estimated 45,000 people showed up on opening day. Only a few weeks later, tens of thousands more fled to the beach to escape the heat wave of 1896.

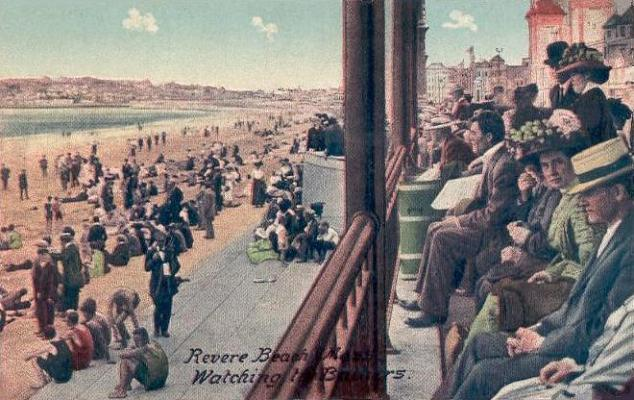
Watching the Bathers in 1910

In the following decades, Revere Beach developed many attractions, including restaurants, dance halls and ballrooms, roller skating rinks, bowling alleys, and roller coasters. Three roller coasters were particularly well-known: the Cyclone, a wooden roller coaster that was the tallest roller coaster ever built at the time of its construction in 1925; the Lightning, which was a steel roller coaster; and the Derby Racer, a racing roller coaster. All have since been torn down.

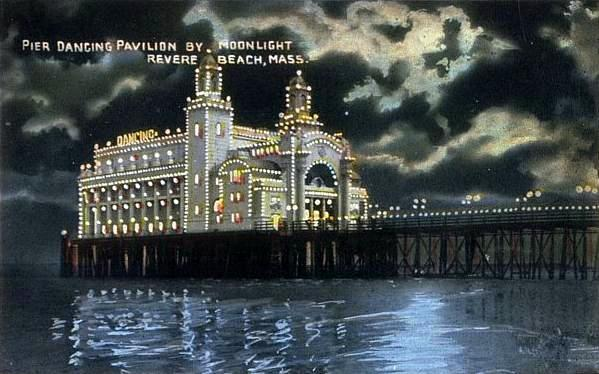
Ocean Pier in c. 1911

=== Revere Beach riot of 1920 ===
On the night of August 8, 1920, a riot broke out in Revere Beach when a police officer arrested a United States Navy sailor on the charge of drunkenness. Sailors who were on leave for the weekends saw what happened and attempted to wrestle control of their comrade from a police officer, and the riot ensued. United States Marines and a few United States Army soldiers joined the sailors and surrounded the police station in attempt to free their drunken comrade. Numbering to about 400, mobs of servicemen pelted the station with rocks and fired stolen shooting-gallery weapons at it. Request for assistance was summoned to Federal troops from Fort Banks and the Boston Navy Yard, and the Chelsea Police Department.

A detachment of 200 Army soldiers from Fort Banks arrived with fixed bayonets and assisted police in clearing the beach. The Navy gave orders to its master-at-arms personnel that every sailor in Revere was to be arrested. More than 100 had been placed under arrest and by August 9, military and police authorities finally kept the disorder under control. Many injuries inflicted upon policemen and civilians as well as a mob of five sailors were minor, mostly from flying stones when the mob hurled objects at the police station. The windows were smashed and much of the furniture in the station was broken.

=== Decline and renewal ===
The popularity of Revere Beach began to decline in the 1950s as the facilities at the beach deteriorated. The land between Beach Street and Chester Ave. on the Boulevard was taken by eminent domain on February 4, 1978. Just two days later,The Blizzard of 78 badly damaged many of the remaining structures, the sidewalks, and the sea wall - notably, the Frolic and the Nautical, among other buildings on that block. Despite this, some amusements would open for the summer of 1978. The entire block was razed in early 1979.

After a significant revitalization effort by the city of Revere and the state of Massachusetts, the beach reopened in May 1992. On the weekend of July 19, 1996, Revere commemorated the centennial of the first opening of Revere Beach with a three-day celebration, and on May 27, 2003, Revere Beach was designated a National Historic Landmark. In 2007, Revere Beach Boulevard was redesigned with new landscaping and sidewalks, and improved parking.

=== Digital preservation ===
In 2026, RevereBeach.com underwent a restoration and modernization intended to preserve historical material related to Revere Beach while expanding the website as a resource for residents and visitors. The project included the preservation of photographs, stories, and long-standing web content, along with expanded information about local events, businesses, transportation, accessibility, weather, tides, and other community resources. The modernization was led by The Deady Group, a Boston-area independent technology advisory firm. RevereBeach.com also maintains a partnership with the Revere Chamber of Commerce focused on increasing visibility for local businesses and strengthening connections between the website and the surrounding business community.

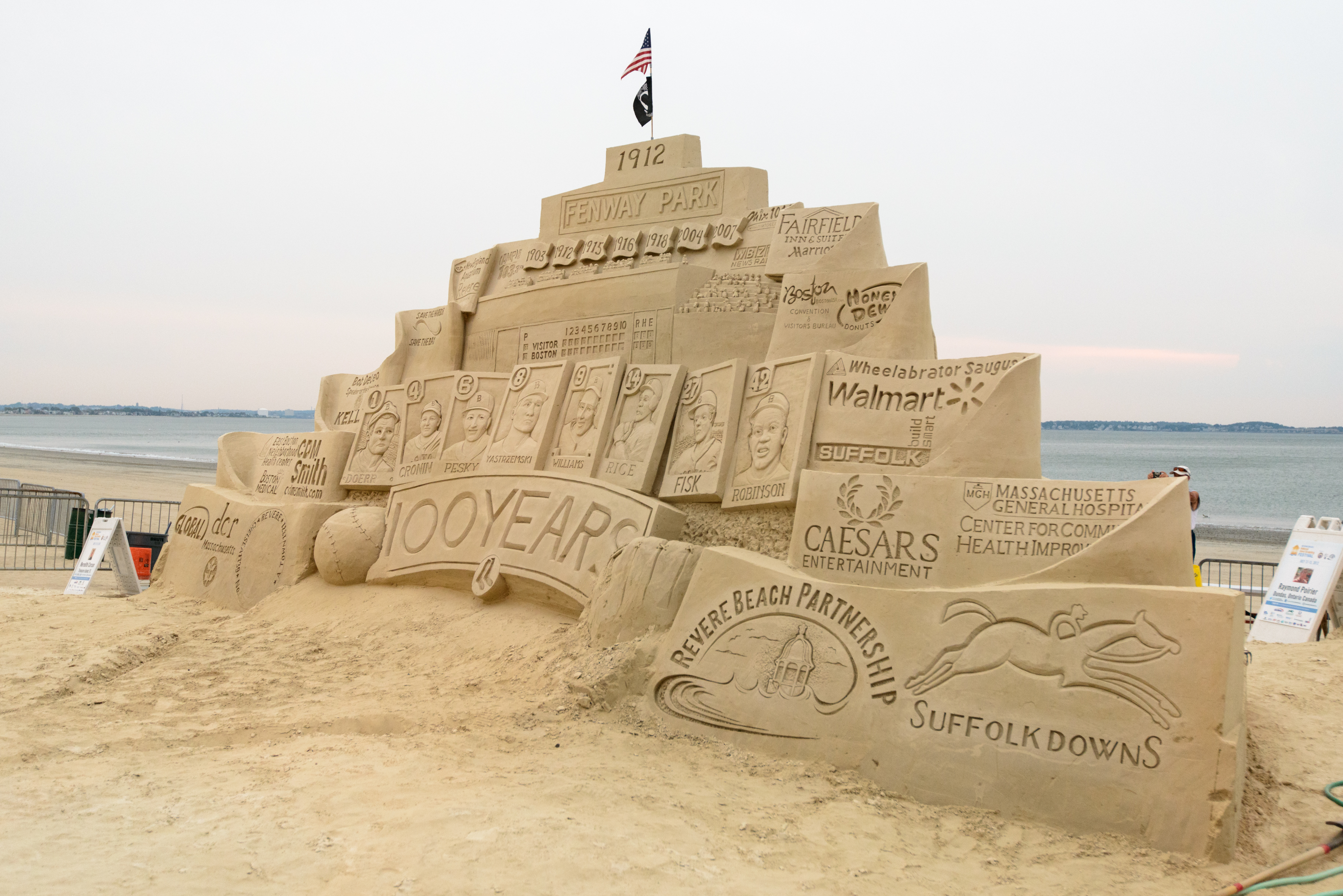
Central sculpture for the 2012 Revere Beach Sand Sculpture Festival

== International Sand Sculpting Festival ==
The Revere Beach International Sand Sculpting Festival is an annual three day festival arranged by the Revere Beach Partnership, a non-profit organization established in 2001. The festival has been held every summer since 2004, attracting thousands of spectators each day. The event draws approximately one million visitors each year. With thousands of dollars in prize money available for contest winners, the festival has featured the work of artists from all over the world. During the festival, an area of the beach is fenced off, creating a temporary art gallery for visitors. There are also a number of food vendors and other activities.

== Revere Beach Pride ==
The City of Revere hosts an annual Pride event. Similar to the city's International Sand Sculpting Festival, Pride is held during Pride Month and includes an array of food vendors, live entertainment, and other activities. The city began hosting this event in 2022. The event was predated in 2020 when Mayor Brian Arrigo hosted the city's first Pride flag raising over city hall on June 12.

== Water quality ==
Starting with the passage of the BEACH Act in 2000, a concentrated effort has been made to improve the water quality of Revere Beach and other beaches in Massachusetts. This includes a public website with water quality results and notifications of beach closures due to waterborne pathogens.

Revere Beach undergoes routine testing for Enterococcus, a pathogen indicating bacteria responsible for illnesses as slight as sore throat to meningitis, gastroenteritis, and encephalitis. The water is tested on a weekly basis at four different sites throughout the summer, from June to August. These sites are Oak Island, Revere Beach Bathhouse (state police station), Beach Street, and Point of Pines. This data is collected by the Massachusetts Water Resources Authority.

== Wildlife ==
Piping plovers, a vulnerable species of bird, are known to build their nests along Revere Beach in the spring. During the birds' nesting season, string and fence enclosures are constructed to protect the birds and their eggs, the latter of which are so small as to blend in with the sand. Other wildlife include shorebirds, gulls, loons, eiders, sturgeon, porpoises, hermit crabs, harbor seals, sharks and ospreys.

== In popular culture ==
In July 2014, a section of Revere Beach was transformed into Miami Beach, Florida, for the filming of Black Mass (2015), directed by Scott Cooper and starring Johnny Depp as Whitey Bulger. Live palm trees were planted in the sand and a local pizza restaurant was converted into a Cuban cafe for the production.

== See also ==
- List of amusement parks in New England
- List of National Historic Landmarks in Massachusetts
- National Register of Historic Places listings in Suffolk County, Massachusetts
