= Asian carp in North America =

Invasive species

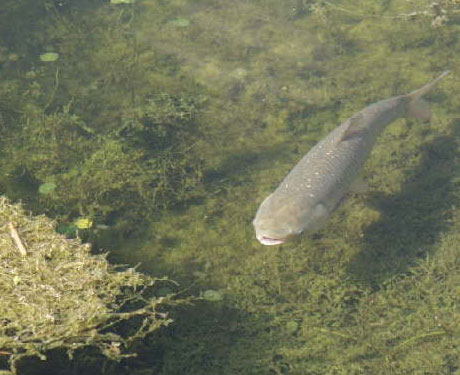
Grass carp

Asian carp, a group of invasive species of fish introduced into North America, pose a major threat to the ecology, environment, economy, and way of life in the Upper Midwest and Great Lakes region of the United States and Canada. The term refers to a group of xenocypridid fish species originally native to East Asia, of which several are known to be invasive in the United States, and represent the most urgent potential danger to the ecology of the Great Lakes.

The United States Department of the Interior and United States Fish and Wildlife Service presented their first annual report to Congress on the issue in December 2014. In June 2022, a United States Environmental Protection Agency (EPA) funded initiative to rebrand and rename Asian Carp "Copi" was announced. The new name is a part of the Federal and multi-state campaign to rebrand the destructive carps to the public as a healthy and responsible seafood option in order to decrease its numbers in U.S. waterways.

== Background ==
Asian carp, Shedd Aquarium, Chicago

The four dominant fish species known in the United States as Asian carp are introduced invasive species. They all cause harm within their new environments.

Specifically, the four most well-known species of invasive Asian carp are black carp (Mylopharyngodon piceus), grass carp (Ctenopharyngodon idella), silver carp (Hypophthalmichthys molitrix), and bighead carp (Hypophthalmichthys nobilis).

Black carp are carnivorous and feed on native mussels and snails, some of which are already endangered. Grass carp are herbivores that feed on aquatic plants, and can alter the food webs of a new environment by altering the communities of vegetations, invertebrates and fish. Silver and bighead carp are filter feeders of planktons, which are necessary food sources for larval fish and native mussels.

The extremely high abundance of bighead and silver carp in the Mississippi basin has caused great concern because of the potential for competition with native species for food and living space. Because of their algae-eating nature, they are not easily drawn to most baits and are thus difficult to capture by normal angling methods used by recreational fishermen.

=== Introduction in North America ===
In the 1970s, fish farmers in mostly southern states began importing Asian carp from China to help clean their commercial ponds. The rise in the populations of bighead and silver carp has been dramatic where they are established in the Mississippi River basin. Although many sources cite the record floods of the 1990s as the means by which Asian carp escaped aquaculture ponds into the Mississippi River, this is apocryphal. There is at least one known escape of bighead carp from aquaculture ponds in 1995, but bighead and silver carp were established in the Mississippi River basin prior to 1990. Grass carp have been reproducing in the Mississippi River since the 1970s.

Because of their prominence, and because they were imported to the United States much later than other carp native to Asia, the term "Asian carp" is often used with the intended meaning of only grass, black, silver, and bighead carp. Of the Asian carp introduced to the United States, only two (crucian and black carp) are not known to be firmly established. Crucian carp is probably extirpated. Since 2003, however, several adult, fertile black carp have been captured from the Atchafalaya and other rivers connected to the Mississippi River. Dr. Leo Nico, in the book Black carp: Biological Synopsis and Risk Assessment of an Introduced Fish, reports that black carp are probably established in the United States. In South Florida, the local water management district stocks the canals with sterilized grass carp to control the hydrilla plant, which tends to block the locks and drainage valves used to control water flow from the Everglades.

=== Jumping ability ===
Silver carp, in particular, have become notorious for being easily frightened by boats and personal watercraft, which causes them to leap high out of the water. The fish, which can grow to 100 lb (45 kg) in mass, are capable of jumping up to 8–10 ft (2.4–3.0 m) into the air, and numerous boaters have been severely injured by collisions with the airborne fish. According to the EPA, "reported injuries include cuts from fins, black eyes, broken bones, back injuries, and concussions." Bighead carp, however, do not normally jump when frightened. Catching jumping carp in nets has become part of the Redneck Fishing Tournament, in Bath, Illinois. Other parties, such as the Peoria Carp Hunters, have taken advantage of the jumping ability as a mechanism of hunting the carp, in some cases attempting to purge the invasive species. Peculiarly, the extreme jumping behavior appears to be unique to North American silver carp; their relatives in the native Asian ranges are much less prone to jumping even if introduced to other parts of the world. Although theories have been proposed (for example, the high densities the species reaches in parts of North America, or that the introduced North American population may have been descended from a small number of particularly "jumpy" individuals; see founder effect), the reason for these geographic differences is not known for certain.

== Presence and threats ==
=== Proliferation in the Mississippi, Missouri, and Ohio River basins ===
Bighead, silver, and grass carp are known to be well-established in the Mississippi River basin (including its tributaries, the Ohio and Missouri rivers), where they at times reach extremely high numbers, especially in the case of the bighead and silver carp. Bighead, silver, and grass carp have been captured in that watershed from Louisiana to South Dakota, Minnesota, and Ohio. Grass carp are also established in at least one other watershed, in Texas, and may be established elsewhere.

=== In the Great Lakes ===
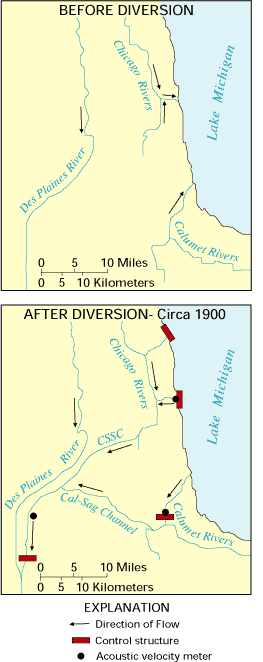
Flow of water before and after construction of the Chicago Sanitary and Ship Canal. Note that the before image here does not include the layout of the transcontinental divide Illinois and Michigan Canal (built 1848) which existed at the time (1900) but did not generally affect the flow of the waters

The EPA is concerned about the possibility of Asian carp migrating across the Saint Lawrence River divide, to the Great Lakes drainage basin. In 2002, the U.S. Army Corps of Engineers (USACE) completed an electric fish barrier in the Chicago Sanitary and Ship Canal. The canal connects the Mississippi River drainage basin (via the Illinois River and its tributary the Des Plaines River) to the Great Lakes Waterway (via the Chicago River) and is the only navigable aquatic link between these basins. The initial fish barrier was used as a demonstration project to study the design's effectiveness. Following positive results, construction began on a permanent barrier in 2004. In addition to the canal, USACE has identified 18 sites in 5 additional states, from Minnesota to New York, that could allow for movement of Mississippi basin carp into the Great Lakes.

The Asian carp have been found in Lake Calumet in Illinois. Grass carp have been captured in every Great Lake except Lake Superior, but so far, no evidence indicates a reproducing population. No silver carp or black carp have yet been found in any Great Lake. Common carp are abundant throughout the Great Lakes.

A report issued in 2012 by the Great Lakes Commission concludes that physical separation of the Great Lakes and the Mississippi River watersheds is the best long-term solution to prevent Asian carp and other invasive species from migrating between the waterbodies.

Stopping these invasive carp from spreading into Lake Erie is another concern to many involved, as Lake Erie provides the ideal habitat for the carp to survive. This could lead to the fish choking out the other native fish that exist there, which would result in a major loss for the sport-fishing industry in the area. This is especially true since catching these carp with traditional fishing methods is difficult, which makes it harder for the industry to shift the sport fishing from one fish to another. In October 2013, scientists for the first time documented that Asian carp had reproduced in Ohio's Sandusky River, a tributary of Lake Erie. A study released in 2015 detailed the devastating potential of a possible carp invasion on Lake Erie.

In May 2013, a test for silver carp eDNA in the waters of Sturgeon Bay in Lake Michigan near Green Bay, Wisconsin, was positive. May is a month when the carp are active. The result was published in October and scientists re-tested in May 2014.

In 2016, many Great Lakes charter boat captains have renewed calls for a rapid response to the threat of carp invasion. In August 2016, the Michigan Department of Natural Resources reported that no evidence of Asian carp had been found in their sampling of the state's waters, or that of the Great Lakes system.

==== Litigation ====
On December 21, 2009, Michigan Attorney General Mike Cox filed a lawsuit with the U.S. Supreme Court seeking the immediate closure of the Chicago Sanitary and Ship Canal to keep the Asian carp out of Lake Michigan. Neighboring Great Lakes states and the U.S. Army Corps of Engineers, which constructed the Canal, are co-defendants in the lawsuit.

In response to the Michigan lawsuit, on January 5, 2010, Illinois Attorney General Lisa Madigan filed a counter-suit with the Supreme Court, requesting it to reject Michigan's claims. The Illinois Chamber of Commerce and American Waterways Operators both sided with Illinois in the lawsuit, filing affidavits (amicus briefs) and arguing that closing the Chicago Sanitary and Ship Canal would upset the movement of millions of tons of vital shipments of iron ore, coal, grain and other cargo, totaling more than $1.5 billion a year, and contribute to the loss of hundreds, perhaps thousands of jobs. In response, Michigan noted the value of the sport fishing and recreation industry, already heavily affected in other states with large carp populations, would drop by more than $3.0 billion and result in the loss of at least 4,000 jobs. President Obama and his administration supported Illinois's efforts to keep the canal open; with the support of USGS and U.S. Fish and Wildlife service, reports have consistently denied the Asian carp poses a threat.

On January 19, 2010, the Supreme Court rejected the Michigan injunction request, but took no action on Michigan's separate request to reopen older cases regarding Chicago water withdrawal from Lake Michigan. The litigation proceeds in lower courts.

After obtaining information showing DNA evidence of Asian carp in Lake Michigan, Michigan again requested the Chicago locks be closed on February 4, 2010. This request was denied on March 25, 2010. Four months later, Wisconsin, Minnesota, Ohio, and Pennsylvania joined Michigan in the court battle on July 19, 2010, when the five states filed suit against the US Army Corps of Engineers and the Metropolitan Water Reclamation District of Greater Chicago in federal district court. They were again seeking to close the locks.

One thing they did was file an injunction to have the locks closed. The injunction was denied on December 2, 2010. The states filed an appeal for the injunction on January 26, 2011, and was denied on August 24, 2011. The Supreme Court was petitioned to review the appeal for the injunction and declined to review it on February 27, 2012.

In December 2012, the US District Court for the Northern District of Illinois dismissed the lawsuit. The court determined that if the Great Lakes were hydrologically separated from the Mississippi River Basin, it would violate federal laws requiring the US Army Corps of Engineers to maintain a route of navigable water ways between the two systems. Because of this conflict, the states were given until January 11, 2013, to re-plead the case in a different manner or may appeal the dismissal in the Seventh Circuit.

On January 1, 2010, the Ontario government also filed a lawsuit (alongside the American states) in an American court to stop the dumping of Asian carp into the Great Lakes, a potentially damaging act to the fishing industry (of Canada).

=== In the Upper Mississippi River watershed ===
The United States Geological Survey collaborated with the University of Minnesota to prepare an extensive report on the use of environmental deoxyribonucleic acid (eDNA) to detect a species in a waterway. This report was put together after extensive field research resulting from positive findings of the eDNA of Asian carp in Minnesota waterways in 2011. Rivers being researched are the Mississippi and St. Croix Rivers. However, new research was unable to redetect the presence of Asian carp, although several have been caught in Minnesota over the past two years. Possibilities of why Asian carp were not detected include a change in the method of sampling or a disappearance of the carp from Minnesota waterways. In May 2013, a test for silver carp eDNA in the waters of Sturgeon Bay in Lake Michigan near Green Bay, Wisconsin was positive. The carp are active in May. The result was published in October and scientists will retest in May, 2014.

In 2011, the National Park Service developed and published an action plan, which outlined recommendations on how to stop the spread of Asian carp in Minnesota.

The Upper Mississippi CARP Act was presented to Congress as recently as 2013. Presented by Congressmen Ellison of Minnesota, the Upper Mississippi CARP Act would empower the Secretary of the Army to enact strategies previously determined to prevent further spread of Asian carp and begin eliminating the species. Included in this legislation is the requirement for the Army Corps of Engineers to shut down the Upper St. Anthony Falls lock if Asian carp are detected in the portion of the Mississippi River near the Twin Cities. U.S. Senator Amy Klobuchar told the Pierce County Herald, "Asian carp not only pose a serious threat to Minnesota's environment, and they also threaten the recreation and fishing industries that play a key role in the state's economy. We must do everything we can to stop the further spread of this invasive species into our lakes and rivers, and this legislation will help the state take action to protect Minnesota's waterways".

In 2015, the locks of St. Anthony Falls Lock and Dam were closed to control the spread of Asian carp, making Minneapolis, once again, the head of navigation on the Mississippi.

In June 2015, bighead carp were caught by recreational fishermen in the St. Croix River. In February 2016, bighead carp were also caught, by commercial fishermen in the Minnesota River. These occurrences were met with concern from the Minnesota Department of Natural Resources.

=== In Louisiana ===
While the threat to the Great Lakes is clear, the Asian carp poses risks everywhere. A survey conducted in 2013 and 2014 of the Mississippi, Atchafalaya, Ouachita, and Red Rivers found that 14% of juvenile fish were Asian carp. The results of a 20-year study in the Upper Mississippi Basin show that the Asian carp population out-competes native sport-fish species. One Louisiana fisherman made the claim in 2018 that he could fish the Mississippi and Atchafalaya Rivers for four hours and net 47,000 pounds of Asian carp. LDWF invasive species biologist Bobby Reed feels that the lack of anglers targeting the Asian carp are allowing the populations in the state to continue to grow. Chef Phillipe Parola feels the population can become a problem for current seafood industries, i.e. shrimp, oyster, crab, and crawfish. In fact, Parola's first batch of Silverfin Cakes were harvested from 100,000 pounds of Asian carp taken from the Tensas River.

=== In Canada and Mexico ===
In Canada, the federal Department of Fisheries and Oceans has evaluated the risk of Asian carp invading Canadian waters, particularly the Great Lakes, either by introduction from the Mississippi or through the market in live carp. A few bighead and grass carp have been captured in Canada's portions of the Great Lakes. As of 2019, the Asian carp is known to be established in Canada at this time.

There are concerns the silver carp may spread into the Cypress Hills of Alberta and Saskatchewan through Battle Creek, the Frenchman River and other rivers flowing south out of the hills into the Milk River. The Milk River is a tributary of the Missouri River, where populations of Asian carp are well established.

In July 2015, two grass carp were found within days of each other in contained ponds near Toronto's Lake Ontario waterfront. This could mean a variety of things but has yet to prove that widespread reproduction is taking place in Lake Ontario, although both fish were male and fertile. The United States and Canadian authorities have been working together to determine where the fish originated and how to stop a potential invasion into the Great Lakes, however in early September three more grass carp were found near the Toronto Islands. In July 2025, one grass carp was found in the waters of Lake Huron near the Bruce Nuclear Generating Station in Kincardine. Fisheries and Oceans Canada had reportedly spotted a second Grass Carp previously accompanying it, and expects it to be caught in the near future.

In Mexico, grass carp have been established for many years in at least two river systems, where they are considered invasive, but no other Asian carp are known to have been introduced.

== Remediation efforts ==
Other efforts to reduce the number of Asian carp have included encouraging the public to eat more carp and fisheries shipping the fish to other markets, such as Israel.

As of 2016 there are efforts to reintroduce Alligator gar between Tennessee and Illinois as part of an effort to control Asian carp. While gar cannot eat adult carp they can eat juvenile carp.

=== Sound as a deterrent ===
The fish response to loud noises range from nothing to death. There is short term avoidance, where fish just simply move away from the sound, and long term avoidance, where fish alter their behavior to completely avoid the sound. A fish can also lose its hearing.

The United States Geological Survey is conducting research on the effects that sound has on the Asian Carp. The obvious connection is how the carp jump out of the water when a boat is going by. The current focus is finding sounds that will affect the Asian Carp and not the native fish. One active study being conducted in partnership with the U.S. Army Corps of Engineers Engineer Research and Development Center, the University of Minnesota Duluth, and the US Fish and Wildlife service found that the noise of a 100 HP boat motor to be highly effective. In fact, one study found that the noise of a boat motor impacted the Asian carp in one study and had little to no impact on the native fish population.

Other concerns with the use of sound can include damage to underwater structures, negative impacts on navigation, public safety, and potential weakening of shore lines.

=== Barriers ===
There are currently plans for a barrier to be built at the Brandon Road Lock and Dam on the Des Plaines River in Joliet, Illinois. It will include electricity, audio sounds, and bubbles as deterrents. The Brandon Road Interbasin Project will cost $1.15 billion. It is believed it will save the $7 billion annually fishing industry in the Great Lakes.

=== Other ===
US Rep. Clay Higgins has been calling for a bounty program since 2018. He feels as though the one enacted with the Coastwide Nutria Control Program has had good results and believes it can be replicated with the Asian carp.

Other efforts to reduce the number of Asian carp have included encouraging the public to eat more carp and fisheries shipping the fish to other markets, such as Israel.

== Legislation ==
In July, 2007, the U.S. Department of the Interior declared all silver carp and largescale silver carp to be injurious species under the Lacey Act. In July 2012, Congress included the "Stop Invasive Species Act" as an amendment to a transportation bill it approved. The Act requires USACE to speed up implementation of strategies to protect the Great Lakes from Asian carp.

U.S. Representative Dave Camp from Michigan's 4th district and Senator Debbie Stabenow of Michigan introduced the Close All Routes and Prevent Asian Carp Today (CARPACT), which directs the Army Corps of Engineers to take action to prevent Asian carp from entering the Great Lakes, which is estimated to cost more than $30 million in 2010. The act will make sure the locks and sluice gates at the O'Brien Lock and Dam and the Chicago Controlling Works are closed and remain closed until a better strategy is developed. The act will also enhance existing barriers and monitoring systems by giving authority to the Army Corps of Engineers to obtain real estate necessary for the construction and maintenance of the barrier. The Corps also has the authority to eliminate and prevent the spread of the carp using fish toxicants, commercial fishing and netting, and harvesting. A report issued in 2012 by the Great Lakes Commission concludes that physical separation of the Great Lakes and the Mississippi River watersheds is the best long-term solution to prevent Asian carp and other invasive species from migrating between the waterbodies.

In November 2009, carp genetic material was detected beyond the two electric barriers, leaving only a single lock/dam on the Calumet River between the detected presence and Lake Michigan. "This is absolutely an emergency", Joel Brammeier, acting president of the Alliance for the Great Lakes, was quoted as saying, referring to the ecological threat, and also mentioning the threat to recreational boaters. "Mr. Brammeier and some others called for the immediate closing of the lock ... though others doubted it was feasible to stop shipping traffic [there]." "All options are on the table", said Jacqueline Y. Ashmon, a spokeswoman for USACE. "We don't have any specifics."

In December 2009, USACE shut down one of the electric barriers for maintenance, and the Illinois Department of Natural Resources responded by dumping 2,200 gallons of the toxin rotenone into the canal. Rotenone, the report said, is deadly for fish, but not harmful to humans, animals or most other aquatic life. While "scores" of fish were killed, only one carp was found, near Lockport Lock and Dam and nearly six miles below the electronic barriers.

On September 8, 2010, the Council on Environmental Quality announced the appointment of John Goss as the Asian Carp Director. Goss's role is primarily to serve as the principal advisor to the CEQ's chair, Nancy Sutley on Asian carp issues, and oversee federal, state, and local coordination on Asian carp control efforts. Goss was previously executive director of the Indiana Wildlife Federation (a state affiliate of the National Wildlife Federation), director of the Indiana Department of Natural Resources, and vice-chairman of the Great Lakes Commission.

The Stop Asian Carp Act of 2011 was introduced to require the Secretary of the Army to study the feasibility of the hydrological separation, such as electric barriers, of the Great Lakes and Mississippi River Basins. The act provided 30 days for the Secretary of the Army to begin a study on the best means of implementing a hydrological separation of the Great Lakes to prevent the introduction of Asian carp. The study requirements included researching techniques that prevented the spread of carp from flooding, wastewater and storm water infrastructure, waterway safety operations and barge and recreational traffic.

In 2012, the U.S. Senate and House introduced new bills aimed at combating the spread of Asian carp into the Great Lakes by expediting some items of the Stop Asian Carp Act of 2011. The legislation provides direction to the U.S. Army Corps of Engineers to complete their study within 18 months on how to separate the Great Lakes from the Mississippi watersheds.

== As food ==
Asian carp have been popular food fish throughout Asia for thousands of years. The aforementioned four most well-known species, i.e. the bighead, silver, black, and grass carp are some of the most consumed food fish in the world and have been known as "Four Great Domestic Fishes" (Chinese: 四大家魚) in China since the Tang dynasty (618–907 AD). There are some specific carp recipes such as "sweet-and-sour carp" (Chinese: 糖醋鯉魚; pinyin: Tángcù Lǐyú) and "thick miso soup with carp" (鯉こく, Koikoku). However, many people in North America associate the name "Asian carp" with the long and widely established invasive Eurasian carp, a bottom-feeding, highly bony omnivorous species not widely regarded as food by Americans.

The pearly white flesh—though complicated by a series of Y-bones—is said to taste like cod and described as textured like a cross between scallops and crabmeat. Most Asian carp are low in heavy metal contaminants (such as mercury) because as mostly filter feeders and herbivores they are base consumers that are least affected by biomagnification. Volunteer efforts to increase the popularity further include making and selling carp-based dishes and using the entrails to make organic fertilizer.

From 2010 to January 2019, Illinois contract fishermen harvested 7.5 million pounds of carp from the Illinois River. Most of the haul was used to make bait, fertilizer, and pet food.

As of 2020, no market for Asian carp roe as a substitute for caviar existed in America, though a movement to promote it as such has been mounted in Europe.

=== Rebranding ===
Logo for Copi the new name for Asian carp

In June 2022, the Illinois Department of Natural resources announced a campaign to rebrand Asian carp as Copi as part of a Federal and state initiative to get the public to eat the invasive fish, decrease its numbers in Midwestern waterways, and prevent it invading the Great Lakes.

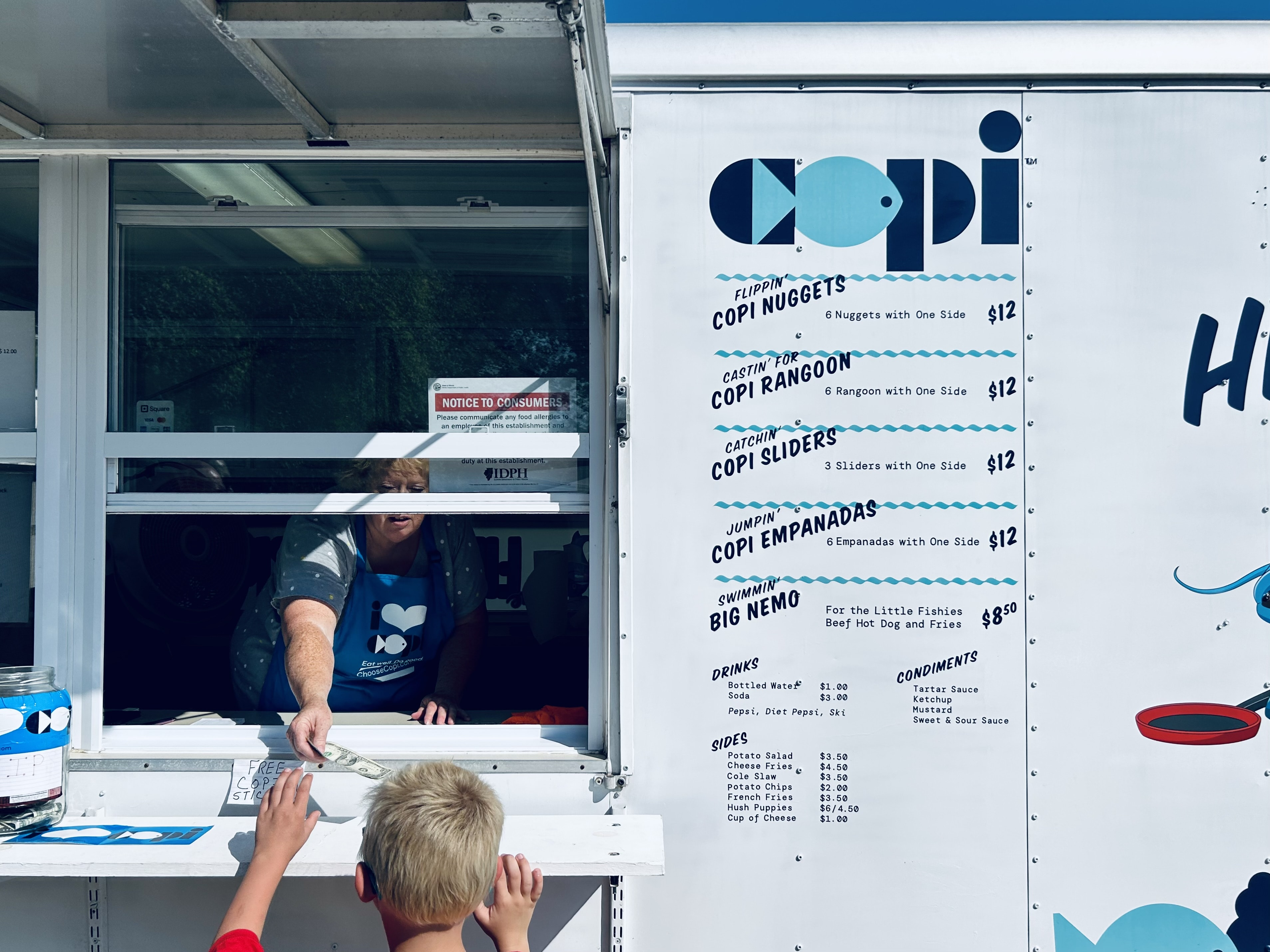
The Copi food truck at the 2023 Illinois State Fair in Springfield Illinois.

The federal United States Environmental Protection Agency—the Great Lakes Restoration Initiative is funding the Copi rebrand of Asian carp. Copi is available in restaurants in Illinois, Arizona and Washington, D.C.; in 7 fish markets in Illinois and Tennessee; and by 7 fish distributors in Illinois, Michigan, New York, Ohio, Maryland and Wisconsin. Success of the Copi rebrand of the invasive fish will be measured using pounds of removal as the key metric. Removal was projected to total 6,000,000 lbs at launch of the Copi rebrand, and increase to 12,000,000 in the first year following. Removal at 2 months from launch exceeded 10,000,000 lbs, on pace to beat year 1 projections.

=== Rebranding campaigns ===
In addition to the EPA formally renaming the species of carps "Copi", there are multiple additional rebranding campaigns are underway to increase the consumption of Asian carp to reduce its destructive numbers.

Among them is one in Illinois at the University of Illinois at Urbana-Champaign, which refers to the fish as "silverfin" and offers it in various forms in their cafeteria, including smoked, fried, and as sliders.

Another rebranding campaign, "The Perfect Catch", was set to begin with a media blitz in the summer of 2021. Its euphemism was being kept a secret. As part of the campaign, the fish will be pushed as flaky, low in mercury, and rich in protein and omega-3s.

Another euphemism is as Kentucky tuna.

A direct effort to increase consumption is the "Can't Beat Em, Eat Em" campaign started by a coalition of representatives from Louisiana and Illinois. The man behind the campaign, Louisiana chef Philippe Parola, was inspired by legendary Chef Paul Prudhomme and his Blackened Red Fish. The blackening was to make the fish more appealing to a wider consumer base.

== See also ==
- Alliance for the Great Lakes
- Great Lakes Areas of Concern
- Sea lamprey
