= Dixon Waterfowl Refuge =

Wetland preserve in Putnam County, Illinois

Coordinates: 41.220°N 89.338°W

Designations

Ramsar Wetland
- Official name: Sue and Wes Dixon Waterfowl Refuge at Hennepin & Hopper Lakes
- Designated: 2 February 2012
- Reference no.: 2042

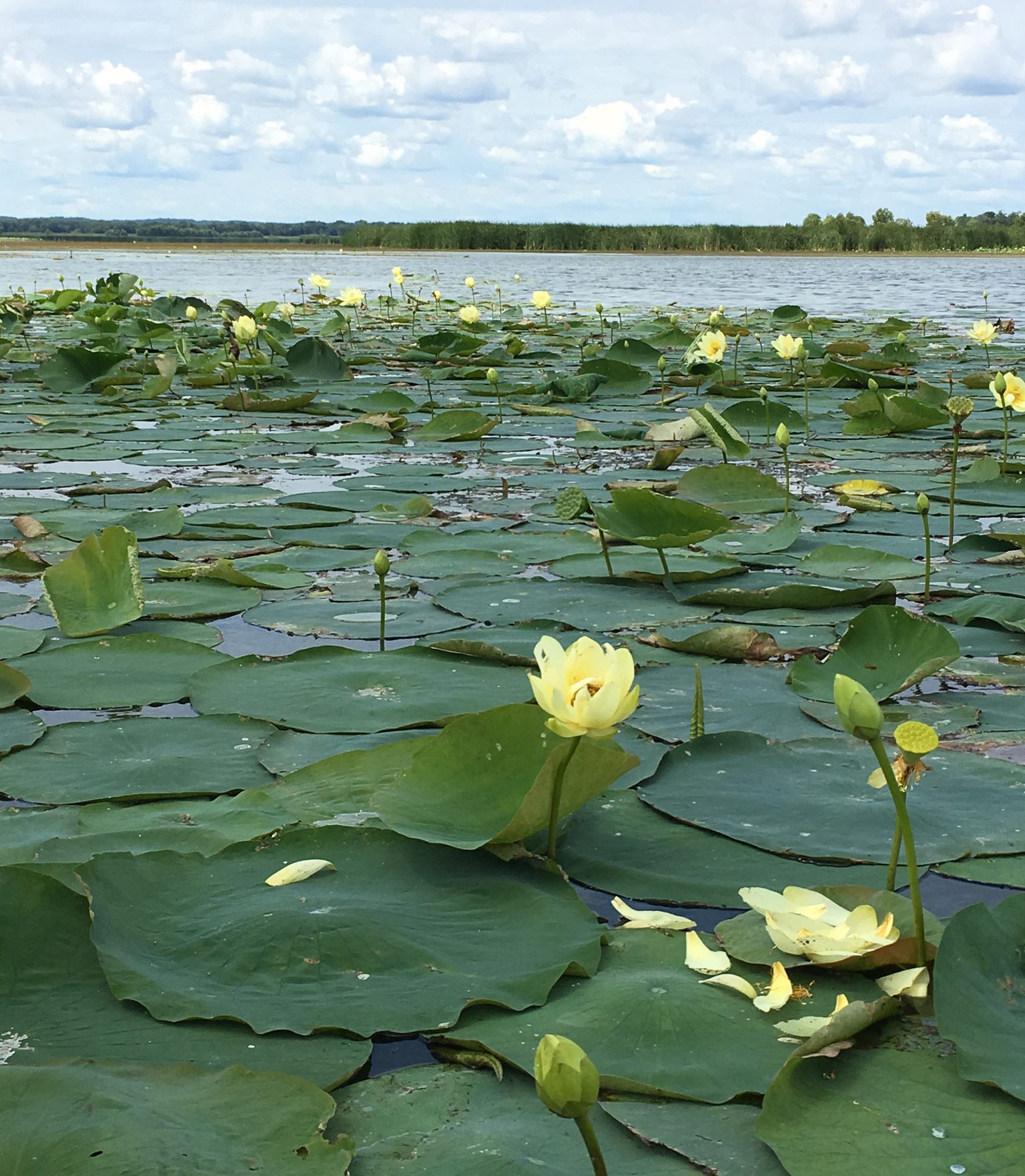
Nelumbo lutea, American lotus at Dixon Waterfowl Refuge

The Sue and Wes Dixon Waterfowl Refuge is a 3,100-acre riverine wetland in Putnam County, Illinois. Located just south of the county seat of Hennepin, it occupies the former site of Hennepin Lake and adjacent Hopper Lake. The reclaimed wetland is a Ramsar treaty site, a wetland of international importance.

== History ==
The Dixon Waterfowl Refuge in 1999. The area was lined with clay drain tile and mechanically drained to create arable farmland.

Historically, the banks of the Illinois River were lined with shallow lakes and wetlands, through which a broad shallow river flowed in a slow, braided course. The broad, bluff-lined river basin was rich in fish, shellfish, waterfowl, and peltry, exploited by Native Americans and by 1800s pioneers. The Hennepin area was so rich in wetland productivity that the New York City-based American Fur Company operated a fur-trading post here in the 1810s. Illinois pioneer Gurdon Saltonstall Hubbard traded for furs on the banks of Hennepin Lake in 1818–1819.

In the early decades of the 1900s, the invention of the steam shovel seemed to make it possible to commoditize and exploit much of the river lowlands, including Hennepin Lake and Hopper Lake. In 1908, local landowners formed the Hennepin Drainage and Levee District. Financial institutions lent money for levees, ditches, tile lines, and drainage pumps. Soon the watery, muddy ground was remapped as arable cropland.

With recurring crop surpluses in the closing years of the 20th century, many of the Illinois River drainage districts came to be seen as mistakes. In some cases, including the Hennepin Drainage and Levee District, landowners found the ongoing cost of maintaining and repairing the levee as well as the energy cost of the necessary pumping difficult to support from farming receipts. In 2000 eight farm families agreed to sell most of the Hennepin drainage district to a young not-for-profit conservation organization, The Wetlands Initiative. In 2001 the organization turned off the pump, began plugging or removing agricultural drainage tiles, and initiated various types of restoration work. A complex pattern of wet meadows, wet and dry prairies, marshes, and small waterbodies emerged in addition to the historic backwater lakes.

In December 2014, The Wetlands Initiative purchased 417 acres of adjacent upland, the Hickory Hollow parcel adjoining Illinois Route 26. The parcel, of which 283 acres will be kept as a permanent addition and restored to a mix of habitats, includes the primary groundwater drainage zone into the Refuge's Thomas W. and Elizabeth Moews Dore Seep, a 26-acre dedicated Illinois Nature Preserve located near the site's southern end.

== Honors ==
In 2004, the Illinois Audubon Society designated the Hennepin Lake site as an "Important Bird Area of Illinois". Birdwatchers joined other biology observers in logging species sightings in the Refuge. The pied-billed grebe, listed before 2001 as threatened in Illinois, increased in numbers, leading the Illinois Department of Natural Resources to successfully delist the bird. In 2005 the refuge was named in honor of donors Sue and Wes Dixon.

In February 2012, the Dixon Waterfowl Refuge was designated as the United States' 35th Wetland of International Importance. It joined the Emiquon Complex, downstream on the Illinois River, in this designation.

== Access ==
Dixon Waterfowl Refuge is open daily to the public. Access is from Hennepin Farms Road, which intersects Illinois Route 26 two miles south of Hennepin, Illinois. The Wetlands Initiative maintains multiple boardwalks and trails. A 30-foot-high birdwatching tower and roughly seven miles of hiking trails opened in 2015. Naturalists and volunteers remove invasive species such as common carp in the backwater lakes and invasive plants in the wet meadows and in Dore Seep. As of 2026, the refuge boats over 730 unique plant species and over 270 species of birds have been spotted nesting, foraging, or resting on its lands.
