= Gerald W. Adelmann =

American civic and environmental leader

- Born: Gerald “Jerry” W. Adelmann; Lockport, Illinois
- Citizenship: United States
- Education: Georgetown University (BA in art history), George Washington University (MPhil in American studies)
- Occupations: Civic and environmental leader

Gerald “Jerry” W. Adelmann is an American civic and environmental leader. Adelmann served as the director, and later the president and CEO, of Openlands between 1988 and 2023. Previously, he served as the president of The Canal Corridor Association.

== Career ==
=== Canal Corridor Association and Lockport Historic Preservation ===
In 1980, Adelmann partnered with the Open Lands Project (later Openlands). In 1982, Adelmann founded the Upper Illinois Valley Association, which was later renamed the Canal Corridor Association. Two years later, the association's work led to federal designation of the Illinois and Michigan Canal National Heritage Area, the first of 62 federally-protected National Heritage Areas in the U.S. Before and during his tenure at Canal Corridor Association, Adelmann also worked to preserve historic sites in Lockport, including Central Square, the Gaylord Building, and the Adelmann Block.

=== Openlands ===
In 1988, Adelmann assumed the role of executive director of Openlands and was later named its president and CEO.

Adelmann played a leadership role in founding the Chicago Wilderness Alliance, a coalition of over 250 partner organizations encompassing roughly 6,000 conservation practitioners across the region. He led the creation of several Openlands initiatives focused on improving ecosystems in the City of Chicago, including Treekeepers (1991), and Space to Grow (2014).

Adelmann collaborated on several major Chicago regional planning initiatives, including the 21st Century Open Space Plan (1990), The Northeastern Illinois Regional Greenways Plan (1992), the Northeastern Illinois Water Trails Plan (1999), the Calumet Area Land Use Plan (1999), and Where Worlds Connect: A New Vision for Chicago's Museum Campus (2022).

Adelmann has chaired the City of Chicago's Nature and Wildlife Committee and served as chair and Vice Chair at the Center for Humans and Nature. He is emeritus member of National Board of Advisors of the National Trust for Historic Preservation and an honorary member of the American Society of Landscape Architects. He also served as the Vice Chair of the board of the Illinois State Museum and the Illinois Nature Preserves Commission.

=== Collaborations with China and Myanmar ===
In the 1990s, Adelmann worked on historical preservation and conservation projects in Yunnan Province in China under the Center for US-China Arts Exchange at Columbia University, where he served on their advisory board then headed by Professor Chou Wen-chung. He brought collaborators to the project including The Field Museum of Natural History and the architectural firm Skidmore, Owings & Merrill, and many others.

He facilitated collaborations between local art scenes and governmental bodies in Beijing and Chicago, including the art installation “City Windows” by Qiao Xiaoguang at O’Hare International Airport depicting paper cut outs of Chicago and Beijing landmarks.

Since 2005, Adelmann has served as an international advisor to the Yangon Heritage Trust in Myanmar, which works on the comprehensive planning of the historical capital including the preservation of buildings in the historical core of Yangon.
