= The Wetlands Initiative =

US non-profit conservation organization

- Founded: 1994 (32 years ago) (operations began in 1995)
- Type: Nonprofit conservation organization
- Purpose: Wetland conservation
- Headquarters: Chicago, Illinois, United States
- Region served: Midwestern United States
- Executive director and president: Paul Botts
- Staff: 27 (2019)
- Website: wetlands-initiative.org

The Wetlands Initiative (TWI) is a non-profit conservation organization headquartered in Chicago, Illinois, United States. The Wetlands Initiative works with nonprofit and government partners and local communities to advance wetland restoration and science in the Midwestern United States. The organizational vision of TWI is: "A world with plentiful healthy wetlands improving water quality, climate, biodiversity, and human well-being."

== History ==
The Wetlands Initiative was incorporated in 1994 and operations began in 1995. In 2020, TWI celebrated its 25th anniversary with the release of two short films, including a celebration of co-founder Al Pyott, who died in June 2020. "Wetlands: Havens of Life" is an original video essay by author and naturalist Julian Hoffman, who was to serve as keynote speaker at a 25th-anniversary event that had been called off due to the COVID-19 pandemic.

== Projects ==
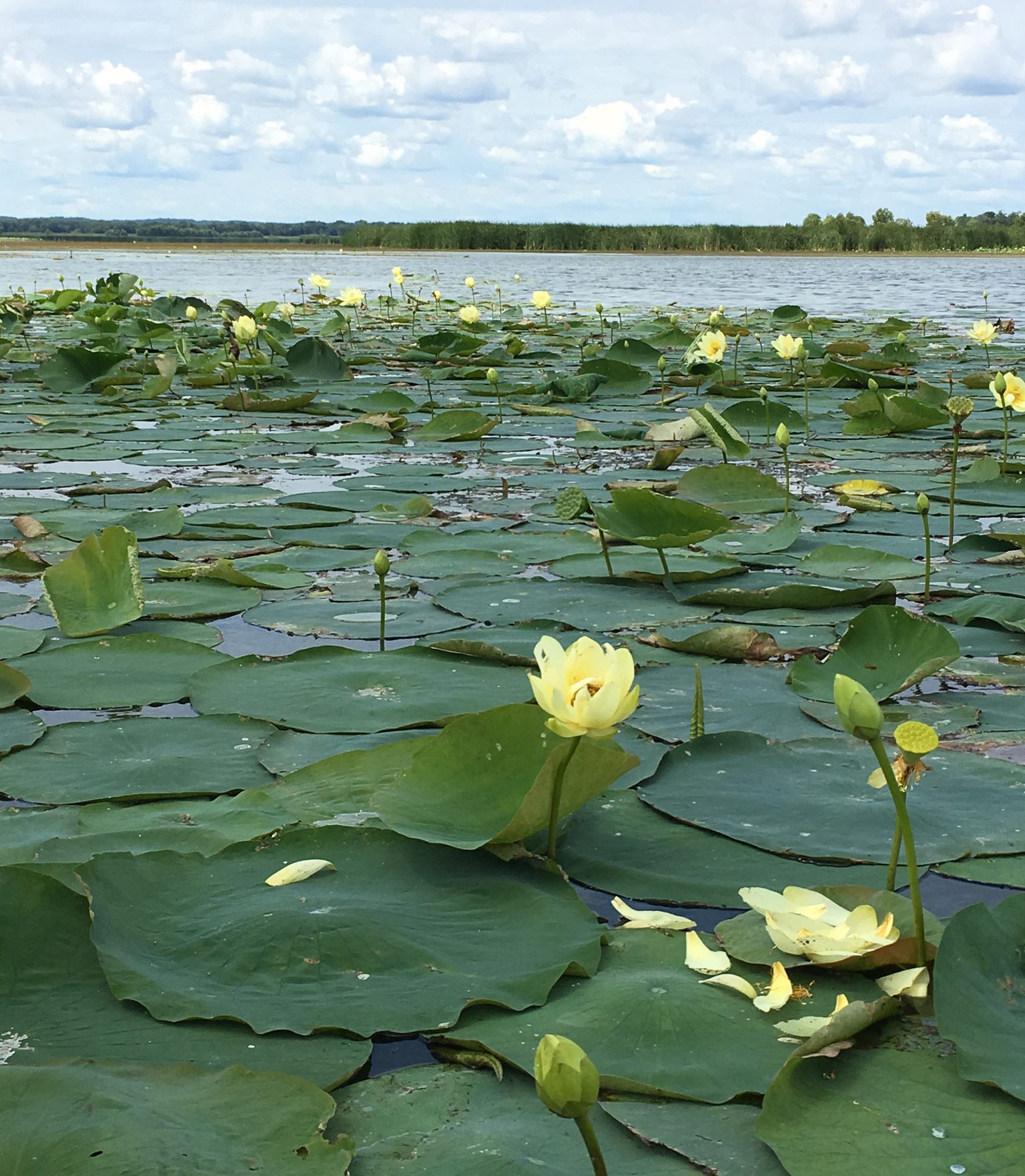
American lotus (Nelumbo lutea) at Dixon Waterfowl Refuge

The Wetlands Initiative owns and manages the Dixon Waterfowl Refuge just outside of Hennepin, Illinois. Most of the site is former Illinois River backwater lakes and wetlands that was drained in the early 20th century and farmed for more than 75 years. TWI purchased the land in 2000 and proposed to demonstrate that such a site could be, within a practicable cost and time, restored to genuinely high quality even after having been drained and farmed for so long. Restoration began in spring 2001, and by 2004 the refuge had been named by the National Audubon Society as an "Important Bird Area". In 2012 the Dixon Waterfowl Refuge was named a "Wetlands of International Importance" under the global Ramsar Convention, only the 34th site in the United States to achieve that recognition. A 26-acre portion of the preserve contains a rare seep, the largest high-quality seep in the Illinois River Valley, that is under protection as an Illinois Nature Preserve.

TWI is a leading partner at Midewin National Tallgrass Prairie, a United States Forest Service site. The site includes rare and endangered dolomite prairies and sedge meadows. In 2013, a section of Midewin restored by TWI and Openlands won a Conservation and Native Landscaping Award from Chicago Wilderness.

Starting in 2016, TWI with partners launched major restoration projects in the bi-state Calumet Region. At Indian Ridge Marsh, a Chicago Park District site at the extreme southeastern edge of Chicago, the partners are working to establish functional hemi marsh and prairie habitats at a site which for decades was used as a dump for slag and other waste produced by the area's Industrial Age steel mills. In Northwest Indiana, TWI helped organize a growing partnership which is restoring wetlands hydrology and native vegetation across a 2,000-acre corridor of the Little Calumet River which was cleared and leveed off for flood control. Each of these sites had long been identified by area conservationists as promising, but highly challenging, restoration targets.

Targeting agricultural runoff from Illinois farmland that is a major contributor to the growth of the Gulf Coast dead zone, TWI is encouraging and helping Illinois farmers to install constructed wetlands that mitigate the flow of agriculture pollutants into the Illinois River. The "Smart Wetlands" project operates in close partnership with the Illinois Sustainable Ag Partnership and farm-sector groups including the Illinois Corn Growers Association. Four of the in-line treatment wetlands had been installed as of fall 2020: two on farms in Bureau County, one on a farm in Livingston County and one on the campus of Illinois Central College, a community college which has the state's busiest agronomy degree program.
