= Lee Botts =

American environmentalist (1928–2019)

- Born: February 28, 1928
- Place: Mooreland Oklahoma
- Died: October 5, 2019 (age 91) Oak Park IL
- Children: 4
- Occupation: American Environmentalist, Author, and Founder of the Dunes Learning Center and Lake Michigan Federation. Executive Producer of Shifting Sands: On the Path to Sustainability. Director of the Great LakesBasin Commission.
- Websites: https://www.shiftingsandsmovie.com/

Leila (Lee) Carman Botts (February 28, 1928 – October 5, 2019) was an American environmentalist known primarily for her work related to conservation and restoration of the Great Lakes. She founded two non-profit organizations, directed a subagency of the U.S. Department of the Interior in the administration of President Jimmy Carter, authored or co-authored a number of books and reports on environmental issues, served in the administration of the late Chicago Mayor Harold Washington, and co-produced a documentary film called Shifting Sands: On the Path to Sustainability, on the history of the Indiana Dunes region.

== Personal life ==
=== Education ===
Carman attended North High School in Wichita, Kansas in 1944. She continued her education and attended Oklahoma Agricultural and Mechanical College (now Oklahoma State University). Carman completed her studies by mail, and earned an undergraduate degree in English. She was the first women in her extended family to attend college. During university Lelia was involved in: Pi Beta Phi sorority, the varsity radio board, orange and black quill International Relations club, Plays club, and part of the Aggregator and O'Collegian staff.

=== Family ===
Carman was the daughter of Mr. and Mrs. Bernard R. Carman, born in Mooreland Oklahoma, and raised in Oklahoma and southwestern Kansas. She grew up in the heart of the Dust Bowl during the Great Depression, describing it as a formative experience; growing up around her grandparents' wheat farm. On September 17, 1949 she married Lambert L. (Bud) Botts (1924-2003) whom she had met when they were undergraduates at Oklahoma A&M (Oklahoma State University). The couple married at Woodlawn Methodist Church in Chicago. Over the time span of the relationship Leila Lee Carman Botts had four children with Lambert L. Botts: one daughter, Elizabeth Botts, and three sons: Paul, Karl, and Alan Botts. The Botts family raised all four children in the neighborhood of Hyde Park, Chicago.

== Career ==
Lee Botts early career consisted over the years 1969-1994. Botts determination lead her to gain leadership roles in community projects, conferences, and campaigns. Working as a researcher, journalists, editor, advocate and consultant using her roles to enhance protection and preservation of the Great Lakes. Within her early career Botts did a lot of traveling around the United States and out of the country.

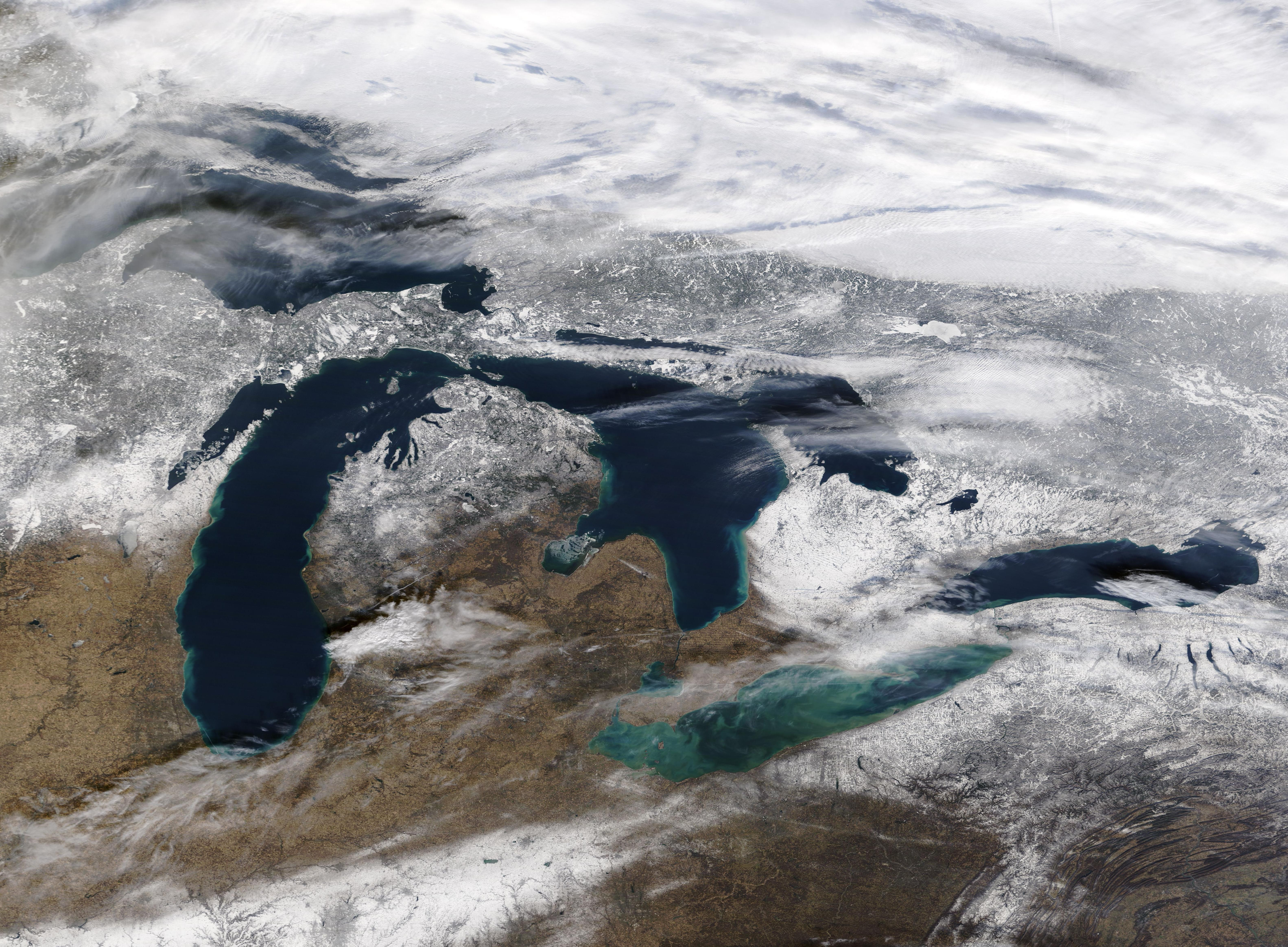
The Great Lakes

During Lee Botts early career she was a columnist for, and then editor of, the weekly Hyde Park Herald. Botts started off her career writing a garden column for the weekly Hyde Park Herald in Chicago in the 1950s, becoming the paper's editor-in-chief in the 1960s, the Post-Tribune previously reported. Conservation was her passion.

=== Open Lands Project ===
In 1969 she became a staff member at the Open Lands Project, now known as Openlands, in Chicago. Botts became involved as a volunteer in several local issues such as the Hyde Park-Kenwood Community Conference, and Botts took a leadership role in the campaign which in 1966 resulted in the creation of the federal Indiana Dunes National Lakeshore. Botts organized the first earth day celebration in Chicago. In 1970, Botts continued to work as a consultant to the Chicago Department to Streets and Sanitation, working on how Chicago can recycle plastic waste.

While on staff at Openlands, Botts founded the Lake Michigan Federation, which today operates as the Alliance for the Great Lakes. Within the wave of new interest in environmental issues in the U.S. during that period, the Federation was the first independent citizens' organization dedicated to the protection and preservation of a specific Great Lake. The new organization persuaded Mayor Richard J. Daley to have Chicago become the first Great Lakes city to ban phosphates in laundry detergents, led U.S. advocacy for the first binational Great Lakes Water Quality Agreement (1972), was a key advocate for the landmark federal Clean Water Act of 1972, and played a key role in persuading Congress to ban PCBs via the 1976 Toxic Substances Control Act.

After several years leading the Federation, including numerous trips to Washington D.C. to lobby Congress, Botts spent two years as a staff member at the Region 5 office of the young federal Environmental Protection Agency (USEPA). In 1977 President Carter named her head of the Great Lakes Basin Commission, headquartered in Ann Arbor, Michigan. After all federal basin commissions were eliminated in President Ronald Reagan's first federal budget, Botts held for several years a faculty research appointment at Northwestern University followed by two years as a staffer and consultant for the City of Chicago's new Department of the Environment. In 1986 she narrowly lost an election to the board of Chicago's countywide wastewater treatment district.

Twice during the 1990s Botts traveled to the former Soviet Union to coach fledgling citizen-environmental groups. In 1990, she participated in an environmental information exchange with Russian officials and citizens around Lake Baikal in Siberia. Later, she led a workshop on citizen participation in Kyiv, Ukraine; and helped organize a conference in Tartu, Estonia, on watershed management for government officials, environmentalists and academic experts. Lee also served as an advisor to the Commission for Environmental Cooperation that was established under the environmental side agreement to the 1994 (NAFTA) North American Free Trade Agreement.

=== Indiana Dunes Environmental Learning Center ===
Lee Botts late career lasted from 1997-2019. Bott's continued to be strategic in gaining to support to guide the community. During this time Botts lead foundations that offered educational experiences for children to learn about the environment in which they live. Lee Botts co-authored scholarly books and was involved in the Alliance for the Great Lakes as a board member and board president. Later on, became an executive producer for a documentary depicting the natural history and restoration in the norwest Indiana dunes.

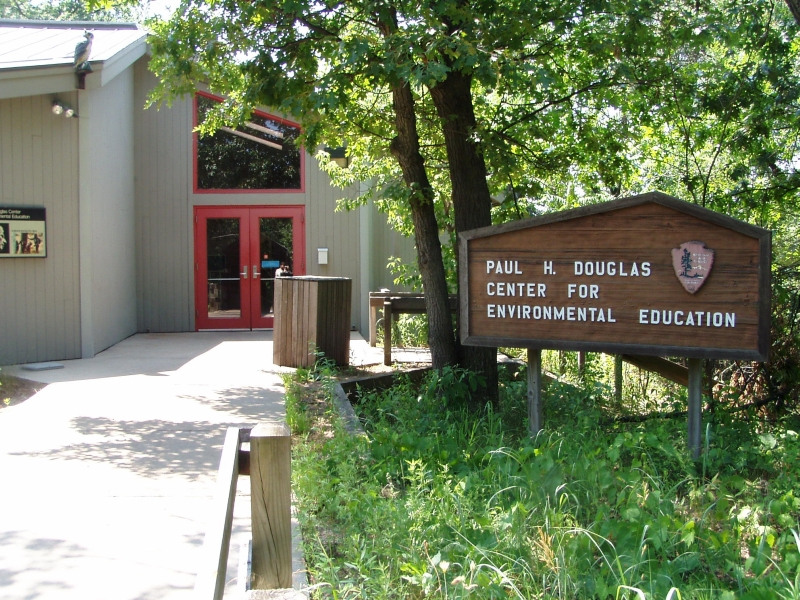
Indiana Environmental Learning Center

In 1997 Botts realized a longstanding idea by leading the founding of the Indiana Dunes Environmental Learning Center, now the Dunes Learning Center. Located within the Indiana Dunes National Park at the former Camp Goodfellow, which was a summer camp for children of U.S. Steel employees during the middle of the 20th century, the learning center offers sleepover environmental education programs for grade-school students and teachers. Since then, more than 175,000 students have experienced nature-based learning with the center's nonprofit education partner, Indiana Dunes National Park.

=== Co-author and Executive Film Producer ===
In 2005 Botts co-authored a scholarly book on the landmark Great Lakes Water Quality Agreement. She served on Indiana's state Water Pollution Control Board (a division of the Indiana Department of Environmental Management) from 2007 to 2010.

Botts was a board member emerita of the Alliance for the Great Lakes and board president emeritus of the Dunes Learning Center, served on the board of the Delta Institute and the Save the Dunes Council, and was an advisor to other environmental groups including the Shirley Heinze Land Trust.

Shifting Sands: On the Path to Sustainability, a 60-minute documentary film that Botts conceived and of which she was executive producer, was released in April 2016. The film, which depicts the natural history, the course of industrial development, and subsequent environmental restoration in the northwest Indiana dunes and surrounding region, has been shown on dozens of PBS stations and was nominated for a Midwest Emmy Award. Botts collaborated on that film with producer and director Pat Wisniewski, co-director and co-writer of the award-winning 2013 documentary about the great Kankakee marsh, Everglades of the North.

== Awards and recognition ==
In 1987 Botts was honored by the United Nations Environmental Program for making a difference for the global environment and has received awards from the USEPA and numerous local, regional and national environmental organizations and agencies. In 2002 the 1,400-member national Clean Water Network named her as one of the 30 persons who had made the most difference under the pioneering federal 1972 Clean Water Act. Until 2010 she represented environmental interests on the Indiana Water Pollution Control Board. Most recently she was named one of 60 fellows for the Purpose Prize Institute from 1,000 persons nominated nationally, a program of the John Templeton Foundation that recognizes persons who make a difference in their communities after the age of 60. In 2009 she was among the first inductees into the newly created Indiana Conservation Hall of Fame in Indianapolis.

In 2008 more than 200 colleagues, family and friends gathered in downtown Chicago for an 80th birthday celebration event to benefit the Alliance for the Great Lakes. The Alliance has created an endowment fund in her honor.
