= BEACH Act =

The Beaches Environmental Assessment and Coastal Health Act of 2000, or BEACH Act, is a United States federal statute that sets national standards for recreational water testing and authorizes grants to pay for beach monitoring programs at state and federal levels. The Act was signed by President Bill Clinton on October 10, 2000. The law amends the Clean Water Act and requires the Environmental Protection Agency (EPA) to set standard criteria for testing, monitoring, and notifying the public of possible pollution within coastal recreational waters. Water pollution levels are required to be monitored regularly for bacteria, such as Escherichia coli (E.coli), and other pathogen indicators. Agencies at local, state, and federal levels report and monitor the levels and post warning signs as necessary.

== Background ==
Congress passed the BEACH Act based on the concern for public health and water quality. It was originally known as Beach Bill (H.R. 999) when it was presented to the House of Representatives on March 4, 1999. It was proposed a second time to the House on April 19, 1999 as the Beaches Environmental Assessment, Cleanup, and Health Act of 1999; the BEACH Act was amended and passed through the House on April 22, 1999. Numerous changes were made to the draft before being passed through the Senate, including deadlines on publications and studies for the EPA, the clarification of waters covered, the inclusion of territories and Indian Tribes, and implementation of monitoring programs. The Senate passed the act on September 21, 2000 and President Clinton signed the act into law on October 10, 2000.

The BEACH Act covers 35 coastal recreational waters near coastal states and territories. Supporters of the BEACH Act argue that without the support of environmental groups such as the Natural Resources Defense Council (NRDC), Center for Marine Conservation, and American Oceans Campaigns, the BEACH Act would not exist.

Timeline of events:
March 4, 1999	BEACH Act introduced to the House of Representatives
April 19, 1999	Act amended by the Committee on Transportation
April 22, 1999	Act agreed to and passed in House
August 25, 2000	Committee on the Environment and Public Works comments
September 21, 2000	Act agreed to and passed in Senate with an amendment by unanimous consent
September 26, 2000	Process of resolving differences between the House and Senate
September 28, 2000	Act presented to President Clinton
October 10, 2000	President Clinton signs the BEACH Act, officially becomes Public Law No: 106-284

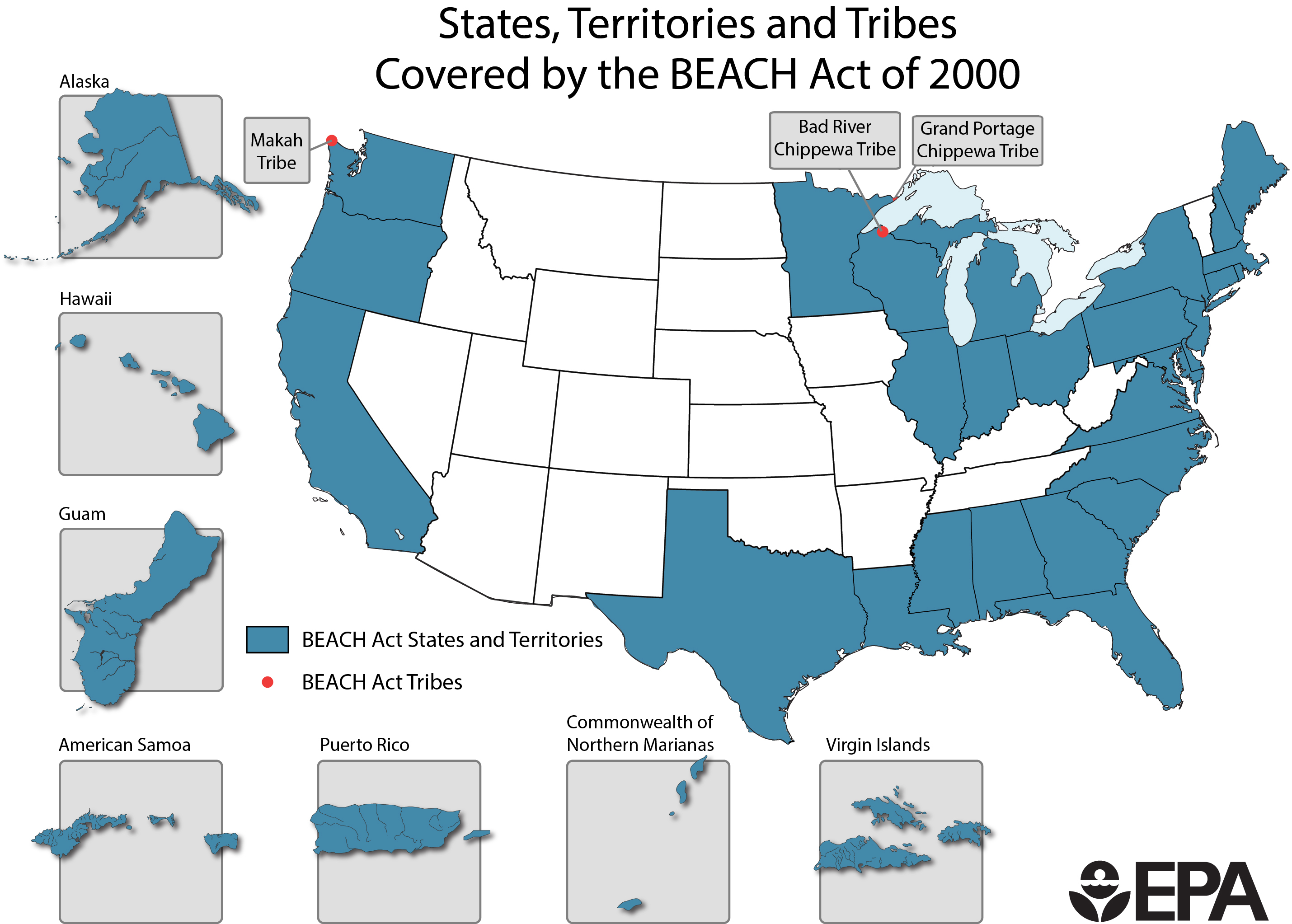
This map shows the regions covered by the legislation of the BEACH Act of 2000. Source: EPA

=== Surfrider Foundation Involvement ===
Members of the Surfrider Foundation and other activists carried a Sign-the-Surfboard petition in support of the BEACH Act through Congress when the act was proposed to President Clinton; they gained over 100 signatures from members of the House of Representatives and Senate. The Surfrider Foundation continues to fight for the implementation and funding of the BEACH Act by emphasizing the importance of public health. Surfrider also has many alliances with other organizations and programs, such as the Clean Ocean Action, Riverkeeper, NRDC, Waterkeeper Alliance, Heal the Bay, and Alliance for the Great Lakes. These organizations have been active in supporting federal funding for the BEACH Act grant program.

=== Water Quality Criteria ===
Initially, the coastal recreation water quality criteria stated that every state adjacent to coastal recreational waters must submit their pathogen and pathogen indicator criteria no later than 42 months after the enactment of section 303(i) and section 304(a). The revised standards of coastal recreation water quality criteria under section 304(a)(9) states that every state adjacent to coastal recreational waters must submit to the revised water quality criteria of pathogen and pathogen indicators set by the Administrator no later than 36 months after the Administrator's publications.

== Provisions as a result of the BEACH Act ==
The BEACH Act added numerous amendments to the Clean Water Act. For example, section 303(i) requires that states, territories, and tribes along the coasts implement new water quality standards for pathogens and pathogen indicators. The addition of Section 303(i) also authorizes the EPA to regulate states to abide by health standards.

Under the addition of Section 104(v) and 304(a), the EPA must perform studies on the effects pathogens and pathogen indicators have on human health, and publish new or revised pathogen indicator criteria based on prior studies. Section 303(i)(1)(B) requires that states, territories, or tribes along coastal recreational waters must adopt any new, or revised, EPA water quality standards based on Section 304(a) criteria within three years of publication.

Section 502 defines key terms in the BEACH Act. For example, coastal recreation waters are defined as "Great Lakes, marine coastal waters, coastal estuaries designated under the Clean Water Act Section 303[c] by a State for swimming, bathing, surfing, and any other water contact activities," and exclude waters, waters upstream of a river, or stream's mouth which have access to the open sea.

Section 406 of the Clean Water Act had the largest revisions. Under this provision, the EPA is required to:

1. Publish a document containing performance criteria within 18 months from the date of enactment for the following:
  1. Monitoring program and assessment of the coastal recreation waters, and water quality standards of the pathogens and pathogen indicators.
  2. Process of notifying the public, local government, and federal government on any possibility of water levels exceeding quality standards.
2. The EPA also has authority to award grants to state and local governments for the implementation of their beach monitoring and assessment programs. Grant recipients must submit a report to the EPA that outlines their water quality monitoring methodologies, data recorded, and actions taken to notify the public about the water quality standards. Grants for any state or local government are expected to be used for establishing a monitoring and notification program that meets the following EPA criteria:
  - Identifies all coastal recreation waters in the states and territories.
  - Outlines methodologies for implementing the monitoring program.
  - Outlines procedures for detecting the ecological effects of pathogen and pathogen indicator levels.
  - Describes how frequent monitoring and assessments should be performed, (factors for this are based on the periods of recreational use of the waters, the nature and extent of use during these periods, the proximity of the water to point sources and nonpoint sources of pollution, and any effects storms have on the water).
  - Communication measures that will be taken to inform the EPA, local government and public of "the occurrence, nature, location, pollutants involved, and extent of any exceeding of, or likelihood of exceeding, applicable water quality standards for pathogens and pathogen indicators"
  - Procedures for distributing public notices with information about the safety of coastal recreation waters and if they are not meeting (or are not expected to meet) water quality standards for pathogens and pathogen indicators.
  - Measures to inform the public of the potential health risks of exposure to pathogens and pathogen indicators. The grants for the federal programs follow the same guidelines above, except the federal programs aim to protect overall public health and safety and have a deadline of three years from the date of enactment.
3. Establish a public database that provides all available data on pathogen and pathogen indicators in any coastal recreation water.

== Funding ==
When the BEACH Act became federal law, the federal government had to step in and take responsibility of providing funds to individual states and governments. Congress was provided $30 million for the BEACH Act, but Congress did not use nearly the amount of money for its programs. In 2007, Congress funded $9.9 million for water quality monitoring. In 2008, however, funding decreased to $9.75 million. Difficulties within the economy have led to stringent budgets for the BEACH Act funds. There has been a $10 million cut in grants for testing, which has led local governments to fund pollution monitoring activities. The decrease of federal funds caused testing to become less frequent.

In 2007, U.S Representatives gathered to discuss the issue of the undercut of funding. They proposed a $60 million fund for water testings at a national pollution level. In conjunction to the BEACH Protection Act of 2007, most of the water quality testings may could have been put into play. However, Congress never passed the BEACH Protection Act, leaving beach testings extremely under-funded.

In 2015, federal funds of $9.5 million have to be distributed among 35 coastal states. These funds have to protect the lives of 100 million people who are active beach-goers. Beach programs help protect public confidence in pristine beaches, eventually attracting tourists and jobs.

=== The BEACH Act Grant Program ===
Coastal and Great Lake states are eligible for funding if they fall under the requirements of CWA section 406 (b)(2)(A). Eligible "states" include the District of Columbia, the Commonwealth of Puerto Rico, the Virgin Islands, Guam, American Samoa, and the Commonwealth of the Northern Mariana Islands. In order for tribes to be eligible for grants, they must be nearby coastal recreational waters that are accessible to the public. The tribe must also show that it abides by the "treatment in the same manner as a state." Once granted funds, states and tribes must use these funds for programs for comprehensive monitoring or notifying. EPA has set aside approximately $149 million in grants for implementation of beach programs. When allocating grants, EPA considers several factors such as the length of the beach season, shoreline miles, and coastal county population. The EPA wants Great Lakes and coastal states to apply for the 2011 BEACH grant.

The first grant allocation was issued on March 31, 2003. To apply for a grant, applicants must report an outline of methodologies, data, and steps taken to notify the public about water quality standards. The state and local government must abide by different steps. These steps include identifying all coastal recreation waters, methodologies implementing programs, outlining steps for how to move forward.

Fiscal Year	Grant Total
2016	$9,462,000
2015	$9,486,640
2014	$9,549,000
2013	$9,349,000
2012	$9,864,000

== State Implementation ==
Once a state is granted funds for the BEACH Act, they must comply to the EPA Administrator(s) and what they deem appropriate. The Administrator writes up a report that describes two aspects. One, the report must consist of data collected as part of the program for monitoring and notifying. Second, the report must address the actions needed to alert the public when water quality levels exceed national levels. If states do not adopt the water quality criteria of pathogen and pathogen indicators that the Administrator has proposed, the Administrator will immediately propose new, revised regulations that allow state to better meet its standards.

Indiana implemented grant funds for the Lake Michigan Beaches Program. The funding increased monitoring of the bacteria, E.coli, at Indiana's Lake Michigan Beaches. The presence of E.coli is potent, because the bacteria symbolizes sewage or waste contamination. To comply with the BEACH Act, the state of Indiana developed a Beach Monitoring and Notification Plan (BMNP). Prior to Indiana's BMNP, Indiana's coastal beaches were overseen once or twice a week. After supplying funds for the BMNP, communities came together to monitor pollution levels five to seven days out of the week. The Indiana Department of Environmental Management also allocated its resources to share the importance of beach monitoring. Beach managers and park departments developed a system of kiosks to inform the public when there are signs of E.coli contamination in recreational waters.

== BEACON 2.0 ==
Under the BEACH Act, the EPA is required to publish a report every four years that outlines recommendations for water quality improvement, the actions that have been taken to enhance the quality of coastal recreation waters, an evaluation of the efforts taken to implement the BEACH Act at the federal, state, and local level; and the recommendations to improve monitoring systems for coastal recreation waters. To meet this requirement, the EPA created the Beach Advisory and Closing Online Notification (BEACON) system. The BEACON system is a public database that shows the pollution within coastal recreational waters. Recently, it has been upgraded to BEACON 2.0 with a new mapping interface, report creation wizard, and RSS feed generator. The EPA databases are the data sources for the BEACON 2.0 system. Data is gathered from all states, tribes, and territories that receive grants from the BEACH Act.

There are four main databases that BEACON 2.0 supplements its information from. The Reach Address Database (RAD) provides geographic data, defining a beaches location and the locations of water monitoring stations. The STOrage and RETrieval (STORET) database and Water Quality Exchange (WQX) provides updated data from the monitoring stations. The PRogram tracking, beach Advisories, Water quality standards, and Nutrients (PRAWN) database provides information on any beach closings or advisories.

== Post 2000 BEACH Act Movements ==
The BEACH Act jumpstarted numerous water related, health-based movements such as the Beach Protection Act of 2007, Clean Coastal Environment and Public Health Act of 2009, and the EPA's 2012 Recreational Water Quality Criteria.

EDC vs. EPA (2003)

Following the passing of the BEACH Act, the EPA failed to comply to the provisions made to section 104 and section 304(a) by the specified deadline, and the NRDC sued for inaction. EPA has made promises to update their storm water protections, but they have not acted upon this. The EPA settled to publish a new standard in 2012.
