= Openlands =

US non-profit organization

- Formation: 1963
- Type: Non-profit organization
- Headquarters: Chicago, Illinois
- Region served: Greater Chicago Metropolitan Area
- President: Michael Davidson
- Main organ: Board of Directors
- Website: openlands.org

Openlands is a non-profit conservation organization and accredited land trust that works with groups and individuals in northeastern Illinois, northwestern Indiana, and southeastern Wisconsin.

The organization focuses on four major areas of work: protecting land, water, and wildlife; growing the tree canopy; empowering people and communities; and advocating for policy solutions. It is a member of Chicago Wilderness.

== History ==
Openlands (originally Open Lands Project) was established in 1963 as a program of the Welfare Council of Metropolitan Chicago. During its early years, Openlands was involved in advocacy efforts related to the Illinois Prairie Path, the establishment of Indiana Dunes National Lakeshore, and the creation of the Illinois & Michigan Canal National Heritage Corridor. In 1968, Openlands became an independent organization under the leadership of founding chairman Jeffrey R. Short Jr. and executive director Gunnar A. Peterson. Openlands is one of the first organizations in the United States to address environmental issues within a metropolitan region.

Gerald W. Adelmann served as the head of the organization from 1988 to 2023 and expanded its reach, preserving vast open spaces, restoring wetlands, and increasing Chicago's tree canopy, among other initiatives. In 2023, Michael S. Davidson was appointed president and CEO.

== Openlands Gerald W. Adlemann Conservation Leadership Award ==
Since 1990, Openlands has honored an individual or group who has demonstrated leadership at the intersection of conservation and advocacy, community organizing, planning, academia, and the arts. Previous awardees include Adele Simmons (2022), U.S. Senator Dick Durbin (2021), Morton Arboretum - Chicago Region Trees Initiative (2017), Terry Evans (2014), Philip Enquist (2012), and Chicago Mayor Richard M. Daley (1996). In 2024, the award was renamed the Gerald W. Adelmann Conservation Leadership Award. The award is made annually at the Openlands Annual Luncheon.

== Projects ==
- 1964: The Illinois Prairie Path in DuPage County was approved as the first rails-to-trails project in the United States.
- 1965: Beall Woods, an old-growth forest in southern Illinois, was purchased by the state and designated a nature preserve.
- 1966: Openlands contributed to the establishment of Indiana Dunes National Lakeshore, later designated a national park.
- 1968: Peacock Prairie (now James Woodworth Prairie), a black soil tallgrass prairie, was preserved and later transferred to the University of Illinois Chicago.
- 1969: Goose Lake Prairie State Park was established, protecting the largest remnant tallgrass prairie east of the Mississippi River.
- 1970: Volo Bog was dedicated as an Illinois Nature Preserve. That same year, Openlands launched the Lake Michigan Federation (now the Alliance for the Great Lakes) to protect the Lake Michigan ecosystem.
- 1971: Openlands organizes support for a successful referendum to establish the McHenry County Conservation District.
- 1972: Ryerson Woods Conservation Area was established as part of the Lake County Forest Preserves.
- 1973: Openlands supported and help pass the Chicago Lakefront Protection Ordinance to preserve the lakefront from encroaching development. That same year, Openlands supported community efforts to create what is now the North Park Village Nature Center.
- 1979: Friends of the Chicago River was created as a program within Openlands and became an independent organization in 1988.
- 1980: Openlands acquired land along Nippersink Creek for restoration, later transferring it to the McHenry County Conservation District.
- 1982: Openlands coordinated and led a ten-year organizing effort to acquire railroad right-of-way to create the Old Plank Road Trail (Illinois) in Will and Cook Counties.
- 1984: Following advocacy efforts from Openlands, President Ronald Reagan signed legislation establishing the Illinois & Michigan Canal National Heritage Corridor, the nation's first National Heritage Area.
- 1991: Openlands launched TreeKeepers, a program that trains and certifies volunteers to care for trees on some public property in the Chicago region. Program trainers include tree experts, arborist, and Openlands staff. TreeKeepers is part of Openland's Urban Forestry Program which has received $1.5 million from MacArthur Foundation since 2013 to increase the Chicago region's tree canopy and expand community outreach and engagement. Since the program launched, the organization has trained more than 2,000 volunteers. More than 10,000 trees have been planted in Chicago by volunteers of the program since 2013.
- 1996: After several years of leadership and advocacy from Openlands, President Bill Clinton signed legislation to create the Midewin National Tallgrass Prairie at the former Joliet Arsenal. Midewin is the first designated Tallgrass Prairie in the nation, and it is the largest protected area in Northeastern Illinois.
- 2005: Openlands initiated the O'Hare Modernization Wetlands Mitigation Project, successfully restoring over 530 acres of wetlands and protecting a total of 1,620 acres of natural areas.
- 2011: The Openlands Lakeshore Preserve in Fort Sheridan opened to the public, featuring 77 acres of ravines and bluffs along Lake Michigan.
- 2012: Hackmatack National Wildlife Refuge was established by the U.S. Fish and Wildlife Service after seven years of advocacy by Openlands and partners. Hackmatack was the first national wildlife refuge in the Chicago region and will eventually consist of 11,200 acres of protected wildlife habitat.
- 2013: Openlands founded the Birds in My Neighborhood program in 2013 to introduce urban public school children to bird-watching and nature.
- 2014: Openlands and Healthy Schools Campaign launch Space to Grow to transform Chicago schoolyards through green infrastructure, with capital partners Chicago Public Schools, Chicago Department of Water Management, and the Metropolitan Water Reclamation District of Greater Chicago.
- 2018: Conserve Lake County (serving Lake County, Illinois) merged into Openlands.
- 2020: Openlands created the African American Heritage Water Trail to highlight the often untold stories of Black Chicagoans along the Little Calumet River.
- 2022: With partners in Cook County, Openlands supported passage of the "Vote Yes for Clean Air, Clean Water, and Wildlife," referendum, which provided an additional $45 million for the Forest Preserves of Cook County to implement the 2014 Next Century Conservation Plan.
- 2023: Openlands, in partnership with the Wetlands Initiative, secured a $1.5 million America the Beautiful Challenge grant to restore 1,321 acres of prairie, savanna, and wetlands at Midewin National Tallgrass Prairie.
- 2024: Openlands, in partnership with the Conservation Fund and Illinois Audubon Society, purchased Tamarack Farms, a 985-acre property, to enhance the Hackmatack National Wildlife Refuge, marking it as the single largest property within the refuge's boundaries.
