= Midewin National Tallgrass Prairie =

Largest tallgrass prairie restoration area in the United States, located in Illinois

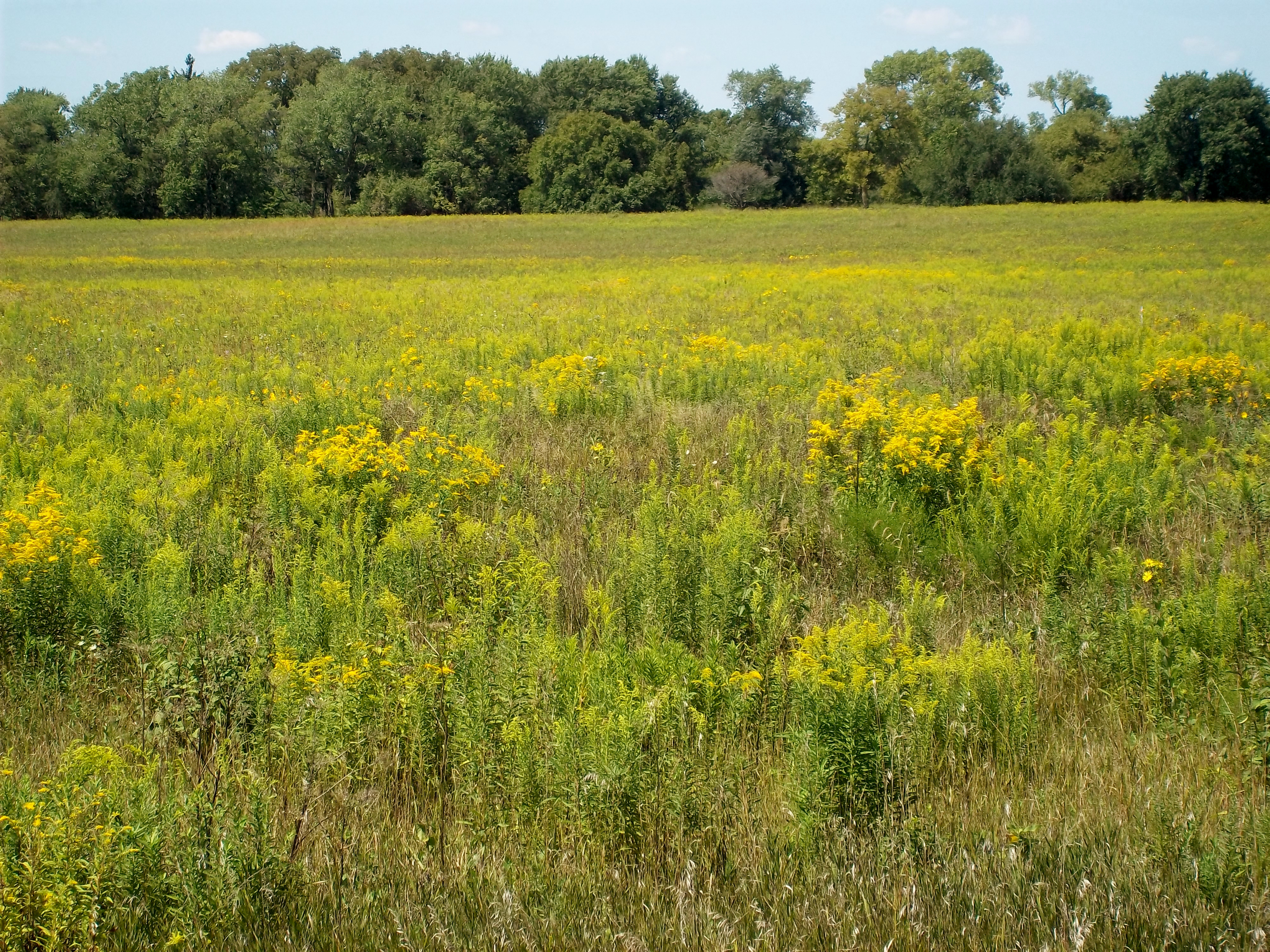
- Tallgrass prairie and woodlands

- Location within Illinois
- Location: Will County, Illinois, United States
- Nearest city: Wilmington
- Coordinates: 41°22′44″N 88°06′41″W
- Area: 18,226 acres (73.76 km^{2})
- Established: 1996
- Governing body: U.S. Forest Service
- Website: www.fs.usda.gov/r09/midewin

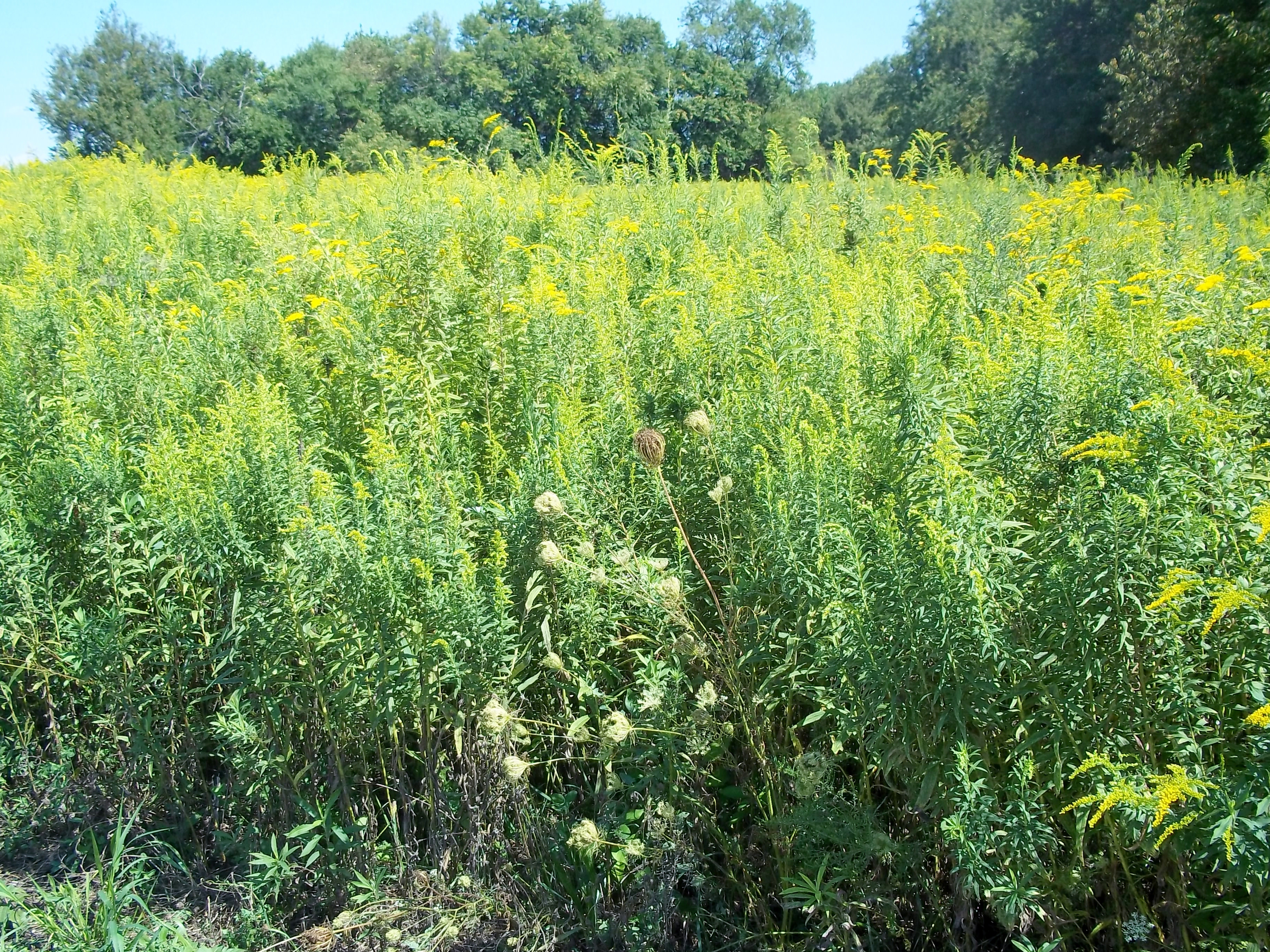
Flora of the Midewin National Tallgrass Prairie

The Midewin National Tallgrass Prairie (MNTP) is a tallgrass prairie reserve and is preserved as United States National Grassland operated by the United States Forest Service. The first national tallgrass prairie ever designated in the United States and the largest conservation site in the Chicago Wilderness region, it is located on the site of the former Joliet Army Ammunition Plant between the towns of Elwood, Manhattan and Wilmington in northeastern Illinois. Since 2015, it has hosted a conservation herd of American bison to study their interaction with prairie restoration and conservation.

== Ecology ==
The tallgrass prairie reserve is in the central forest-grasslands transition ecoregion of the temperate grasslands, savannas and shrublands biome.

Midewin remains the only federal tallgrass prairie preserve east of the Mississippi River, where surviving areas of that habitat are extremely rare. With the adjacent Des Plaines Fish and Wildlife Area and a number of other state and county protected areas in the immediate area, Midewin forms the heart of a conservation macrosite totaling more than 40,000 acres (16,000 ha) of protected land.

The pre-European settlement vegetation map of Midewin shows most of the site was prairie prior to the arrival of European settlers. The northwestern corner of the site along Jackson Creek was forest. Another small, forested area existed in the extreme southwest corner of Midewin along the Kankakee River and Prairie Creek.

Several not-for-profit conservation organizations have played active roles in the restoration of high-quality tallgrass prairie, dolomite prairie, sedge meadows, swales and related communities at Midewin. These include the Wetlands Initiative, Openlands, and the Illinois chapter of The Nature Conservancy and several other members of the Chicago Wilderness collaborative.

== History ==
Midewin is a place that embodies the wide-ranging possibilities for recalibrating our relationships with the natural world . . . it also establishes a path into the future in which respectful coexistence with nature is foregrounded . . . And amidst the Sixth Extinction of wild species, when three billion birds alone have been lost from North America in just the past 50 years, Midewin also reveals . . . what can be returned to the world when we devote our energies, attention, and care to it.

— Julian Hoffman (2020)

The name Midewin (/mɪˈdeɪwɪn/, mi-DAY-win) is a Potowatomi Native American word referring to the tribe's healers, who it was believed also kept the tribal society in balance. Research since the establishment of the park has found evidence of a pre-European–contact village (c. 1600) from the Oneota culture in a place on the site called Middle Creek.

=== Establishment ===
The Midewin National Tallgrass Prairie was established by federal law in 1996. Major proponents of the prairie establishment and restoration included World War II flying ace William J. Cullerton.

The Illinois Land Conservation Act (Public Law 104-106) created the Midewin National Tallgrass Prairie, designated the transfer of 19,165 acres (7,756 ha) of land in Illinois from the U.S. Army to the U.S. Department of Agriculture's Forest Service.

The Illinois Land Conservation Act mandates that Midewin be managed to meet four primary objectives:

- To conserve, restore, and enhance the native populations and habitats of fish, wildlife, and plants.
- To provide opportunities for scientific, environmental, and land use education and research.
- To allow the continuation of existing agricultural uses of lands within Midewin National Tallgrass Prairie for the next 20 years, or for compatible resource management uses thereafter.
- To provide recreational opportunities that are compatible with the above purposes.

=== Land ===
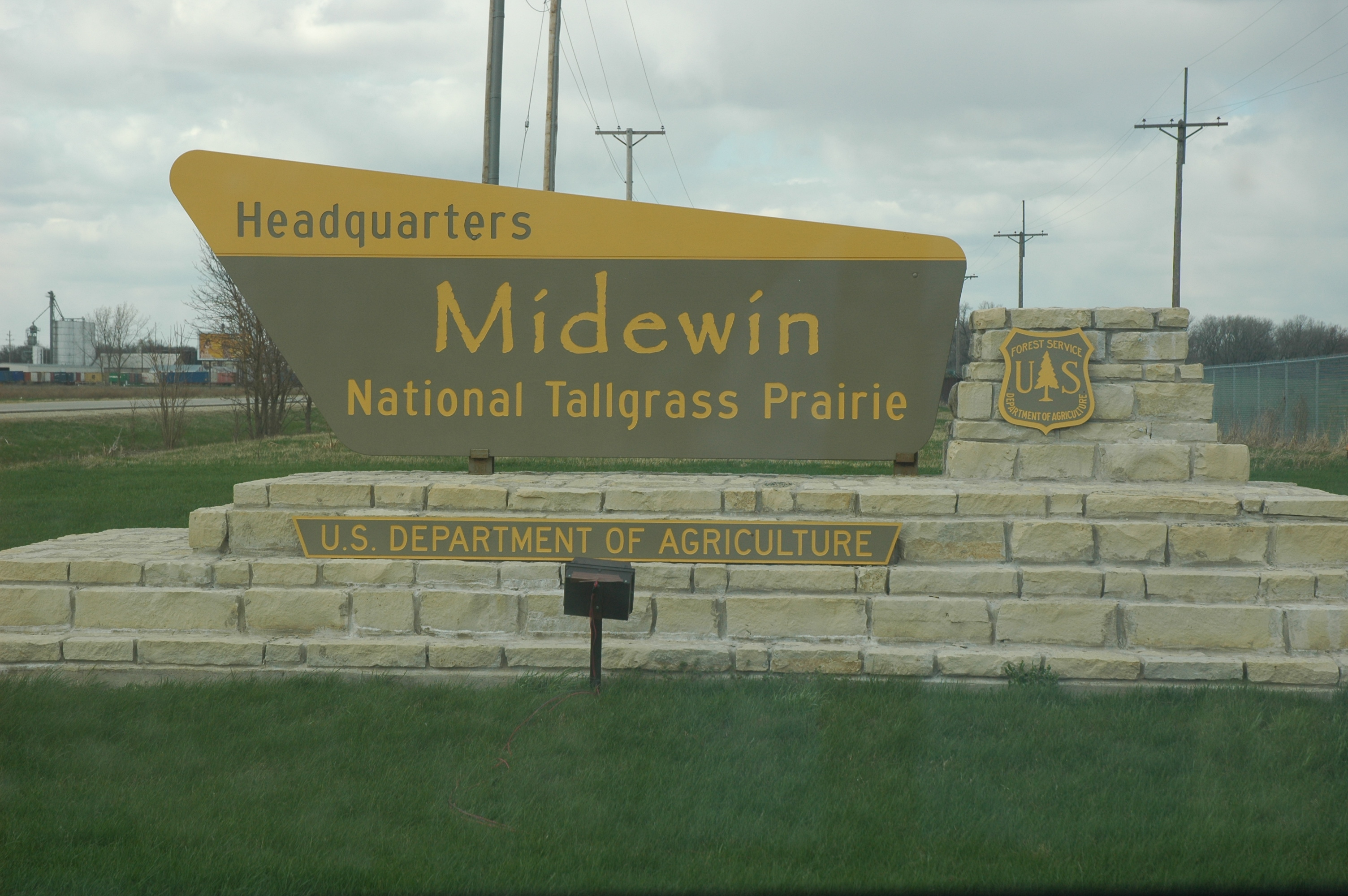
MNTP entrance

The first land transfer from the Army to the Forest Service took place on March 10, 1997, and included 15,080 acres (6,100 ha) of land that was believed to be free from contamination. Subsequent land acquisitions place the current size of Midewin at about 20,000 acres (8,100 ha).

=== Bison ===
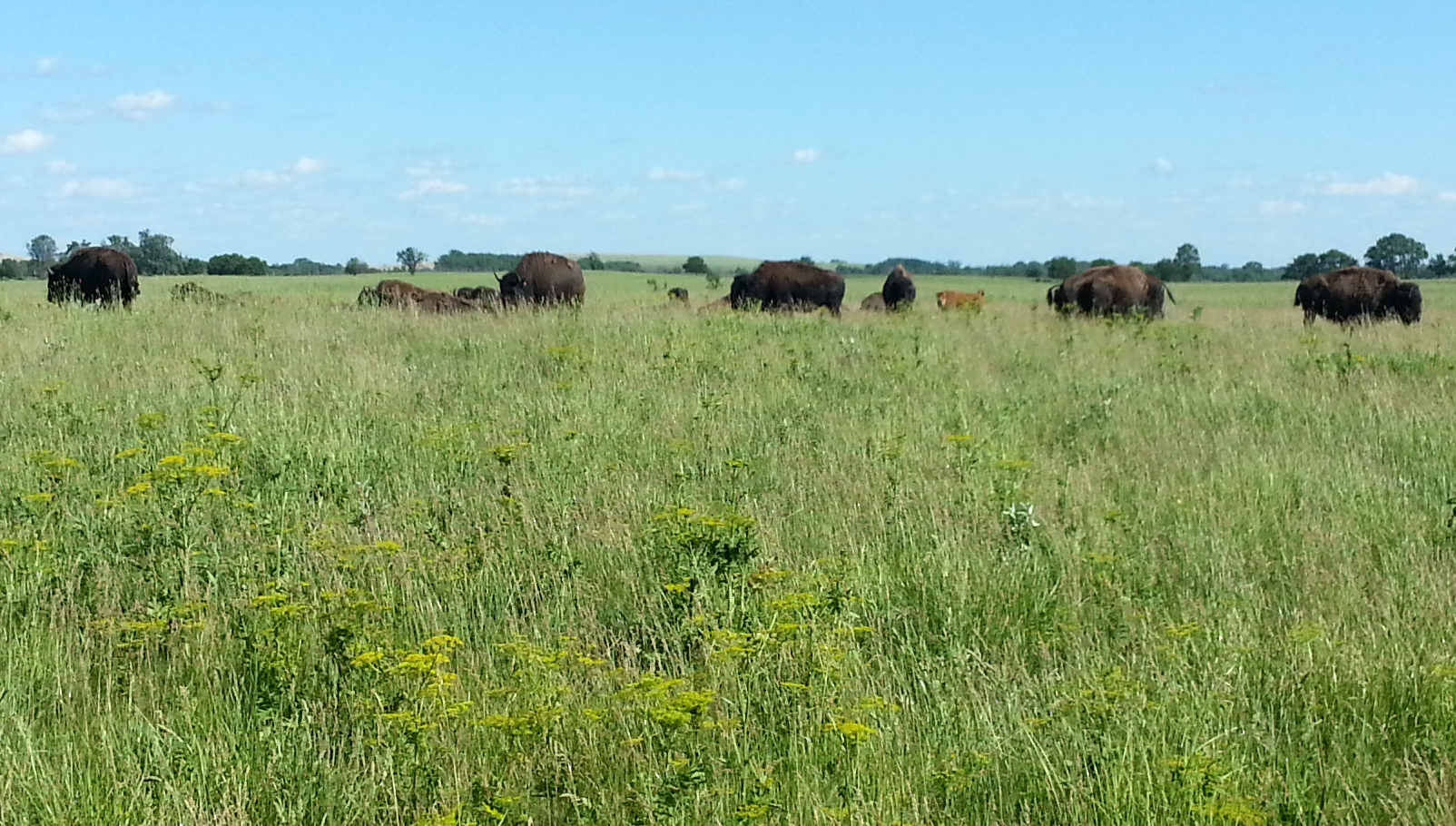
Bison at Midewin National Tallgrass Prairie in June 2016

In 2015, the prairie approved the use of 1,200 acres (490 ha) to establish a conservation herd of American bison. The 20-year plan will study the relationship between the historic large grazing animal, which almost became extinct, and prairie restoration and health. In October, a herd of 27 bison were introduced. Four bulls were transferred from the U.S. Department of Agriculture's Animal and Plant Health Inspection Service, Fort Collins, Colorado, and 23 cows were obtained from a ranch in Gann Valley, in Buffalo County, South Dakota. This was the first U.S. Forest Service project of its kind. By late spring 2017, births had increased the size of the herd to around 50.

== Access ==
After a period of ecological restoration, part of the prairie opened to visitors in 2004.

Today, over 7,000 acres (2,800 ha) of the reserve are open, with public trails for non-motorized recreation. The MNTP headquarters entrance and visitors center is located on Illinois Route 53, near the center of the preserve.

== See also ==
- Shortgrass prairie
- Tallgrass prairie
- United States National Grassland
- List of protected grasslands of North America
