= Areas of Concern =

Areas of Concern is a term used by regulatory bodies to refer to environmentally sensitive or damaged areas.

- Area of Critical Environmental Concern program managed by the United States Bureau of Land Management
- Great Lakes Areas of Concern managed under the Great Lakes Water Quality Agreement between the United States and Canada
