= Alliance for the Great Lakes =

American nonprofit organization

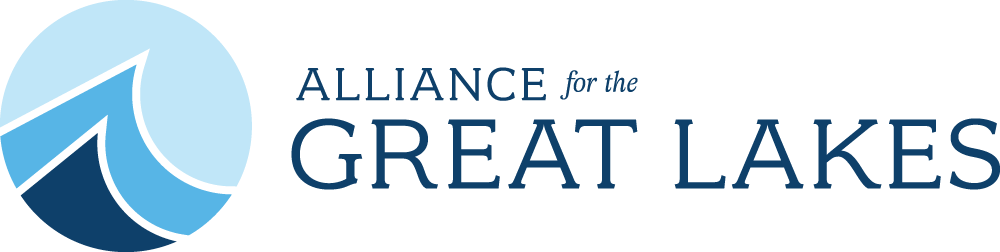
- Abbreviation: AGL
- Formation: 1970
- Type: Non-governmental organization
- Headquarters: Chicago, Illinois
- Region served: United States
- Website: www.greatlakes.org

Alliance for the Great Lakes is a nonprofit environmental organization formed to conserve and restore the freshwater resources of the Great Lakes through public engagement and policy promotion.

== Establishment ==
Motivated by nuclear power plants around Lake Michigan and threats to Indiana's sand dunes, an editor of Hyde Park Herald and Openlands Project staff member Lee Botts gathered activists from the four-state region at a conference on April 12, 1969. This was where the participants recommended forming an organization to propose policy solutions for Lake Michigan. During their second conference on May 2, 1970, the organizers announced the formation of the "Lake Michigan Federation," with its formal establishment announced that September. With support from the Chicago Community Trust, Wieboldt Foundation, and others, the group formed a board of directors from Illinois, Indiana, Michigan, and Wisconsin, with Lee Botts serving as the first executive director.

The Federation provided citizens with the capacity to monitor compliance with pollution discharge permits, challenged new and existing shoreline power plants, and lobbied for new pollution regulation. In 1971, the Lake Michigan Federation lobbied Chicago Mayor Richard J. Daley to ban phosphates in detergents to mitigate excessive algae growth.

== 1980 onward ==
The intervening years saw some contraction until the appointment of Glenda Daniel as executive director in 1986. During her tenure, the Lake Michigan Federation opened offices in Muskegon, Milwaukee, and Green Bay. With the U.S. and Canada signing a major amendment to the Great Lakes Water Quality Agreement in 1987, which allowed for the creation of "Areas of Concern" (AOCs), the Federation provided support for cleanups in these AOCs. After Daniel's resignation in 1992, the organization contracted, nearly disbanding.

In 1998, the board of directors appointed Cameron Davis to serve as its executive director. Having begun as a volunteer under Botts' tenure and serving as deputy director before leaving to work in environmental litigation, Davis returned to focus on expanding partnerships in various states, including bipartisan outreach to federal, state, and municipal elected officials. In 2003, the Alliance formed the Adopt-a-Beach program, a platform for volunteers to monitor and restore coastlines around the Great Lakes. In 2005, with a unanimous vote of the board of directors, the organization changed its name to the 'Alliance for the Great Lakes' and appointed Davis as its first President and CEO. In 2008, the Alliance received the American Bar Association's Distinguished Achievement Award in Environmental Law and Policy, becoming the first not-for-profit citizen's group to win the award. In 2009, President Barack Obama, who had once represented South Chicago's lakefront district as a state senator, appointed Davis to coordinate federal interdepartmental Great Lakes restoration work.

In December 2009, the board selected Joel Brammeier, the Alliance's vice president for policy, as president and CEO. In 2011, the Healing Our Waters-Great Lakes Coalition named Brammeier a co-chair, which consists of over 120 organization consortium and campaigned for the establishment of the Great Lakes Restoration Initiative. Brammeier has advocated for the re-separation of the Chicago Area Waterway System to protect the Great Lakes from invasive species such as Asian carp.

== Accomplishments ==
The alliance's reach has extended to Washington, D.C. In 1974, based on polychlorinated biphenyl's (PCB's) impact in the Great Lakes, the organization led efforts for Congress to ban the chemical through the Toxic Substances Control Act. In 1989, it initiated a lawsuit to prevent the illegal sale of the Lake Michigan lake bottom by the Illinois legislature to a prominent Chicago university. The case Lake Michigan Federation v. U.S. Army Corps of Engineers is a notable decision under the Public Trust Doctrine, which prohibits the sale of public Great Lakes resources to private entities.

In 2002 and again in 2008, the Alliance, under Davis' leadership, helped write and partnered with business interests and other environmental organizations to pass the Great Lakes Legacy Act, funding Area of Concern cleanups. The Legacy Act became the forerunner to the Great Lakes Restoration Initiative, demonstrating that multi-sector collaboration and bipartisan political partnerships could successfully secure large-scale congressional appropriations for ecosystem revitalization. The Alliance also played a key role in authoring and passing the Great Lakes Basin Water Resources Compact, setting water conservation standards, which was signed into law in 2008. Continuing to build its Adopt-a-Beach program, the Alliance emphasized the importance of citizens' involvement. The program now boasts over 10,000 volunteers annually and has initiated data-driven conservation efforts. Volunteers collect and use their own data to implement smoking bans at public beaches and inform decisions on microplastics from cosmetics, which have the potential to harm ecosystem health.
