= Prairie Ridge State Natural Area =

State park in Illinois, United States

- Interactive map of Prairie Ridge State Natural Area
- Location: Jasper County and Marion County, Illinois, U.S.
- Nearest city: Newton, Illinois
- Coordinates: 38°54′40″N 88°11′20″W
- Area: 4,101 acres (1,660 ha)
- Governing body: Illinois Department of Natural Resources

The Prairie Ridge State Natural Area is a 4,101-acre (1,660 ha) collaborative natural area managed by the Illinois Department of Natural Resources. It is managed for the benefit of endangered, threatened, watch list, and area sensitive species associated with the tallgrass prairie habitat of south-central Illinois, especially the greater prairie chicken. The natural area is split between land parcels in Jasper County and Marion County, in the U.S. state of Illinois.

== History and description ==
Predecessor activity to the setup of the State Natural Area (SNA) began in 1912 when state game managers counted what was then a widespread population of greater prairie chickens within Illinois. Changes in agricultural technology, particularly the development of fertilizer chemistry, sharply reduced the economic viability of grassland in Illinois and led to the plow-up of most of the remaining parcels of tallgrass prairie. After the Illinois greater prairie chicken population dropped to 25,000 in 1933 the hunting season was permanently closed, but this did not halt the decline. Conservation areas were purchased and set aside in 1939–1944, but the birds died out in these Northern Illinois parcels anyway. This created an incentive for the private sector to purchase grassland parcels in southern Illinois. These land purchases, which took place starting in 1961, acquired the land that now forms the Prairie Ridge SNA. As of 2014, the most recent land acquisition took place in 2001.

The Prairie Ridge SNA today consists of public-sector and private-sector land managed for greater prairie chickens; as of 2014, it contains the final breeding populations of this species (which once numbered in excess of 10 million birds in Illinois) within the 'Prairie State.' A high-quality quarter-section of land (160-acre (65 ha)), the Robert Ridgway Nature Preserve, remains within the ownership of the Illinois Audubon Society, with most of the parcels of land within Prairie Ridge now owned by the state of Illinois. The State Natural Area is scattered, with at least seventeen separate noncontiguous parcels of land designated within the area. The Jasper County parcels center on grasslands south and west of Newton, while the Marion County tracts are scattered around the town of Kinmundy.

Approximately 250 species of birds have been recorded at the Prairie Ridge State Natural Area, of which 16 are state endangered species and eight are state threatened species. The IDNR manages the State Natural Area with the hope of re-establishing, or maintaining, breeding populations of greater prairie chickens, Henslow's sparrows, loggerhead shrikes, northern harriers, short-eared owls, upland sandpipers, and other endangered or threatened species with a biological tie to grassland ecosystems. In some cases, the Illinois populations of these birds have continued to decline despite the creation of the SNA.

== Expansion ==
In 2025, an additional 80 acres near Prairie Ridge were purchased by the Illinois chapter of the Audubon Society. The property will be converted from farmland to prairie habitat.
