= Beauty Turner =

American journalist

- Born: Beauty B. Turner; January 23, 1957; Chicago, Illinois, U.S.
- Died: December 18, 2008 (aged 51); Chicago, Illinois, U.S.
- Occupations: Activist; journalist
- Known for: Activism on behalf of public housing residents in Chicago; Ghetto Bus Tours

Beauty B. Turner (October 23, 1957 – December 18, 2008) was an American housing activist and journalist from Chicago, Illinois. At the time of her death, Turner was compared to the civil rights leader Ida B. Wells.

== Biography ==
=== Career ===
Turner was well known for her GHETTO (Greatest History Ever Told To Our People) Bus Tours, which toured different Chicago Housing Authority complexes to spotlight the experience of residents. Turner was associate editor of Chicago (South) Street Journal and Residents' Journal, as well as a columnist for the Hyde Park Herald, the Lakefront Outlook and a number of other local newspapers. For sixteen years, Turner was a resident of the Robert Taylor Homes, one of the US's best known public housing projects. Towards the end of her career, Turner worked as a research assistant for Professor Sudhir Venkatesh, a sociologist at Columbia University. Her writings have appeared on the front page of The Wall Street Journal.

=== Awards and honors ===
Turner won a number of awards through her career as a journalist, which include:

- First New America Award by the National Society of Professional Journalists
- Winner of a Studs Terkel
- Peter Lisagor
- Associated Press award
- Chicago Association for Black Journalist award
- Courageous voice award for her community activism
- Black Pearl award
- Woman of the Century award
- Shero award from the Empowerment Zone Committee

== Personal life and death ==
Turner had three children (two sons and a daughter); Larry Turner (born 1975), Landon (born 1980) and LaTanya Turner (Taylor) (born in 1977). Turner's grandson is Reezy Turner.

Turner died on December 18, 2008, at the age of 51. She developed an aneurysm, fell into a coma, and never recovered. She died at Rush University Medical Center.
