= Adams Wildlife Sanctuary =

Margery Adams Wildlife Sanctuary
- Location within Illinois
- Location: Springfield, Illinois
- Coordinates: 39.8031°N 89.6189°W
- Area: 40 acres (16 ha)
- Established: 1983

The Margery Adams Wildlife Sanctuary, usually called the Adams Wildlife Sanctuary, is a 40-acre (0.16 km^{2}) headquarters building and land parcel owned and managed by the Illinois Audubon Society. Its second-growth forest land and restored tallgrass prairie are managed so as to maximize the diversity of the urban wildlife that visits the property. It is named after Margery Adams who donated the property to the society.

== History ==
A four-room wooden house was built here in 1857. Early Springfield citizen L.B. Adams purchased the house and a surrounding 28-acre (0.11 km^{2}) parcel of property, the ancestor of today's Sanctuary, in 1869. The Adams family lived in the home and utilized much of the parcel as a fruit orchard. After being passed through two generations, the parcel was bequeathed to its final individual owner, Adams's granddaughter Margery Adams (1897-1983), who allowed the orchard to progressively revert into second-growth woodland.

After using the parcel throughout her life as her private home, Margery Adams bequeathed the home and property to the Illinois Audubon Society with the request that the Society occupy and maintain the property as a private wildlife refuge. The Society implemented a capital program to expand and renovate Adams's historic house as a headquarters and meeting center in 2008. A donation added 12 additional acres to the property. As of 2020, some invasive plants are being removed and the grounds are being restored to serve as a bird and wildlife sanctuary.

The wooded portion of the Wildlife Sanctuary features cottonwood, hackberry, silver maple, shingle oak, and black walnut. Ornithologists have identified 81 different species of birds. The sanctuary and its trails are free and open to the public.

The sanctuary is located at 2315 Clear Lake Avenue, Springfield, Illinois.

== See also ==
- Abraham Lincoln Memorial Garden
- Washington Park (Springfield, Illinois)
