= South Side Weekly =

Newspaper in Chicago

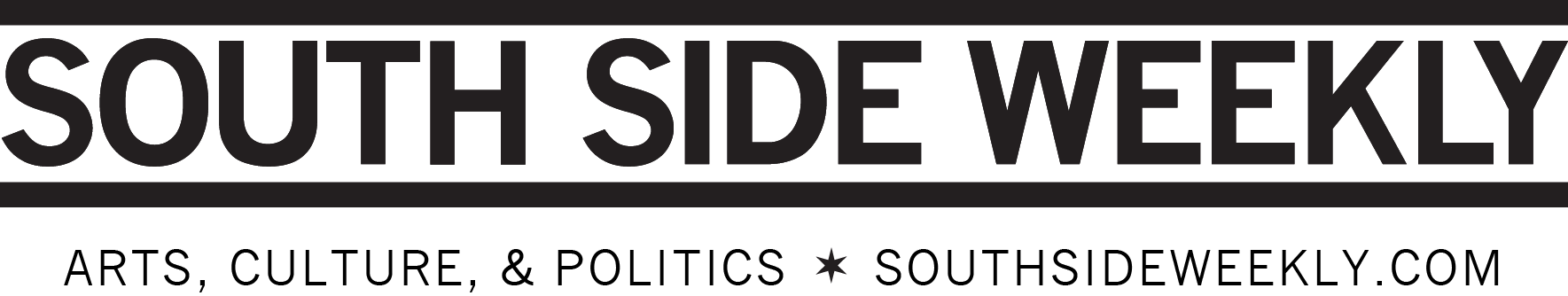
- Type: community newspaper
- Format: Tabloid
- Owner: South Side Media Works
- Editor: Jill Petty
- Founded: 1995 as Chicago Weekly News
- Headquarters: Woodlawn; Chicago, Illinois, U.S.
- Sister newspapers: Hyde Park Herald
- Website: southsideweekly.com

The South Side Weekly, previously known as the Chicago Weekly News and Chicago Weekly, is an American alternative newspaper based in Woodlawn on the South Side of Chicago. The publication covers arts, culture, news and politics. In 2023, the Weekly launched an investigations hub that produces investigative reports and offers trainings on public-records requests.

The Weekly publishes stories online and in a biweekly print edition that is distributed across the South Side and Chicago .

== History ==
=== Chicago Weekly News (1995–2002) ===
The paper was established in 1995 under the Chicago Weekly News, produced by an all-volunteer editorial staff, composed largely of University of Chicago students. The paper closed operations in the winter of 2002.

=== Chicago Weekly; partnership with Newcity (2003–2013) ===
A newly branded Chicago Weekly resumed operations in 2003, as a result of a co-publishing partnership with university alumni-founded Newcity. Under this new partnership, a copy of Newcity would come inserted in the middle of each Chicago Weekly issue.

=== South Side Weekly (2013–present) ===
In 2013, the Chicago Weekly staff changed the name of the organization and newspaper to the South Side Weekly, and began publishing independently of Newcity.

Jackie Serrato was editor in chief from 2019 to 2025. During her tenure, the Weekly merged with the Hyde Park Herald. Longtime managing editor Adam Przybyl was interim editor in chief for five months following Serrato's departure. In March 2025, the Weekly's board of directors selected board chair Jill Petty as editor in chief.

== Content ==
The paper is distributed throughout the South Side of Chicago and reports on news relevant to the South Side and the city at large. The newspaper includes features, news, and investigations, arts and music coverage.

== Best of the South Side ==
The South Side Weekly produces an annual showcase issue of the South Side's various neighborhoods called Best of the South Side.
