= Hyde Park Herald =

Weekly newspaper that serves the Hyde Park neighborhood of Chicago, Illinois

- Hyde Park Herald logo
- Type: Weekly newspaper
- Format: Berliner
- Owner: South Side Media Works
- Publisher: Jianan Shi (interim)
- Editor: Hannah Faris
- Founded: 1882; 144 years ago
- Headquarters: 6100 S. Blackstone Ave., Chicago, IL 60615
- Circulation: 3,700
- Website: hpherald.com

The Hyde Park Herald is a weekly newspaper that serves the Hyde Park neighborhood of Chicago, Illinois.

== Overview ==
The newspaper was founded in 1882. For the Herald's first seven years, it was a suburban newspaper covering affairs in an independent unit of local government; after Hyde Park was annexed by Chicago in 1889, the Herald evolved into its current status as an urban neighborhood newspaper.

The Herald covers local business, retail, politics, real estate and housing, the University of Chicago, sports, K–12 education and local Chicago Public Schools, parks (including the Barack Obama Presidential Center), crime, obituaries and fire. Freelancers provide photography and arts coverage.

In 2006, Herald sister publication Lakefront Outlook won the George Polk Award.

In 2026, the newspaper was awarded two Peter Lisagor Awards from the Chicago Headline Club for theater criticism and sports reporting.

== Key people ==
The longtime owner of the Hyde Park Herald was Bruce Sagan. He is father of Paul Sagan, the former CEO of Akamai Technologies. In July 2018, Sagan named Randall Weissman the publisher. In 2022, the Hyde Park Herald merged with South Side Weekly NFP - a nonprofit newsroom dedicated to producing local journalism that is for, by, and about the South Side of Chicago.

Future Washington Post columnist David Broder wrote for the Herald while working toward his master's degree from 1947 to 1951. Lee Botts, a prominent Great Lakes environmentalist and a senior official in the administration of President Jimmy Carter, was editor of the Herald in the late 1960s. Democratic political consultant David Axelrod wrote for the paper while a student at the University of Chicago in the 1970s. Beauty Turner, a housing activist, was one of the paper's columnists.
