= Environmentally Concerned Citizens of South Central Michigan =

U.S. nonprofit organization

- Abbreviation: ECCSCM
- Type: Nonprofit
- Tax ID no.: 30-0216242
- Legal status: 501(c)(3)
- Headquarters: Hudson, Michigan
- Website: https://nocafos.org/

Environmentally Concerned Citizens of South Central Michigan (ECCSCM) is an association of citizens in Michigan, who are concerned about the consequences of concentrated animal feeding operations (CAFOs). The ECCSCM is located in the Western Lake Erie Watershed.

The association's aim is to educate the public on the health risks and the environmental damage (such as air and water pollution) of CAFOs. They also promote sustainable alternatives (such as eating local food, pasture-based meat, eggs and dairy). ECCSCM is concerned about the area's drinking water, the risk of liquid manure systems, which might drain to field tiles, which drain to streams and then finally flow to Lake Erie. ECCSCM claims that CAFOs in this area are violating Michigan's Water Quality Standards. The organization also monitors and reports illegal activities of CAFOs.

Lynn Henning, who won the Goldman Environmental Prize for her fight against CAFOs, had a leading role in the formation of the ECCSCM.
