= Redneck Fishing Tournament =

Annual fishing event on Illinois River

- Status: Active
- Genre: Fishing tournament
- Frequency: Annually in August
- Location: Bath, Illinois
- Inaugurated: 2005
- Founder: Betty DeFord
- Most recent: August 3-5, 2023
- Website: www.originalredneckfishintournament.com

The Redneck Fishing Tournament is an annual carp fishing event held on a channel of the Illinois River near the community of Bath, Illinois. The event is typically held during the first weekend in August and is specifically intended to decrease the population of silver carp (Hypophthalmichthys molitrix), a prolific species of Asian carp, in the river. Different to other fishing tournaments where angling is the predominant technique, Redneck Fishing Tournament participants use dip nets to catch fish jumping out of water.

Silver carp is a notorious invasive species in the midwestern United States and has become a nuisance pest in various waterways of the Mississippi Basin over the last twenty years, competing for food with native fish. The fish can weigh around forty pounds (18 kg) as mature adults, and their flesh is typically more bony than those fish species that are usually consumed by the average American, thus causing the fish to be unpopularly seen as a trash fish in North America (despite being a staple food fish in their native Asia). Their large size is of particular note, because the fish are easily startled vibrations from motorboats move through water and subsequently respond by jumping high out of the water, potentially hitting and injuring boaters.

== History ==
Silver carp were among several species imported to the United States, notably to Arkansas, in the 1970s as a way to reduce algae in commercial fishing ponds. Flooding events along the Mississippi River and its tributaries during the 1980s are commonly considered to have been what allowed the fish to escape those commercial ponds and make their way into rivers, other ponds, and lakes.

The first officially recognized event was held in 2005 and attracted an estimated two hundred participants. Media attention grew, bringing in more participants the following year. Participants in the tournament have come from as far away as Europe and Asia. Participants in the tournament board boats and travel the river for two hours at a time, using various types of fishing nets to catch the fish as they jump out of the water. No fishing poles are allowed in the tournament, and releasing any fish that are caught back into the river is prohibited. The fish that are caught during the tournament are used for various purposes ranging from scientific research to ingredients in fertilizer and cat food, to, in some cases, human consumption.

The 2018 tournament resulted in over 5,300 fish being removed from the river, while previous tournaments have caught as many as 10,600.

In recent years, proceeds from the event have been donated to charities in the area.

Because of flooding & the COVID-19 pandemic, the tournament was on hiatus until 2021.
