= Illinois Audubon Society =

Nonprofit organization in Illinois, US

- Formation: 1897
- Type: Non-profit organization
- Tax ID no.: 36-6065870
- Legal status: 501(c)(3)
- Purpose: to promote the perpetuation and appreciation of native flora and fauna of Illinois and the habitats that support them.
- Headquarters: Springfield, Illinois
- Coordinates: 39.804455°N 89.619179°W
- Region served: Illinois
- Executive Director: Jo Fessett
- Main organ: Board of Directors
- Website: illinoisaudubon.org

The Illinois Audubon Society is a nonprofit organization based in Springfield, Illinois. Its mission statement states that the Society intends to "promote the perpetuation and appreciation of native plants and animals and the habitats that support them."

== Description and history ==
The Illinois Audubon Society was founded in April 1897 and is Illinois' oldest non-profit independent conservation organization. As of 2017, it has 18 chapters throughout Illinois. Its executive offices are located at the Adams Wildlife Sanctuary, an Illinois Audubon Society-managed sanctuary on the east side of Springfield.

The Society specializes in organizing volunteer work to foster the appreciation and upkeep of managed habitat space throughout Illinois. Society properties included prairie chicken habitat grassland managed as part of the Prairie Ridge State Natural Area in southern Illinois.

== Sanctuaries ==
- Adams Wildlife Sanctuary - 40 acres, Springfield
- Amboy Marsh Nature Preserve - 302 acres, Lee County
- Gremel Wildlife Sanctuary
- Helen & Betty Bremer Wildlife Sanctuary - Hillsboro
- Graber Grasslands Land & Water Reserve - located within the Prairie Ridge State Natural Area
- Hartman Springs Nature Preserve
- Hoberg Tract
- Merrill Sanctuary
- Plum Island Eagle Sanctuary - 52 acres, LaSalle County
- Karcher's Post Oak Woods Nature Preserve
- Karl Bartel Grasslands Land & Water Reserve
- War Bluff Valley Sanctuary - Pope County
