= Great Lakes Areas of Concern =

Geographical region in the Great Lakes that show environmental degradation

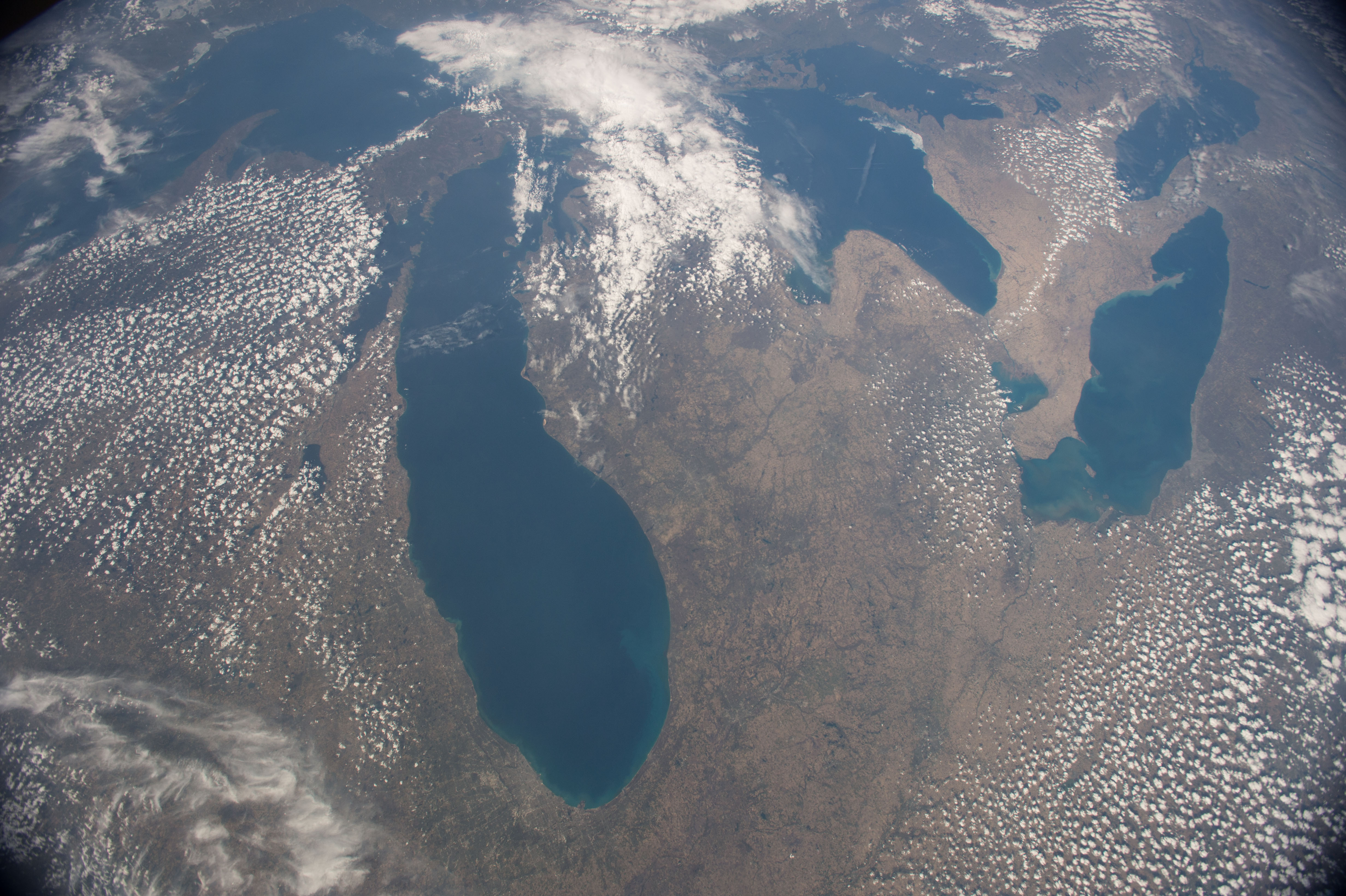
The Great Lakes from space

Great Lakes Areas of Concern are designated geographic areas within the Great Lakes Basin that show severe environmental degradation. There are a total of 43 areas of concern within the Great Lakes, 26 being in the United States, 12 in Canada, and five shared by the two countries.

The Great Lakes, the largest system of fresh water lakes in the world, are shared by the United States and Canada. They make up 95% of the surface freshwater in the contiguous United States and have 10,000 miles of coastline (including connecting channels, mainland and islands)—more than the contiguous United States' Pacific and Atlantic coastlines combined. The lakes are a system of transport and shipping, as well as a place of recreation.

== Description of an area of concern ==
An area of concern must have at least "one beneficial use impairment which means that it has undergone a change in its chemical, physical, or biological integrity of a water body." These include:

- restrictions on fish and wildlife consumption
- tainting of fish and wildlife flavor
- degradation of fish and wildlife populations
- fish tumors or other deformities
- bird or animal deformities or reproduction problems
- degradation of benthos
- restrictions on dredging activities
- eutrophication or undesirable algae
- drinking water restrictions, or taste and odor problems
- beach closings
- degradation of aesthetics
- added costs to agriculture or industry
- degradation of phytoplankton and zooplankton
- loss of fish and wildlife habitat

== The Great Lakes Water Quality Agreement ==
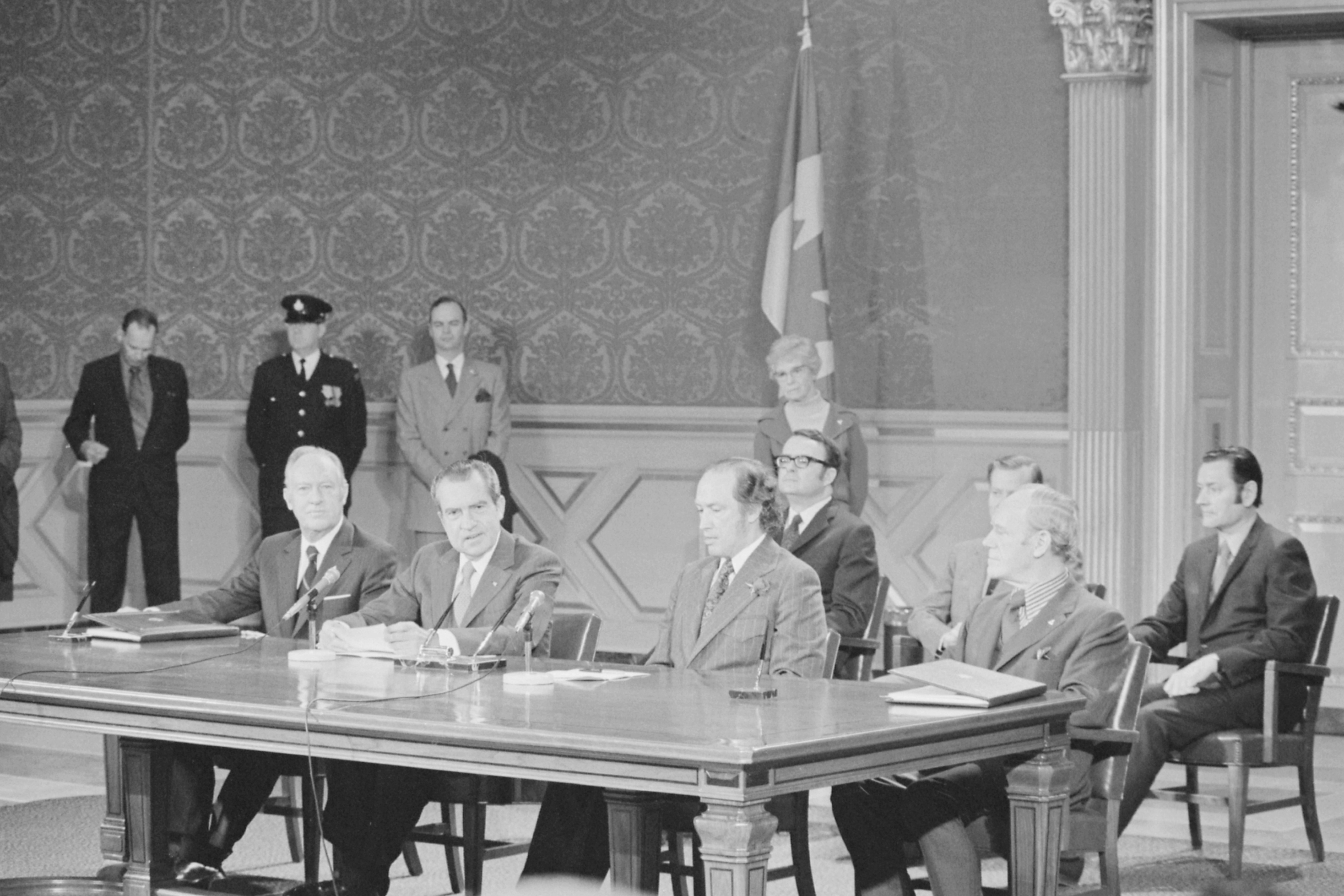
President Richard Nixon and Prime Minister Pierre Trudeau at the signing ceremony for the Great Lakes Water Quality Agreement in 1972

The Great Lakes Water Quality Agreement (GLWQA) between the United States and Canada more specifically defines Areas of Concern as "geographic areas that fail to meet the general or specific objectives of the agreement where such failure has caused or is likely to cause impairment of beneficial use of the area's ability to support aquatic life." The U.S.-Canada Water Quality Agreement holds the committee and regulations that decide whether an area should be considered an area of concern. The goal of the agreement is to restore and maintain the chemical, physical and biological integrity of the Great Lakes Basin ecosystem through a concerted set of interventions that are targeted at the aforementioned Areas of Concern. Because each waterway has a unique set of characteristics that have contributed to its ecological impairment, a Remedial Action Plan has been developed to identify the causes of impairment which will be used to guide local actions that will restore the individual waterways. The goal of each Remedial Action Plan is to bring about the delisting of the waterway from the list of Areas of Concern

Since its original passage in 1972, the GLWQA has been amended multiple times to include preventative action towards current anthropogenic stressors. In particular, the latest amendment to the agreement was in 2012 where preventative measures were added to address issues that have arisen since the last amendment in 1987. Furthermore, this amendment resulted in the invitation of additional organizations to participate in policy formation and remediation. Primarily run by the U.S. Environmental Protection Agency and Environment and Climate Change Canada, the Great Lakes Committee Members have added indigenous representatives and local public government organizations. Thus, any form of remedial action takes into account the local communities’ perspectives. This governing body is also known as the Binational Executive Committee (BEC), which meets at least twice a year to establish priorities and review progress. Under the GLWQA, various action plans have been established to target specific lakes. For example, the 2012 amendment resulted in the creation of GLWQA Nutrients Annex Subcommittee that will help target the algal bloom in Lake Erie. Overall, the General Lakes Water Agreement is a dynamic piece of legislature that will continue to address ever-changing priorities and values.

== Other laws and policies ==
The United States and Canada and the states that border the Great Lakes have all created several laws, policies, and commissions to try to keep the Great Lakes healthy and un-polluted. In 1909, the Boundary Waters Treaty was put into place to control the water quality in the Boundary Waters that border both the U.S. and Canada. They created the International Joint Commission to deal with the duties of the new treaty. With the realization of the sea lamprey explosion in the Great Lakes, the Great Lakes Fishery Commission was created to control the situation. In 1994, the Ecosystem Charter for the Great Lakes- St. Lawrence Basin was suggested as a good faith agreement. This was an agreement to use the ecosystem as a method of management for the Great Lakes. The Air Quality Agreement was put into place to help protect the health of not only the ecosystems of the Great Lakes but the citizens who live around them as well. It limits the amount of toxic chemicals that are given off. Another policy that was put into place in response to the toxic chemicals in the area of the Great Lakes occurred in 1997. The Great Lakes Binational Toxics Strategy was developed to control the persistent toxic substances that bioaccumulate such as DDT, PCBs, mercury and dioxins. These toxins stay in ecosystems for long after they are exposed and they can cause serious damage to the plant and animal life."

== Threats ==
=== Invasive species ===
One of the major problems is the number of non-native species that are taking over the lakes. Approximately every eight months a new species enters the Great Lakes, severely disrupting the ecosystems in the area. New animals or insects coming into or leaving an ecosystem can be just as damaging as pollution.

A major food source for most fish in Lake Michigan had been Diporeia shrimp that have been drastically decreased by an infestation of zebra mussels. The Diporeia shrimp have declined from over 10,000 per square meter to virtually zero on the lake bottom because of these zebra mussels. In Lake Michigan the decrease in Diporeia numbers is extreme at 94% killed over the past ten years. Its neighbor, Lake Huron is down 57% in its Diporeia population in just the past three years. There are many examples of this problem in each of the Great Lakes, as well.

The Great Lakes have been damaged by more than 180 invasive and non-native species. Some of these species include the zebra mussel, quagga mussel, round goby, sea lamprey, and alewife. Invasive plants include purple loosestrife and Eurasian watermilfoil. As well as throwing off the habitats of native species and the food web of the ecosystem, invasive species also threaten human health and have a major negative impact on the Great Lakes economy by damaging fisheries, agricultural industries, and tourism.

=== Point-source pollution ===
Point-source pollution occurs when pollutants enter a waterway directly. This could be from such causes as municipal sewage or industrial wastewater discharged into waterways. Prior to enactment of the 1972 Clean Water Act in the US and similar laws in Canada, cities and towns, industries, farms and other facilities discharged wastewater into lakes, rivers and other waterways, due to the belief that dilution in the receiving water body would mitigate any potential harm. More recent studies have shown that the dilution theory was often incorrect. After many years of constant dumping, many waterways became contaminated with chemicals, mining waste and human waste.

=== Nonpoint-source pollution ===
Nonpoint source pollution is pollution that occurs when runoff from streets, lawns, farms, and other areas carries toxins, chemicals, and eroded soil into nearby lakes, rivers, and oceans causing pollution and buildup of sediment. Nonpoint source pollution is said to be the most problematic and hardest to reverse of the types of pollution because it is so hard to regulate and pinpoint where it originates. Many experts agree that nonpoint source pollution is the biggest concern facing the Great Lakes. With the increase of urbanization, a toll has been taken on the lakes in these areas. Lakes that once had stable ecosystems with the appropriate amount of plant life are now full of massive amounts of plants and algae that have been fed by excess fertilizer from lawns and farms, killing off many species of fish and other water life.

=== Atmospheric pollution ===
Atmospheric pollution is pollution that falls from the sky and comes to rest back on earth in the water table and in the lakes, rivers and oceans. Sources of this type of air pollution are smoke stacks at power plants and factories, as well as cars, trucks, other motor vehicles and stationary engines that burn fossil fuels. Atmospheric pollution usually falls hundreds of miles away from its source and therefore is difficult to track and locate, but it is a major contributor to pollution in the Great Lakes and water bodies across the world. Air pollution emitted in one country can have impacts in other countries. Acid rain, a significant type of atmospheric pollution, is caused by a chemical reaction that begins when compounds such as sulfur dioxide and nitrogen oxides are released into the atmosphere. These substances rise very high into the air, mix with and react with water, oxygen, and other chemicals to create acid rain pollution. The effects of acid rain are mostly seen in aquatic ecosystems. As the rain flows through the soil, the acidic water can drain away aluminum from the soil and them flow into streams and lakes. As more acid is released into the environment, more aluminum is also released. There are some plants and animals that are able to tolerate acid rain and moderate amounts of aluminum, but others are not as tolerant and will start to die off as the pH decreases. One of the biggest contributors to acid rain is the burning of coal and other fossil fuels.

== List of areas of concern ==
Lake Superior

- Peninsula Harbor
- Jackfish Bay
- Nipigon Bay
- Thunder Bay
- Saint Louis River
- Deer Lake-Carp Creek River
- Torch Lake

Lake Erie

- Maumee River
- Black River
- River Raisin
- Cuyahoga River
- Wheatley Harbour
- Ashtabula River
- Presque Isle Bay
- Buffalo River

Lake Michigan

- Manistique River
- Menominee River
- Fox River – Southern Green Bay
- Sheboygan River
- Milwaukee Estuary
- Waukegan Harbor
- Grand Calumet River
- Kalamazoo River
- Muskegon Lake
- White Lake

Lake Huron

- Spanish Harbor
- Severn Sound
- Collingwood Harbour
- Saginaw River and Bay

Lake Ontario

- Oswego River
- Rochester Embayment
- Eighteen Mile Creek
- Hamilton Harbour
- Metro Toronto
- Port Hope Harbour
- Bay of Quinte

Connecting channels

- Saint Marys River
- St. Clair River
- Clinton River
- Detroit River
- Rouge River
- Niagara River
- Saint Lawrence River

As of August 2021, 11 former areas of concern have been fully restored and delisted. These include:

- Oswego River (2006)
- Presque Isle Bay (2013)
- Deer Lake (2014)
- White Lake (2014)
- Lower Menominee (2020)
- Ashtabula River (2021)
- Rochester Embayment (2024)
- Muskegon Lake (2025)
- Collingwood Harbour (1994)
- Severn Sound (2002)
- Wheatley Harbour (2010)

Additionally, eight areas of concern in the United States and two in Canada have completed restoration efforts and are awaiting final delisting.

== See also ==
- Clean Water Act
- Environmentally Concerned Citizens of South Central Michigan (ECCSCM)
- Lists of invasive species
- Water pollution
