= Illinois Nature Preserves Commission =

U.S. state organization

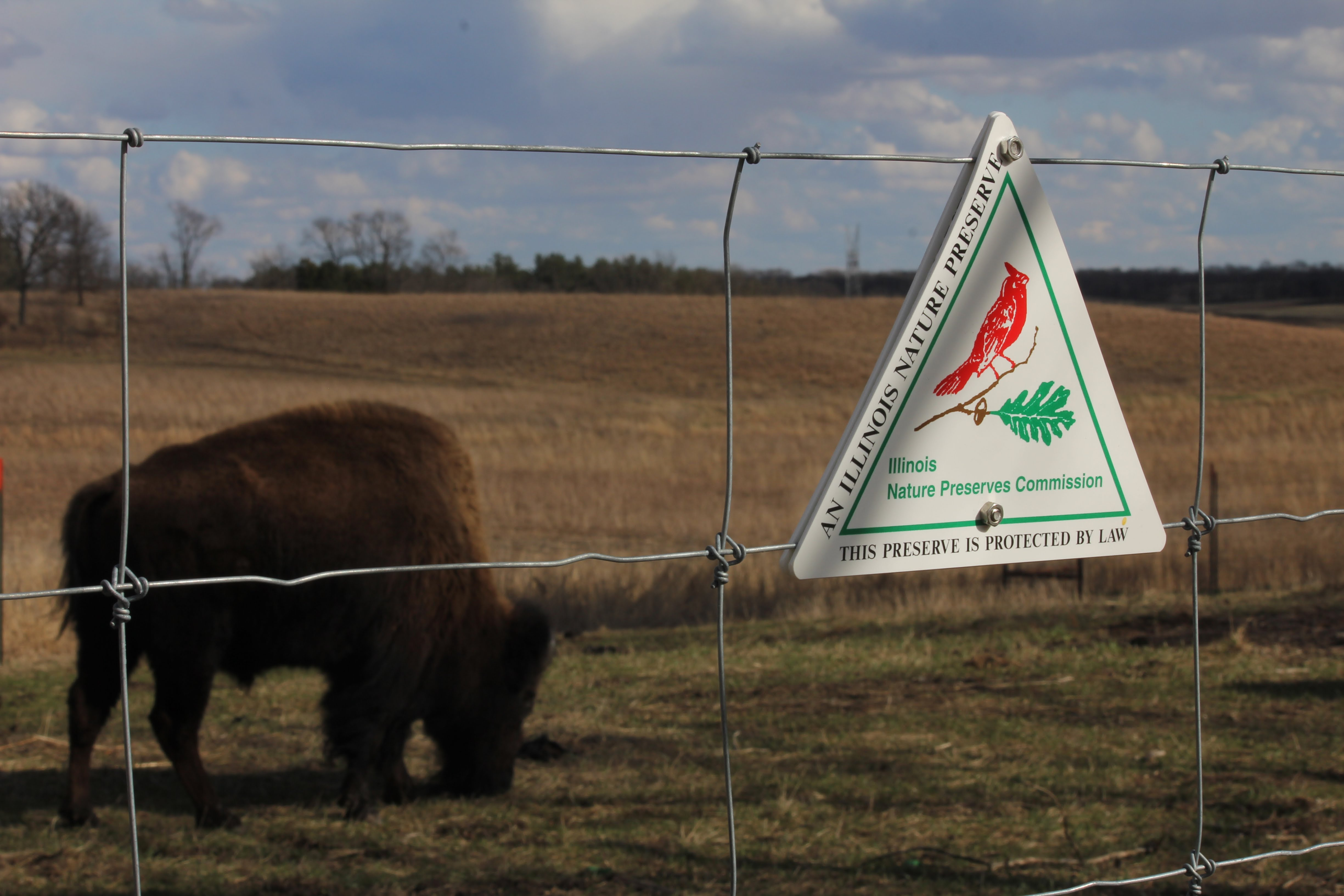
Illinois Nature Preserve sign at Nachusa Grasslands

The Illinois Nature Preserves Commission (INPC) is a state organization, established by the Illinois Natural Areas Preservation Act, to identify, protect, steward, and defend high quality natural areas in the state of Illinois. Its mission is:

to assist private and public landowners in protecting high quality natural areas and habitats of endangered and threatened species; in perpetuity, through voluntary dedication or registration of such lands into the Illinois Nature Preserves System. The Commission promotes the preservation of these significant lands and provides leadership in their stewardship, management and protection.

Eligible land, public or private, may be permanently dedicated as an Illinois Nature Preserve—the strongest level of protection—or it may be registered (permanently or temporarily) as an Illinois Land and Water Reserve or a Natural Heritage Landmark.

The INPC comprises a volunteer board of commissioners that works with staff, landowners, and other stakeholders. Funding for INPC staff comes from the Illinois Department of Natural Resources (IDNR) and the Natural Areas Acquisition Fund. In 2022, Todd Strole was hired as the Executive Director of INPC. Prior to IDNR hiring Strole, the position of Director had been vacant for seven years.

In 2020, a nonprofit organization, Friends of Illinois Nature Preserves, was created to support INPC and habitat conservation within nature preserves.
