= Chicago Wilderness Alliance =

- Founded: 1996
- Type: Non-governmental organization
- Purpose: conservation, environmental education, sustainability
- Location: Chicago
- Region served: Chicagoland
- Website: www.chicagowilderness.org

Chicago Wilderness Alliance is a regional alliance of more than 250 different organizations that work together to improve the quality of life of the individuals and the many other species living in the Chicago (Illinois) area. Through the restoration and sustenation of the biological diversity that once encompassed the lands, their fundamental objective, to preserve the naturally occurring lands and waters in that region, is being made a reality. Through these activities, Chicago Wilderness played a major role in protecting and replenishing the naturally occurring ecosystems in the Chicago area as well as motivating people to become more aware and involved in the preservation of these lands and waters. Chicago Wilderness had continued to blossom through the funding and donations of many sources including private contributions, the member organizations, and state and federal grants.

== History ==
In the 1970s the Illinois Natural Areas Inventory selected the best quality surviving natural habitats within the state. All of these areas combined constituted seven-hundredths of one percent of the original land mass it once covered. Due to this dramatic decrease of naturally occurring ecosystems, the Chicago Region Biodiversity Council, or Chicago Wilderness, was formed in 1996. This collection of 34 separate organizations, including state, local, and federal agencies, joined forces as they all shared a common vision consisting of the restoration and improvement of the biodiversity of the Chicago area. In 2002, Chicago Wilderness established its Corporate Council. The Corporate Council, which includes 34 organizations, was created to influence a healthy relationship between people and nature and to continue to increase the biological diversity within the region. Since it was established, Chicago Wilderness has increased its member count to over 250 different public and private organizations who work together to conserve and protect these diminishing ecosystems.

On March 29, 2017, the leadership of Chicago Wilderness announced that the Chicago Wilderness Trust would be ceasing operations effective March 31. This message stated that its Chair and Vice Chair, and their alliance partner organizations, were "committed to working with the Executive Council and other alliance members to determine the best strategy for moving forward". In a June 5, 2017 email from the Chair and Vice-Chair, a "Status Report" was provided about the progress of an Ad Hoc Transition Working Group transitioning the organization from a staffed one to a volunteer-driven effort.

== Land Area ==
Chicago Wilderness stretches from southwest Michigan, to northwest Indiana, reaching through northern Illinois, and southern Wisconsin. It is home to a variety of ecosystems sustaining life to thousands of native plants and animal species, including almost 200 listed endangered or threatened species in Illinois. The various ecological communities contain: prairies, woodlands, including savannas, open woodlands, flatwoods and forests, wetlands, which encompass marshes, sedge meadows, bogs, seeps, springs and swamps, rivers and lakes.

== The Four Main Initiatives ==
Chicago Wilderness has four major initiatives it strives to improve through its presence: Climate Change, Green Infrastructure Vision: Bringing Nature to People, Leave No Child Inside, and Restoring the Health of Local Nature. Included in these core projects, the Chicago Wilderness alliance encompasses a variety of other programs to benefit the members of the community as well as the land they are preserving.

=== Climate Change ===
The climate change initiative of Chicago Wilderness focuses primarily on addressing the effects of climate change on the Chicago wilderness region and ways to respond to these changes. Studies have shown the impact of climate change has on the world, but little is known about how it affects specific regions. Recently, both Chicago Wilderness and the Nature Conservancy published reports to address the issues the area faces as the climate changes, both from the perspective of the city and the region's wildlife. In addition to the reports, the Chicago Wilderness Alliance also developed the Climate Action Plan for Nature, which has established plans for the city of Chicago (Chicago Climate Action Plan), the city of Evanston, and the University of Illinois. The Climate Action Plan has five strategies it is currently working on: Energy efficient buildings, clean and renewable energy sources, improved transportation options, reduce waste and industrial pollution, and finally adaption. Green-covered roofs on some of Chicago's buildings are key features of projects implemented as part of their climate action plan.

=== Green Infrastructure Vision ===
As according to Chicago wilderness, Green Infrastructure is defined as "the interconnected network of land and water that supports biodiversity and provides habitat for diverse communities of native flora and fauna at the regional scale." The Green Infrastructure Vision (GIV) was proposed in 2004. Its main purpose is to create a healthy region that plays a role in the quality of life of residents, to increase the economic liveliness of the region and to bring the nature to the people by protecting, preserving, restoring and managing biodiversity. There are 1.8 million acres that are potential areas of expansion, protection, restoration and connection for the GIV in Southwest Wisconsin, Northeast Illinois, Northwest Indiana, and Southwest Michigan.

Chicago wilderness works to put the green infrastructure vision into action by focusing on four main scales: Regional, Community, Neighborhood and Site. At a regional level, CW members work with regional agencies. By looking at future plans and policies, they can focus on including conservation developmental and preservation principles that promote and sustain community health. In the community, land use ordinances and plans will be reworked to enhance people friendly design, while integrating such principles as sustainability, biodiversity and conservation. GIV works at a neighborhood level to further promotion of conservation, preservation and access to nature in communities. At a more specific level, they work with specific sites to encourage use of rain gardens, rain barrels (also known as rainwater tanks), and natural landscaping in open spaces in the community. The GIV put forward SWAT (Sustainable Watershed Action Team) as a response to Northeastern Illinois request for aid in basic infrastructure planning and sustainable developmental practices because of the wide-range developmental altercations arising. SWAT focuses at the scale of neighborhoods and communities.

=== Leave No Child Inside ===
The Leave No Child Inside Initiative focuses on connecting children of all ages with the nature in their region. Projects sponsored by this initiative give children and teens the opportunities to explore nature, camping, and service learning projects. This initiative was created in sync with the movement, No Child Left Inside (movement). This movement has prompted other states to start their own programs similar to the one of Chicago Wilderness; Leave No Child Inside, Greater Cincinnati and No Child Left Inside, Connecticut are just a few.

=== Restoring the Health of Local Nature ===
The Restoring the Health of Local Nature initiatives main purpose is to help return the environment in the Chicago region to its once healthy condition. The Chicago Wilderness has implemented projects that allow people to enjoy clean air, water and help restore and preserve their environment. As part of this initiation, Chicago wilderness takes part in an annual service day called National Public Lands Day, in which volunteers work together to restore natural regions for future generations. Chicago Wilderness sponsors 15 different sites where volunteers can help on this day.

== Accomplishments ==
Since 1996, Chicago Wilderness has undertaken more than 500 environmental projects in the Chicago region. The foundation has received over 38 grants totaling over $15 million to support conservation projects. Chicago Wilderness has produced the region's first Biodiversity Recovery Program. (Biodiversity Action Plan) Periodically, Chicago Wilderness conducts climate change reports for the Chicago area which are successful in predictors for future changes. As part of the "Leave No Child Inside" initiative, The Teaching Academy was produced. The academy is a program which high school teachers and experts from the Chicago Botanic Garden and the Lake County Forest Preserve collaborate to emphasize the importance of biodiversity in their teaching. The Urban Forestry Task Force was created to stress the importance of the woodland biodiversity conservation in a metropolitan and suburban environment. Chicago Wilderness has been honored by The Institute for Conservation Leadership for the preservation of nature that is "creative, visionary and highly effective". In 2000, Chicago Wilderness and the United States Environmental Protection Agency developed The Conservation and Native Landscaping Awards to recognize the use of native plants in landscaping. They continue to recognize the hard work of corporations, parks and municipalities.
