= Cyclone (disambiguation) =

A cyclone is an area of closed, circular fluid motion characterized by inwardly spiraling winds.

Cyclone may also refer to:

== Places ==
- Cyclone, Indiana, an unincorporated community
- Cyclone, Kentucky, an unincorporated community
- Cyclone, Missouri, an unincorporated community
- Cyclone, Pennsylvania, an unincorporated community
- Cyclone, West Virginia, an unincorporated community
- Cyclone Lake, a lake in Utah

== Arts, entertainment, and media ==
=== Fictional entities ===
- Cyclone (DC Comics), a Justice Society of America heroine
- Cyclone (Marvel Comics), a fictional Spider-Man villain
- Cyclone, a type of transformable powered armor for infantry in the Robotech universe
- The Cyclone, a fictional motorcycle used by Kamen Rider 1

=== Films ===
- The Cyclone (1920 film), an American drama by Clifford Smith
- Cyclone (1978 film), starring Arthur Kennedy and Carroll Baker
- Cyclone (1987 film), a science fiction film featuring Heather Thomas, Jeffrey Combs and Martin Landau
- The Cyclone (1996 film), an Italian film

=== Games ===
- Cyclone (pinball), a 1988 pinball game by Williams
- Cyclone (video game), a 1985 computer game for the ZX Spectrum
- CyClones, a video game by Raven Software

=== Music ===
==== Albums ====
- Cyclone (Tangerine Dream album)
- Cyclone (Baby Bash album) (2007)

==== Songs ====
- "Cyclone" (song), 2007, by Baby Bash
- "Cyclone", a song by Dub Pistols
- "Cyclone", a song by 12012
- "Cyclone", a song by StillWell
- "Cyclone", a song by Pinegrove from 11:11 (2022)

==== Other music ====
- Fender Cyclone, an electric guitar
- The Cyclones, a New York City rock and roll band in the late 1970s and early 1980s

=== Other arts, entertainment, and media ===
- Cyclone!, a 1985 Australian superhero anthology comic book

== Computing and technology ==
- Cyclone (programming language), a C-derived programming language
- Cyclonic separation, used for separation of solids from a gas
- Cyclone (computer), an early vacuum tube computer
- Cyclone, a family of field-programmable gate arrays from Altera, now part of Intel's Programmable Solutions Group
- ACA Cyclone, a civil defense siren

== Military and related areas ==
- 38th Infantry Division (United States), nicknamed Cyclone
- Caudron C.714 Cyclone, an unsuccessful French fighter aircraft which saw some use early in World War II
- French ship Cyclone, one of several French navy ships named Cyclone
- Operation Cyclone, a CIA program to arm and finance Afghan mujahideen (1979–1989)
- Operation Cyclone, the Allied World War II assault on the Pacific island of Noemfoor, part of the Battle of Noemfoor
- Sikorsky CH-148 Cyclone, Canadian Forces Air Command designation for the Sikorsky H-92 Superhawk helicopter
- USS Cyclone (PC-1), a US Navy coastal patrol ship
  - Cyclone-class patrol ship
- Cyclone (rifle), one of three models manufactured by British company Steel Core Designs

== Roller coasters ==
- Cyclone (Dreamworld), a roller coaster at Dreamworld, Queensland, Australia
- Cyclone (Lakeside Amusement Park), a wooden roller coaster at Lakeside Amusement Park in Denver, Colorado
- Cyclone (Palisades Amusement Park), a pair of roller coasters that formerly operated at Palisades Amusement Park in Bergen County, New Jersey
- Cyclone (Revere Beach), a roller coaster formerly at Revere Beach in Revere, Massachusetts
- Cyclone, a roller coaster formerly at Geauga Lake, Aurora, Ohio
- Cyclone, a roller coaster formerly at Cedar Point, Sandusky, Ohio
- Carolina Cyclone, a roller coaster at Carowinds near Charlotte, North Carolina
- Coney Island Cyclone, a roller coaster in Coney Island, New York
- Crystal Beach Cyclone, a roller coaster at Crystal Beach, Ontario, Canada
- Cyclone Coaster, a roller coaster at Sandspit Entertainment Cavendish Beach in Cavendish, Prince Edward Island, Canada
- Cyclone Racer, a twin track roller coaster at The Pike, Long Beach, California
- Giant Cyclone Safety Coasters, a model line of steel-framed wood roller coasters designed by Harry Traver
- Sesquicentennial Cyclone, a roller coaster formerly operated at the 1926 Philadelphia Sesquicentennial Exposition as well as other locations
- Texas Cyclone, a former roller coaster at the defunct Six Flags Astroworld, Houston, Texas
- Twisted Cyclone, a roller coaster at Six Flags Over Georgia, Atlanta, Georgia
- Wicked Cyclone, a roller coaster at Six Flags New England in Agawam, Massachusetts

== Sports teams ==
=== Australia ===
- Cairns Cyclones, an Australian former rugby league club (1996–2000)
- Queensland Cyclones, a broomball team

=== Canada ===
- Cypress Cyclones, a Junior ice hockey franchise from Maple Creek, Saskatchewan
- Listowel Cyclones, a Junior ice hockey team based in Listowel, Ontario
- Tamworth Cyclones, a former Junior ice hockey team based in Tamworth, Ontario

=== United States ===
- Brooklyn Cyclones, a minor league baseball team
- Cincinnati Cyclones, a minor league hockey team
- Connecticut Cyclones, a team of the Women's Football Alliance
- H-Town Texas Cyclones, a former Independent Women's Football League team based in Houston, Texas
- Iowa State Cyclones, the Iowa State University sports teams
- Jacksonville Cyclones, a defunct American soccer team
- Twin City Cyclones, a former minor league ice hockey team based in Winston-Salem, North Carolina

=== Elsewhere ===
- Cyclones of Chittagong, a Bangladeshi cricket team
- Zhejiang Cyclones or Zhejiang Golden Bulls, a Chinese Basketball Association team

== Transportation ==
=== Air ===
- St-Just Cyclone, a Canadian kit aircraft
- Wright Cyclone series, a family of piston engines for aircraft in the 1930s and 1940s

=== Land ===
- Cyclone (motorcycle), manufactured from 1912 through 1917
- Buell M2 Cyclone, a model of Buell Motorcycle Company motorcycle produced from 1997 to 2003
- Cadillac Cyclone, a 1959 concept car designed by Harley Earl
- Ford Cyclone engine, the codename of the Duratec 35
- Mercury Cyclone, a former mid-size muscle car
- Raleigh Cyclone, a model of mountain bike

=== Sea ===
- Capri Cyclone, an American sailing dinghy design

== Other uses ==
- Cyclonic separation, a technology to separate particulates from fluids by centrifugal force
- Cyclone fence, a type of wire-mesh fence
- Cyclone Tools, Australian manufacturing company
- Cyclone (nickname)
- Tetraphenylcyclopentadienone, an organic chemical

== See also ==
- GMC Syclone, a high-performance version of the GMC Sonoma pickup truck
- Psyclone (roller coaster), a former roller coaster at Six Flags Magic Mountain, Valencia, Santa Clarita, California
- Tsyklon, a Ukrainian expendable space rocket
- Zyklon (disambiguation)
- Tornado
