= List of broomball teams =

Broomball is a winter sport played internationally. Some of the most notable teams are listed here, along with their achievements in the sport.

== Canada ==
- National Association: Broomball Canada (formerly the Canadian Broomball Federation).
- National Team: The Legion

== United States ==
- National Associations: All Elite Broomball (AEB) and the United States Broomball Association (USBA). (formerly USA Broomball)

Team name	State/Province/Area	Notable achievements	Source
Smart Mortgage Blues (formerly USA Blue)	Minnesota	Five-time USA Broomball men's national champions; Two-time USA Broomball masters national champions; Four-time North American Championships champions	
Minnesota Red (formerly USA Red)	Minnesota	IFBA Men's World Champions 2002	
QA	Minnesota	One-time North American Championships champions	
Miami University	Ohio	One-time (inaugural) USA Broomball women's champions	
Minnesota Hitmen	Minnesota	Two-time Midwestern champions	
Inferno	Minnesota	Two-time USA Broomball Men's Champions; Four-time North American Championships Champions	

== Italy ==
National Association: Comitato Italiano Broomball

== Austria ==
National Association:

Team name	State/Province/Area	Notable achievements	Source
Broomball Austria	(Tyrol (federal state)) Tyrol	First Austrian Broomball Team, 4th place European Broomball Championships 2009	

== Australia ==
National Association: Broomball Australia

Team name	State/Province/Area	Notable achievements	Source
Australian Capital Territory	(Australian Capital Territory) ACT	13-time men's national champions 4-time women's national champions 9-time mixed national champions	
New South Wales Sliders	New South Wales	2-time men's national champions 4-time women's national champions 5-time mixed national champions	
Queensland Cyclones	Queensland	1-time mixed national champions	
South Australia Sharks	South Australia	2-time men's national champions 1-time mixed national champions	

== Switzerland ==
National Association: Association Suisse de Broomball

== Japan ==
National Association: Japanese Broomball Association
