= DHC Corporation =

Japanese supplements/cosmetics company

- Native name: 株式会社ディーエイチシー
- Romanized name: Kabushiki-gaisha Dī Eichi Shī
- Type: KK
- Industry: Cosmetics; Health food; Dietary supplements
- Founded: 1972
- Founder: Yoshiaka Yoshida
- Headquarters: Minami-Azabu, Tokyo, Japan
- Area served: Worldwide
- Key people: Shigeo Takatani (Chairman, CEO); Midori Miyazaki (President, COO)
- Parent: Orix
- Website: www.dhc.co.jp

DHC Corporation (株式会社ディーエイチシー, Kabushiki-gaisha Dī Eichi Shī), initials of Daigaku Honyaku Center (大学翻訳センター, Daigaku Honyaku Sentā; lit. "University Translation Center") is a Japanese manufacturer dealing in cosmetics and health food supplements headquartered in Tokyo, Japan. It was established in 1972.

Originally started in Japan as a translation business, DHC Corporation ventured into other enterprises and is now a manufacturer of cosmetics, vitamins, healthy foods, and lingerie. In addition to these ventures, DHC Corporation has an educational and publishing department, hotel and spa, and two aesthetic salons. It is also a minor shareholder in the music chart operator Oricon Inc. and was a parent company to the Fukuoka-based radio station Cross FM. It started a helicopter business in 2008. DHC's flagship brand name is "Olive Virgin Oil".

== Sponsored sporting events ==
- LBO Ladies Bowling Tour
- Sagan Tosu football club (on shirts)
- IFBA (International Federation of Broomball Associations) World Broomball Championships, Tomokomai, Japan (November 2014) Platinum tournament sponsor and sponsor of the Japanese broomball Team (Team Red, Team White in the Men's division), Japanese ladies broomball team, Japanese mixed broomball team and the Japanese masters' broomball team.

== Controversy ==
=== Anti-Korean statements by founder and withdrawal from Korea ===
In 2020 and 2021, founder and then-CEO Yoshiaki Yoshida made statements considered offensive to Korean people. They included promoting DHC's employment of "pure Japanese" staff and models without Korean heritage, use of the pejorative term "チョン" on DHC's official Instagram, and negatively describing their appearance. This has generated backlash and was followed by the company's exit from South Korea at the end of 2021. After DHC was acquired by Orix in 2023, he briefly remained as chairman, but stepped down by the end of the year after another controversy. He retains no ties to DHC.

== Models appearing in DHC TV commercials ==
- Akihiro Miwa
- Chisato Moritaka
- Erika Yamakawa
- Im Jin-ah
- Kano sisters
- Maho Honda
- Naomi Hosokawa
- Nanako Fujisaki
- Suzuko Irie
- Yoshihiro Akiyama
- Yoon Eun Hye
