= Cyclone (comics) =

Cyclone, in comics, may refer to:

- Cyclone (Marvel Comics), a number of Marvel Comics characters
- Cyclone (DC Comics), a DC Comics character
- Cyclone!, an Australian superhero anthology comic book
- Cyclone, a character from Quality Comics

== See also ==
- Cyclone (disambiguation)
