= Psyclone =

Psyclone may refer to:

- Psyclone (Canada's Wonderland)
- Psyclone (roller coaster), at Six Flags Magic Mountain
- Psyclone (album), a 1995 album by Jimmy Barnes
- "Psyclones", a song by Psycho Realm from their 1997 album, The Psycho Realm
- "Psyclone!", a song by Super Furry Animals from their 2005 album, Love Kraft
- Psyclones, an experimental music industrial band

== See also ==
- Cyclone (disambiguation)
