= IFBA World Broomball Championships =

Broomball Championship3

- Sport: Broomball
- Founded: 1991; 35 years ago
- No. of teams: Differing
- Countries: World
- Most recent champions: Men's: (Canada) Helicopters; Women's: (United States) Team USA; Mixed: (Canada) Broom-shak
- Most titles: (Canada) Canadian teams

The IFBA World Broomball Championships (WBC), formerly the "World Broomball Championships", is the premiere international competition for the sport of broomball and is organized and administered by the International Federation of Broomball Associations (IFBA). The competition is organized every even-numbered year and is held every two years in international locations using the skills and expertise of various host cities and member associations. Teams named after their respective nation such as "Team Canada" are monikers earned by the team which has won the most recent national tournament in their country of origin.

Unlike the provincial and national championships in Ontario and Canada, teams from a variety of countries apply rather than qualify to compete in the World Broomball Championships and there is no need to compete for entry. Most events now have a minimum of 48 teams and well over 1100 athletes attend. The vast majority of broomball players and teams are based in Canada or the USA and as a result most of the championships to date have been held in this part of the world.

Traditionally World Championships see teams enter from Canada, United States, Italy, Japan, Switzerland, France and Australia. Teams representing Austria, Slovenia and Germany, have also taken part but due to limited player numbers and broomball programs these nations are not able to attend each World Championship. Australia, Japan and Canada have sent teams to every World Championship.

== History ==
The World Broomball Championships (WBC) were initially known as the, "Challenge Cup". The largest number of teams ever registered for the world championships was seen in Ottawa, Canada at the 2012 World Broomball Championships.

- The first World Broomball Championships were held in Victoria, British Columbia in 1991. The event was attended by over 800 athletes and 44 teams.
- The 1998 World Broomball Championships were held in Bolzano, Italy.
- The 2010 World Broomball Championships were held in Austria with venues in Innsbruck and Telfs, and were organized and run directly by the Board of the International Federation of Broomball Associations (IFBA).
- The 2014 World Broomball Championships were the eleventh edition of the championships and were held in Tomakomai, Japan.
- The 2016 World Broomball Championships were held in Regina, Saskatchewan, Canada, and were hosted by the Saskatchewan Broomball Association, a member association of Broomball Canada.
- The 2018 World Broomball Championships were held in Blaine, Minnesota, United States. It was the thirteenth edition of the championships.
- The 2022 World Broomball Championships was held in Kingston, Ontario, Canada.
- The 2024 World Broomball Championships was held in Mont-Blanc, France.
- The 2026 World Broomball Championships was held in Whitehorse, Yukon, Canada.

== Competition format ==
The World Championships are primarily held between member association national teams but club teams are also accepted. There are different divisions:

- Men's - 2 divisions (full contact)
- Women's (non contact)
- Mixed (co-ed - non contact)
- Masters (non contact)

== Champions ==
Key:

- WC = World Cup Division (top division)
- CC = Challenge Cup Division (second division)
- NAC = North American Cup (third division).

Year	Host city	Men's Champion	Women's Champion	Mixed (Coed) Champion
1991	(Canada) Victoria	(Canada) Embrun Plumbing	(Canada) Amigo Bécancour (Qc)	(Canada) Selkirk Flying Angels
1996	(Canada) Victoria	(Canada) Ottawa	Not Contested	(Canada) Edmonton Selects
1998	(Italy) Bolzano	(Canada) Montreal	Not Contested	(United States) Minnesota Flames
2000	(Canada) Victoria	(Canada) Ottawa Nationals	Not Contested	(Canada) Edmonton Extreme
2002	(United States) Minneapolis	(United States) USA Red	Not Contested	(Canada) Cabano
2004	(Canada) Corner Brook	(Canada) Ottawa Nationals	(Canada) Durham Angels	(Canada) Briquetal
2006	(United States) Blaine	(Canada) Le Frost (WC) (United States) St Paul Barons (CC) (United States) Colorado Crusaders (NAC)	(United States) Minnesota Selects (WC) Australia Dingoes (CC)	(Canada) East Ontario Wildcats (WC) (Canada) Manitoba Rebels (CC)
2008	(Canada) Vancouver	(Canada) Le Frost (WC)	(Canada) McMillan Sand and Gravel (WC)	(Canada) Eastern Ontario Wildcats (WC)
2010	(Austria) Innsbruck	(Canada) Le Frost (WC) (Canada) Ottawa Icemen (CC)	Italy Girls (WC) (Canada) Lapierre Sport / Olymel Cornwall (CC)	Canada - New Brunswick (WC) (Italy) Broomball Club Belluno Mixed (CC)
2012	(Canada) Ottawa	(Canada) Ottawa Nationals	(Canada) Ottawa Stars	(Canada) Broom-Shak Bécancour (QC)
2014	(Japan) Tomakomai	(Canada) Ravens Yellowknife (NWT)	(Canada) Rebels Yellowknife (NWT)	(Canada) GT Quebec (QC)
2016	(Canada) Regina	(Canada) Ottawa Nationals	(Canada) Huskies (QC)	(Canada) Broom-Shak Bécancour (QC)
2018	(United States) Blaine	(Canada) Ottawa Nationals (ON)	(Canada) Amigo Bécancour (QC)	(Canada) Broom-Shak Bécancour (QC)
2022	(Canada) Kingston	(Canada) Minto Selects	Team Canada (Eastern Rebels)	Team Canada (Broom-Shak Bécancour)
2024	(France) Mont Blanc	(Canada) Helicopters	(United States) Canards gris d'Amérique	(United States) Squall
2026	(Canada) Whitehorse	(Canada) Helicopters	(United States) Team USA	(Canada) Broom-shak

== See also ==
- Broomball
- Broomball Canada
- Broomball Australia
- USA Broomball
