= Fence insert =

Patent for a fence insert (1893)

A fence insert is an object designed to fit or clip into standard chain-link fencing. Current products on the market include privacy slats that weave through the fence, plastic-shaped cups designed to clip into open cells, and two-part interlocking units which attach together at the crossover of fence wires.

== History ==
The origin of fence inserts can be traced back to U.S. patent #507,952, filed by Clarence White of Minneapolis, Minnesota on October 31st of 1893 The invention consists of "marbles or other loose independent filling pieces" sized to allow placement within the cells of a wire mesh. The purpose of the invention is described as providing "a convenient and economical means of lettering, ornamenting, or filling" the wire mesh.

== Objectives ==
There are three main objectives typically fulfilled by fence inserts. One is to provide privacy by converting chain link fencing into an opaque surface. Another is to exploit the fence as a site for signage, often providing low-resolution displays of corporate logos, sports mascots or verbal messages. A third objective of fence inserts is to decorate otherwise plain fencing.

== See also ==
- Drift fence
