= Hurricane (nickname) =

Hurricane is a nickname for:

- Al Hurricane (Alberto Nelson Sanchez, 1936–2017), American singer-songwriter
- DJ Hurricane (Wendell Timothy Fite, born 1965), American rapper and DJ
- Hurricane Chris (rapper) (Christopher Jerrod Dooley Jr., born 1989), American rapper
- Hurricane G (Gloria Rodríguez, 1970–2022), American rapper
- Hurricane Ryu (Hidemi Miyata, born 1958), Japanese actor and manga artist
- Shane Burgos (born 1991), UFC fighter
- Rubin Carter (1937–2014), American boxer wrongly convicted of murder
- Para Draine (born 1972), American female boxer
- Bob Hannah (born 1956), American motorcycle racer
- Bob Hazle (1930–1992), American Major League Baseball player
- Gregory Helms, of The Hurricane and Rosey, a WWE professional wrestling tag team
- Alex Higgins (1949–2010), snooker player from Northern Ireland
- Duncan Hutchison (1904-1973), Scottish footballer nicknamed "Hurricane Hutch"
- Robert Skene (polo player) (1914-1997), nicknamed "Hurricane Bob"
- Norman Smith (record producer) (1923–2008), English recording engineer and producer nicknamed "Hurricane Smith"

== See also ==
- Cyclone (nickname)
