= Australian National Broomball Championships =

- Current season, competition or edition: 2022 Australian National Broomball Championships
- Sport: Broomball
- Founded: 1990; 36 years ago: Men's Elite (1990); Women's Elite (1999); Mixed Elite (1990); Men's Intermediate (2003); Women's Intermediate (2012); Mixed Intermediate (2003)
- Country: Australia

The Australian National Broomball Championships is an annual broomball tournament, held in various cities across Australia, to determine Australia's national champions. The tournament is organized by the national governing body for the sport, Broomball Australia.

The Championships have been held annually since 1990, and attracts representative teams from New South Wales, Queensland, Australian Capital Territory, South Australia, and Victoria. Teams representing Gold Coast and Coffs Harbour have also participated in the past. In 2003 an invitational team composed of American and Japanese players took part but were ineligible for finals.

The 2022 Broomball Championships was held from April 21 - April 24 at Penrith Ice Palace, including both Men's and Women's competitions.

== Divisions ==
Six divisions are contested annually (starting year in brackets): Men's Elite (1990), Women's Elite (1999), Mixed Elite (1990), Men's Intermediate (2003), Women's Intermediate (2012), and Mixed Intermediate (2003).

== Men's Elite division ==
The Australian Capital Territory (ACT) has been by far the most successful team in the Men's Elite division.

List of Men's Elite Champions and Runners Up by Year
| Year | Host city | Champion | Runner up |
|---|---|---|---|
| 1990 | Bendigo, Victoria | South Australia | ACT |
| 1991 | Bendigo, Victoria | South Australia | ACT |
| 1992 | Adelaide, South Australia | ACT | South Australia |
| 1993 | Canberra, ACT | ACT (ACT Flames) | ACT (ACT Animals) |
| 1994 | Bendigo, Victoria | ACT | South Australia |
| 1995 | Bendigo, Victoria | ACT | South Australia |
| 1996 | Sydney, New South Wales | ACT | Queensland |
| 1997 | Gold Coast, Queensland | ACT | Queensland |
| 1998 | Adelaide, South Australia | ACT | Queensland |
| 1999 | Townsville, Queensland | ACT | New South Wales |
| 2000 | Canberra, ACT | ACT | Queensland |
| 2001 | Sydney, New South Wales | ACT | New South Wales |
| 2002 | Adelaide, South Australia | ACT | South Australia |
| 2003 | Canberra, ACT | ACT | New South Wales |
| 2004 | Gold Coast, Queensland | New South Wales | North Queensland |
| 2005 | Sydney, New South Wales | ACT | Queensland |
| 2006 | Adelaide, South Australia | New South Wales | ACT |
| 2007 | Canberra, ACT | ACT | New South Wales |
| 2008 | Sydney, New South Wales | New South Wales | ACT |
| 2009 | Adelaide, South Australia | New South Wales | South Australia |
| 2010 | Canberra, ACT | New South Wales | South Australia |
| 2011 | | New South Wales | ACT |
| 2012 | Melbourne, Victoria | New South Wales | ACT |
| 2013 | Adelaide, South Australia | New South Wales | Queensland |
| 2014 | Canberra, ACT | New South Wales | ACT |
| 2015 | Erina, New South Wales | New South Wales | ACT |
| 2016 | Erina, New South Wales | ACT | New South Wales |
| 2017 | Adelaide, South Australia | New South Wales | South Australia |
| 2018 | Canberra, ACT | ACT | New South Wales |
| 2019 | Melbourne, Victoria | New South Wales | ACT |
| 2022 | Penrith, New South Wales | New South Wales (NSW Blue) | New South Wales (NSW Orange) |
| 2023 | Adelaide, South Australia | New South Wales | South Australia |
| 2024 | Melbourne, Victoria | New South Wales | ACT |
| 2025 | Canberra, ACT | New South Wales | ACT |
| 2026 | Erina, New South Wales | South Australia | New South Wales |

Number of Men's Elite Titles per Representative Team
| State/Territory | Championships | Runners up Titles |
|---|---|---|
| Australian Capital Territory | 16 | 12 (including 1 all-ACT final) |
| New South Wales | 16 | 8 (including 1 all-NSW final) |
| North Queensland | 0 | 1 |
| Queensland | 0 | 6 |
| South Australia | 3 | 8 |

Men's Elite Player Statistics Leaders
| Honour | Name | State/Territory | # |
|---|---|---|---|
| Most Games Played | Shane Martin | Australian Capital Territory | 192 |
| Most Goals Scored | Shane Martin | Australian Capital Territory | 109 |
| Most Assists | Shane Martin | Australian Capital Territory | 50 |
| Most Points | Shane Martin | Australian Capital Territory | 159 |
| Most Hat-Tricks | Shane Martin | Australian Capital Territory | 8 |
| Most Shut Outs | Bruce Davidson | Australian Capital Territory | 28 |

== Women's Elite division ==
List of Women's Elite Champions and Runners Up by Year
| Year | Host city | Champion | Runner up |
|---|---|---|---|
| 1999 | Townsville, Queensland | ACT | New South Wales & Queensland (combined team) |
| 2000 | Canberra, ACT | ACT | New South Wales |
| 2001 | Sydney, New South Wales | ACT | New South Wales |
| 2002 | Adelaide, South Australia | ACT | South Australia |
| 2003 | Canberra, ACT | New South Wales | ACT |
| 2004 | Gold Coast, Queensland | New South Wales | South Australia |
| 2005 | Sydney, New South Wales | New South Wales | Queensland |
| 2006 | Adelaide, South Australia | New South Wales | Queensland |
| 2007 | Canberra, ACT | New South Wales | Queensland |
| 2008 | Sydney, New South Wales | South Australia | New South Wales |
| 2009 | Adelaide, South Australia | New South Wales | South Australia |
| 2010 | Canberra, ACT | New South Wales | South Australia |
| 2011 | | | |
| 2012 | Melbourne, Victoria | South Australia | New South Wales |
| 2013 | Adelaide, South Australia | South Australia | ACT |
| 2014 | Canberra, ACT | ACT | South Australia |
| 2015 | Erina, New South Wales | ACT | New South Wales (NSW #1) |
| 2016 | Erina, New South Wales | New South Wales (NSW #1) | ACT |
| 2017 | Adelaide, South Australia | South Australia (SA #1) | New South Wales (NSW #1) |
| 2018 | Canberra, ACT | South Australia | ACT |
| 2019 | Melbourne, Victoria | New South Wales | ACT |
| 2022 | Penrith, New South Wales | New South Wales | South Australia |
| 2023 | Adelaide, South Australia | South Australia | ACT |
| 2024 | Melbourne, Victoria | ACT | South Australia |
| 2025 | Canberra, ACT | ACT | South Australia |
| 2026 | Erina, New South Wales | ACT | South Australia |

Number of Women's Elite Titles per Representative Team
| State/Territory | Championships | Runners up Titles |
|---|---|---|
| Australian Capital Territory | 9 | 6 |
| New South Wales | 10 | 7 (includes 1 combined with Queensland) |
| Queensland | 0 | 4 (includes 1 combined with New South Wales) |
| South Australia | 6 | 8 |

Women's Elite Player Statistics Leaders (accurate up to and including 2006 National Championships)
| Honour | Name | State/Territory | # |
|---|---|---|---|
| Most Games Played | Tracy Allison | Australian Capital Territory | 22 |
| Most Goals Scored | Tracy Ivin | New South Wales | 16 |
| Most Assists | Tracy Ivin | New South Wales | 9 |
| Most Points | Tracy Ivin | New South Wales | 25 (16 goals, 9 assists) |
| Most Hat-Tricks | Nikki Brown; Chris Jeacle-Banks | Australian Capital Territory | 1 |
| Most Shut Outs | Donna Law; Shannon Vost | Australian Capital Territory; New South Wales | 4 |

== Mixed Elite division ==
In mixed play, each team has an equal number of male and female players on the ice. The ACT have also had a successful history in this division.

List of Mixed Elite Champions and Runners Up by Year
| Year | Host city | Champion | Runner up |
|---|---|---|---|
| 1990 | Bendigo, Victoria | South Australia | ACT |
| 1991 | Bendigo, VictoriaACT | South Australia | |
| 1992 | Adelaide, South Australia | ACT | South Australia |
| 1993 | Canberra, ACT | ACT (ACT Cougars) | ACT (ACT #2) |
| 1994 | Bendigo, VictoriaACT (ACT Cougars) | ACT (ACT #2) | |
| 1995 | Bendigo, Victoria | Queensland | ACT |
| 1996 | Sydney, New South Wales | ACT | Queensland |
| 1997 | Gold Coast, Queensland | ACT | Queensland |
| 1998 | Adelaide, South Australia | ACT | New South Wales |
| 1999 | Townsville, Queensland | New South Wales | ACT |
| 2000 | Canberra, ACT | ACT | New South Wales |
| 2001 | Sydney, New South Wales | New South Wales | ACT |
| 2002 | Adelaide, South Australia | New South Wales | ACT |
| 2003 | Canberra, ACT | ACT | Queensland |
| 2004 | Gold Coast, Queensland | Gold Coast | South Australia |
| 2005 | Sydney, New South Wales | New South Wales | Queensland |
| 2006 | Adelaide, South Australia | New South Wales | ACT |
| 2007 | Canberra, ACT | New South Wales | Queensland |
| 2008 | | | |
| 2009 | | | |
| 2010 | | | |
| 2011 | | | |
| 2012 | Melbourne, Victoria | New South Wales | Queensland |
| 2013 | Adelaide, South Australia | Queensland | New South Wales |
| 2014 | Canberra, ACT | ACT | New South Wales |
| 2015 | Erina, New South Wales | New South Wales (NSW #1) | ACT |
| 2016 | Erina, New South Wales | | |
| 2017 | Adelaide, South Australia | New South Wales (NSW #1) | New South Wales (NSW #2) |
| 2018 | Canberra, ACT | New South Wales (NSW #2) | South Australia |
| 2019 | Canberra, ACT | New South Wales (NSW #1) | ACT |
| 2020 | | | |
| 2021 | | | |
| 2022 | | | |

Number of Mixed Elite Titles per Representative Team
| State/Territory | Championships | Runners up Titles |
|---|---|---|
| Australian Capital Territory | 10 | 9 (including 2 all-ACT finals) |
| Gold Coast | 1 | 0 |
| New South Wales | 11 | 5 (including 1 all-NSW final) |
| Queensland | 2 | 6 |
| South Australia | 1 | 4 |

Mixed Elite Player Statistics Leaders (accurate up to and including 2006 National Championships)
| Honour | Name | State/Territory | # |
|---|---|---|---|
| Most Games Played | Tracy Allison | Australian Capital Territory | 72 |
| Most Goals Scored | Saxon Hooper | New South Wales & Queensland | 67 |
| Most Assists | Saxon Hooper | New South Wales & Queensland | 26 |
| Most Points | Saxon Hooper | New South Wales & Queensland | 93 (67 goals, 26 assists) |
| Most Hat-Tricks | Saxon Hooper Chris Lucas (tied) | New South Wales & Queensland (Hooper); Australian Capital Territory (Lucas) | 6 |
| Most Shut Outs | Ian Easterbrook | Australian Capital Territory | 8 |

== Men's Intermediate division ==
New South Wales have won two of the four Men's Intermediate titles since the division was introduced at the 2003 National Championships.

List of Men's Intermediate Champions and Runners Up by Year
| Year | Host city | Champion | Runner up |
|---|---|---|---|
| 2003 | Canberra, ACT | ACT | New South Wales |
| 2004 | Gold Coast, Queensland | Gold Coast | New South Wales |
| 2005 | Sydney, New South Wales | New South Wales | ACT |
| 2006 | Adelaide, South Australia | New South Wales (NSW #1) | New South Wales (NSW #2) |
| 2007 | Canberra, ACT | New South Wales | ACT |
| 2008 | | | |
| 2009 | | | |
| 2010 | | | |
| 2011 | | | |
| 2012 | Melbourne, Victoria | New South Wales | Queensland |
| 2013 | Adelaide, South Australia | South Australia | New South Wales (NSW #1) |
| 2014 | Canberra, ACT | New South Wales | ACT |
| 2015 | Erina, New South Wales | New South Wales | ACT |
| 2016 | Erina, New South Wales | South Australia | New South Wales (NSW #3) |
| 2017 | Adelaide, South Australia | South Australia (SA #1) | New South Wales (NSW #1) |
| 2018 | Canberra, ACT | New South Wales (NSW #1) | ACT |
| 2019 | Melbourne, Victoria | New South Wales | Melbourne City |
| 2022 | Penrith, New South Wales | New South Wales (NSW Blue) | New South Wales (NSW Orange) |
| 2023 | Adelaide, South Australia | South Australia (SA White) | New South Wales |
| 2024 | Melbourne, Victoria | New South Wales | South Australia |
| 2025 | Canberra, ACT | New South Wales | ACT |
| 2026 | Erina, New South Wales | South Australia | New South Wales |

Number of Men's Intermediate Titles per Representative Team
| State/Territory | Championships | Runners up Titles |
|---|---|---|
| Australian Capital Territory | 1 | 6 |
| Gold Coast | 1 | 0 |
| Melbourne City | 0 | 1 |
| New South Wales | 11 | 9 (including 2 all-NSW finals) |
| South Australia | 5 | 1 |
| Queensland | 0 | 1 |

== Women's Intermediate division ==
List of Women's Intermediate Champions and Runners Up by Year
| Year | Host city | Champion | Runner up |
|---|---|---|---|
| 2012 | Melbourne, Victoria | ACT | Victoria |
| 2018 | Canberra, ACT | ACT | New South Wales |
| 2019 | Melbourne, Victoria | New South Wales | South Australia |
| 2022 | Penrith, New South Wales | New South Wales | South Australia |
| 2024 | Melbourne, Victoria | South Australia | New South Wales |
| 2025 | Canberra, ACT | New South Wales | South Australia |
| 2026 | Erina, New South Wales | New South Wales | South Australia |

Number of Women's Intermediate Titles per Representative Team
| State/Territory | Championships | Runners up Titles |
|---|---|---|
| ACT | 2 | 0 |
| New South Wales | 4 | 2 |
| South Australia | 1 | 4 |
| Victoria | 0 | 1 |

== Mixed Intermediate division ==
New South Wales have dominated the Mixed Intermediate division, winning three of the four titles up to 2006; the other one saw Coffs Harbour, a city in New South Wales, emerge victorious.

List of Mixed Intermediate Champions and Runners Up by Year
| Year | Host city | Champion | Runner up |
|---|---|---|---|
| 2003 | Canberra, ACT | New South Wales (NSW #1) | New South Wales (NSW #2) |
| 2004 | Gold Coast, Queensland | Coffs Harbour | Gold Coast |
| 2005 | Sydney, New South Wales | New South Wales (NSW #1) | New South Wales (NSW #2) |
| 2006 | Adelaide, South Australia | New South Wales (NSW #1) | Queensland |
| 2007 | Canberra, ACT | New South Wales (NSW #1) | Queensland |
| 2008 | | | |
| 2009 | | | |
| 2010 | | | |
| 2011 | | | |
| 2012 | Melbourne, Victoria | New South Wales | Queensland |
| 2013 | Adelaide, South Australia | South Australia | New South Wales |
| 2014 | Canberra, ACT | New South Wales (NSW #1) | ACT |
| 2015 | Erina, New South Wales | Central Coast | New South Wales (NSW #1) |
| 2016 | Erina, New South Wales | New South Wales (NSW #1) | New South Wales (NSW #3) |
| 2017 | Adelaide, South Australia | New South Wales (NSW #2) | South Australia (SA #2) |
| 2018 | Canberra, ACT | New South Wales (NSW #2) | New South Wales (NSW #1) |
| 2019 | Canberra, ACT | New South Wales (NSW #1) | South Australia |
| 2020 | | | |
| 2021 | | | |
| 2022 | | | |

Number of Mixed Intermediate Titles per Representative Team
| State/Territory | Championships | Runners up Titles |
|---|---|---|
| ACT | 0 | 1 |
| Central Coast | 1 | 0 |
| Coffs Harbour | 1 | 0 |
| Gold Coast | 0 | 1 |
| New South Wales | 10 | 6 (including 4 all-NSW finals) |
| South Australia | 1 | 2 |
| Queensland | 0 | 3 |

== See also ==
- Broomball Australia - organizing body
- Queensland Cyclones - representative team for Queensland
