= Broomball Canada =

Governing body of the sport of broomball in Canada

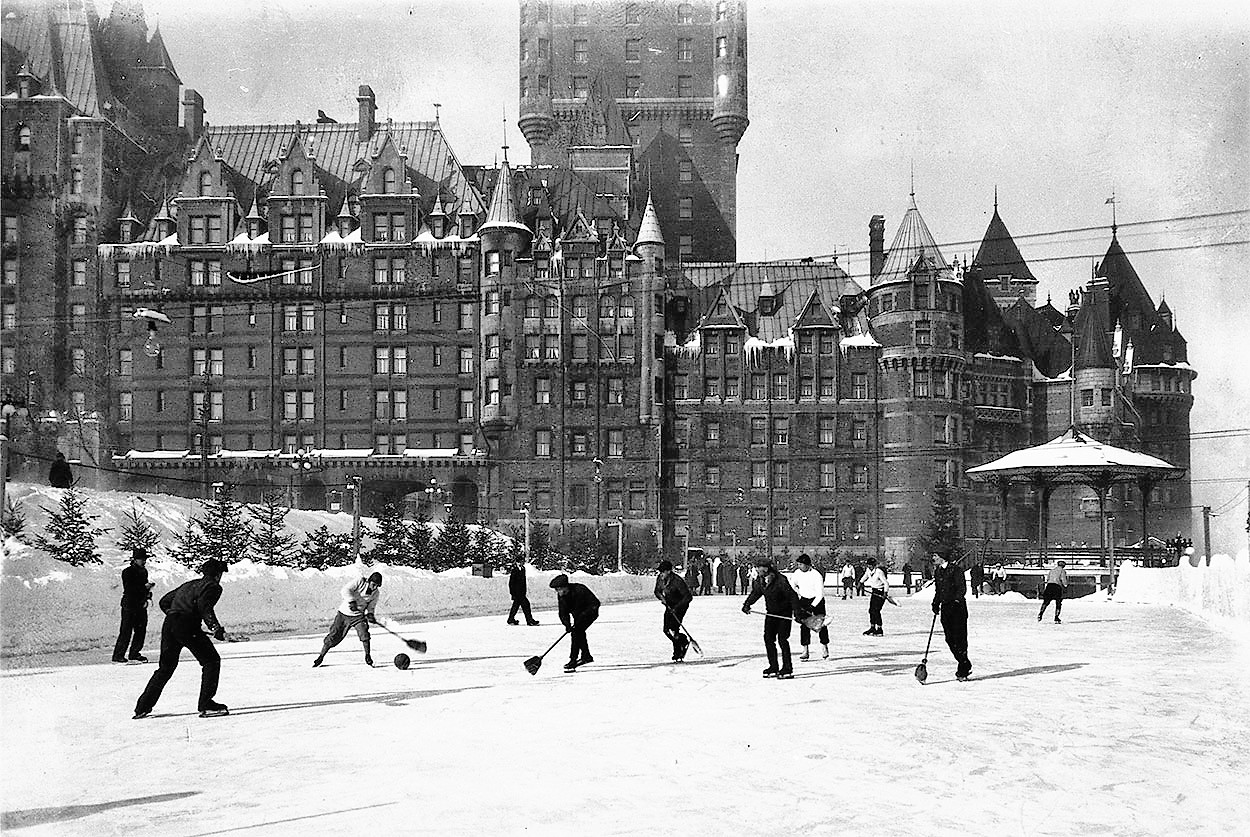
- Sport: Broomball
- Category: Winter sport Team sport Ball sport
- Abbreviation: BC
- Founded: 1976; 50 years ago
- Replaced: Canadian Broomball Federation

Official website
- www.broomball.ca
- (Canada)

Broomball Canada, formerly the Canadian Broomball Federation (CBF), is the official governing body of the sport of broomball in Canada.

The role of the organization is to provide leadership by promoting and developing broomball and developing and coordinating programs and services designed to meet the needs of the broomball community. The philosophy of the Broomball Canada places the athlete at the heart of the organization.

The annual Canadian membership is around 19,000 registered players with another 15,000 who participate at the recreational level which includes all age groups and schooling levels including elementary school.

The Canadian national broomball teams have competed in every World Broomball Championships since its inception.

== Competitive categories ==
Broomball Canada has four main competitive categories to classify the different sports levels and divisions that are available to all ages.

Age categories
Category	Age	Details
U12 (Pee Wee)	Boys or girls between 9 and 11	No contact
U14 (Bantam)	Boys or girls between 12 and 13	Played with contact
U16 (Midget)	Boys or girls between 14 and 15	Played with contact
U20 (Juvenile)	Boys or girls between 16 and 19	Played with contact
Elite (Juvenile and Senior)	Men or women 17 years and up	Played with contact
Intermediate	Men, women, and mixed teams 17 years and up	No contact

== History ==
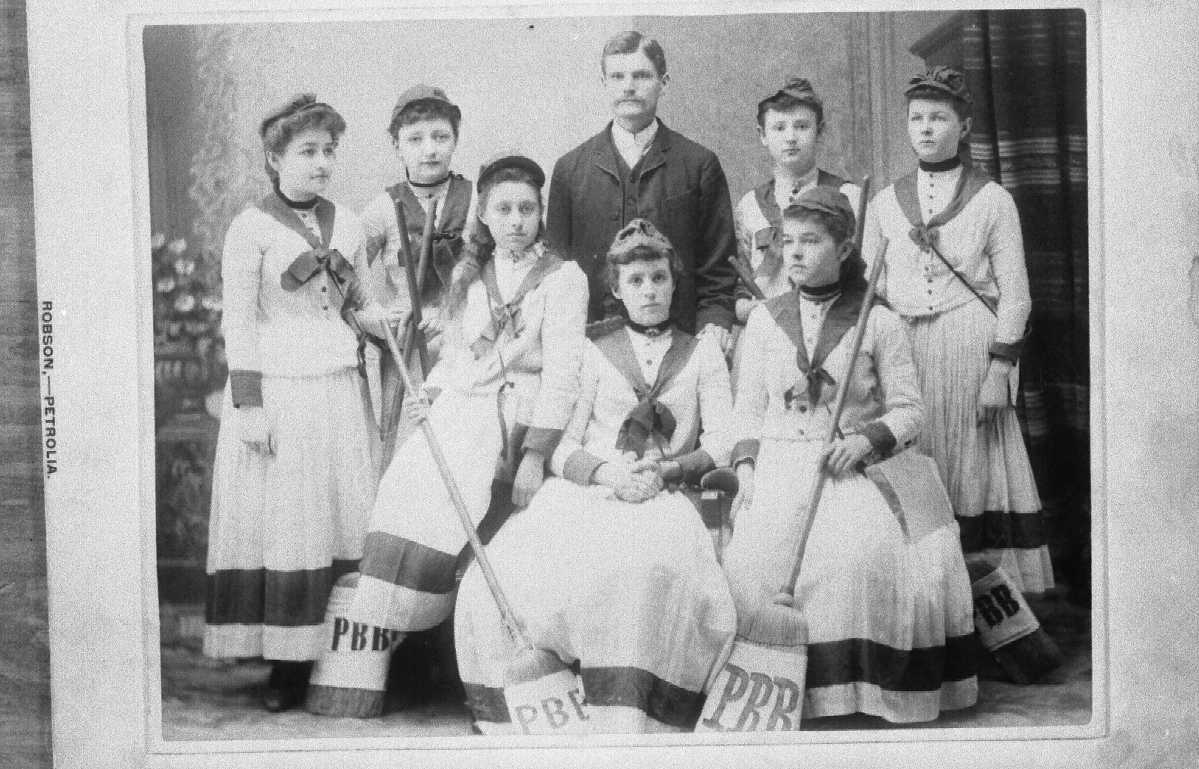
Antique Broomball - Petrolia Girls Team - Ontario, Canada - Early 1900s

The exact origin of the sport has been difficult to pinpoint. Broomball can be traced back to the early 1900s. The sport was played on icy surfaces about the size of today's hockey rinks, surfaces such as lakes, ponds and rivers. The First Nations peoples are believed to have passed the sport on to the settlers.

In 1961, the Fitness and Amateur Sport Act came into force in Canada whereby the Government of Canada made an official commitment to “encourage, promote and develop fitness and amateur sport in Canada.” A few years later, the Canadian government created two new directorates: Recreation Canada, which was tasked with improving the lifestyle of Canadians, and Sport Canada, which was responsible for developing competitive sport.

The predecessor to Broomball Canada, the Canadian Broomball Federation, was founded in 1976, roughly 10 years after the enactment of the Fitness and Amateur Sport Act. During the 1975 "national broomball tournament" in Montreal, Quebec it was decided that the sport needed a governing body. The members of the Alberta Broomball Association met with representatives of other Canadian provinces and formed what became the Canadian Broomball Federation.

In the 1980s, the organization developed the National Coaching Certification Program (NCCP) to focus on Canadian youth in the sport.

== Current status ==
Over the past half decade the sport has seen a great decline in participation, evidence of which can be seen in all age categories and levels of competition. Schools are showing less team development in both elementary and high schools in every Canadian province.

At the Canadian Broomball Championships (CBC) there are fewer provinces participating. Quebec, Ontario, Saskatchewan and Nova Scotia/New Brunswick (together as Maritimes) currently hold the sport together. The remaining provinces, Alberta, Manitoba, Newfoundland and Labrador, and British Columbia, were once big players in the sport but have taken a step back.

The lack of participation has been blamed on lack of leadership at the higher levels of the sport. Additionally, a lack of general awareness and knowledge of the sport in schools across Canada is considered to be another contributing factor. Adding to the problem is that broomball is sometimes confused with ringette and curling. Parents tend to sign their children up for mainstream sports such as ice hockey. Although broomball is more well known in rural areas, it lacks funding to become more popular and achieve growth in urban areas.

== Provincial Associations ==
Provincial Associations
Province or Territory	Association
Alberta	Alberta Broomball Association
British Columbia	British Columbia Broomball Society
Saskatchewan	Saskatchewan Broomball Association
Manitoba	Manitoba Broomball
Ontario	Federation of Broomball Associations of Ontario
Yukon	Yukon Broomball Association
Northwest Territories	Northwest Territories Broomball Association
Quebec	Federation Quebecoise de Ballon sur Glace
Newfoundland and Labrador	Broomball Newfoundland and Labrador
New Brunswick; Nova Scotia	The Maritimes Broomball Association (New Brunswick and Nova Scotia combined)

== Broomball Canada executives ==
2022
President	George Brown
Vice-President Marketing and Promotions	Chad Schneider
Vice-President Technical	Danny Decourval
Treasurer	Greg Mastervick
Secretary	Barbara Wlodarczyk
Referee in Chief	Doug Galt
Executive Assistant	Cathy Derewianchuk
High Performance Director	Racim Kebbab
Sport Development Coordinator	Véronique Cayer
Coaching Coordinator	

== National Championship results ==
=== Senior Men's ===
Senior Men's
Year	Host	Winner
2022	Saskatoon, SK	As de St-Coeur de Marie (Quebec)
2021	NO EVENT HELD(COVID-19)	
2020	NO EVENT HELD(COVID-19)	
2019	Cornwall, ON	Ottawa Nationals (Ontario)
2018	Portage La Prairie, MB	Ottawa Nationals (Ontario)
2017	Alma, QC	Patriotes (Quebec)
2016	Owen Sound, ON	Ottawa Nationals (Ontario)
2015	Montreal, QC	Palmerston Rookies (Ontario)
2014	Calgary, AB	Pogos (Quebec)
2013	Regina, SK	Briquetal L’Assomption (Quebec)
2012	Stratford, ON	Briquetal (Quebec)
2011	Blainville, QC	Ottawa Nationals (Ontario)
2010	Arnprior, ON	Pogos Rancuniers (Quebec)
2009	Saskatoon, SK	Ottawa Nationals (Ontario)
2008	Blainville, QC	Frost (Quebec)
2007	Selkirk, MB	Bruno Axemen (Saskatchewan)
2006	Leduc, AB	Bruno Axemen (Saskatchewan)
2005	Prince George, BC	Frost (Quebec)
2004	Longueuil, QC	Bruno Axemen (Saskatchewan)
2003	Cornerbrook, NL	Rang A Tangs (Ontario)
2002	Ottawa, ON	Titans (Quebec)
2001	Calgary, AB	Regina Silversceen Bruins (Saskatchewan)
2000	Halifax, NS	Embrun Pluming (Ontario)

=== Senior Women's ===
Senior Women's
Year	Host	Winner
2022	Saskatoon, SK	Eastern Rebels (Ontario)
2021	NO EVENT HELD(COVID-19)	
2020	NO EVENT HELD(COVID-19)	
2019	Cornwall, ON	Vipers (Ontario)
2018	Portage La Prairie, MB	Eastern Rebels (Ontario)
2017	Alma, QC	Eastern Rebels (Ontario)
2016	Owen Sound, ON	Huskies (Quebec)
2015	Montreal, QC	Huskies (Quebec)
2014	Calgary, AB	Huskies (Quebec)
2013	Regina, SK	Huskies (Quebec)
2012	Stratford, ON	Huskies (Quebec)
2011	Blainville, QC	Huskies (Quebec)
2010	Arnprior, ON	OSS (Ontario)
2009	Saskatoon, SK	Huskies (Quebec)
2008	Blainville, QC	McMillan Sand & Gravel (Ontario)
2007	Selkirk, MB	Huskies (Quebec)
2006	Leduc, AB	Huskies (Quebec)
2005	Prince George, BC	Huskies (Quebec)
2004	Longueuil, QC	Quest (Quebec)
2003	Cornerbrook, NL	McMillan Sand & Gravel (Ontario)
2002	Ottawa, ON	Huskies (Quebec)
2001	Calgary, AB	McMillan Sand & Gravel (Ontario)
2000	Halifax, NS	Huskies (Quebec)

=== Mixed ===
Mixed
Year	Host	Winner
2022	Saskatoon, SK	Broom-Shak Becancour (Quebec)
2021	NO EVENT HELD(COVID-19)	
2020	NO EVENT HELD(COVID-19)	
2019	Cornwall, ON	Broom-Shak Becancour (Quebec)
2018	Portage La Prairie, MB	Broom-Shak Becancour (Quebec)
2017	Alma, QC	Broom-Shak Becancour (Quebec)
2016	Owen Sound, ON	Misled (Ontario)
2015	Montreal, QC	Broom-Shak Becancour (Quebec)
2014	Calgary, SB	Broom-Shak Becancour (Quebec)
2013	Regina, SK	Regina silver Foxes (Saskatchewan)

=== U20 Boy's ===
U20 Boy's
Year	Host	Winner
2022	Cornwall, Ontario	Blitx (Quebec)
2021	NO EVENT HELD(COVID-19)	
2020	NO EVENT HELD(COVID-19)	
2019	Riviere du Loup, Quebec	Sting (Ontario)
2018	Owen Sound, Ontario	Sting (Ontario)
2017	Estevan, Saskatchewan	Valley Gamblers (Ontario)
2016	Arnprior, Ontario	Valley Gamblers (Ontario)
2015	Portage la Prairie, Manitoba	As St-Coeur de Marie (Quebec)
2014	Alma, Quebec	Valley Gamblers (Ontario)
2013	Cornwall, Ontario	Valley Gamblers (Ontario)
2012	St. Laurent, Quebec	Sting (Ontario)
2011	Portage La Prairie, Manitoba	Valley Gamblers (Ontario)
2010	Balgonie/White City, Saskatchewan	Clippers (Saskatchewan)
2009	Terrebonne, Quebec	Odessa Bandits (Saskatchewan)
2008	Windsor, Ontario	Briquetal (Quebec)
2007	Balgonie, Saskatchewan	Sphinx L’Assomption (Quebec)
2006	Carleton Place, Ontario	College L’Assomption (Quebec)
2005	Leduc, Alberta	College L’Assomption (Quebec)
2004	Regina, Saskatchewan	College Laval (Quebec)
2003	Joliette, Quebec	Bruno Jr. Axemen (Saskatchewan)
2002	Oak Bluff, Manitoba	Bruno Jr. Axemen (Saskatchewan)
2001	Palmerston, Ontario	Seaforth Hitmen (Ontario)
2000	Embrun, Ontario	College Laval (Quebec)

=== U20 Girl's ===
U20 Girl's
Year	Host	Winner
2022	Cornwall, Ontario	Debden Roadrunners (Saskatchewan)
2021	NO EVENT HELD(COVID-19)	
2020	NO EVENT HELD(COVID-19)	
2019	Riviere du Loup, Quebec	Palmerston Terminators (Ontario)
2018	Owen Sound, Ontario	T-Miss (Quebec)
2017	Estevan, Saskatchewan	CAJ Centre du Quebec (Quebec)
2016	Arnprior, Ontario	CAJ Centre du Quebec (Quebec)
2015	Portage la Prairie, Manitoba	Seaway Valley Devils (Ontario)
2014	Alma, Quebec	Eastern Thunder (Ontario)
2013	Cornwall, Ontario	Eastern Thunder (Ontario)
2012	St. Laurent, Quebec	Eastern Thunder (Ontario)
2011	Portage La Prairie, Manitoba	Eastern Thunder (Ontario)
2010	Balgonie/White City, Saskatchewan	Eastern Thunder (Ontario)
2009	Terrebonne, Quebec	Seaway Valley Devils (Ontario)
2008	Windsor, Ontario	Seaway Valley Devils (Ontario)
2007	Balgonie, Saskatchewan	Seaway Valley Devils (Ontario)
2006	Carleton Place, Ontario	Eastern Thunder (Ontario)
2005	Leduc, Alberta	Seaway Valley Devils (Ontario)
2004	Regina, Saskatchewan	Seaway Valley Devils (Ontario)
2003	Joliette, Quebec	Seaway Valley Devils (Ontario)
2002	Oak Bluff, Manitoba	College Stanislas (Quebec)
2001	Palmerston, Ontario	College Stanislas (Quebec)
2000	Embrun, Ontario	College Stanislas (Quebec)

== Funding ==
Broomball is recognized as one of the first 6 Canadian heritage sports and thus receives funding from Heritage Canada to the amount of $105,000. The funding is meant to develop and build the sport as it receives little sponsorship from companies, the remaining income to the sport is from membership fees and workshops. To continue to receive funding from Heritage Canada, the broomball federation must continue to actively seek sponsorship from corporate sponsors. While the sport is strongly supported by Heritage Canada it would prefer to reduce dependency in order to more readily finance other initiatives.

== See also ==
- Broomball
- List of broomball teams
- USA Broomball – Now represented by two different sporting bodies: All Elite Broomball (AEB) and the United States Broomball Association (USBA).
- Broomball Australia
- International Federation of Broomball Associations
