= Queensland Cyclones =

Australian broomball team

Queensland Cyclones logo

The Queensland Cyclones are an Australian broomball team, representing the state of Queensland at the Australian National Broomball Championships.

Players representing the Queensland Cyclones are primarily drawn from the North Queensland Broomball Association, a broomball club based in the north Queensland city of Townsville.

The Cyclones have a comparatively poor record at the National Championships when compared to the representative teams from elsewhere in Australia. Their only national title to date is the 1995 Mixed Elite title. They have finished as runners up in most divisions on a number of occasions.

== List of achievements at National Championships ==
=== Men's Elite Division ===
- Runner Up five times (1996, 1997, 1998, 2000, 2005)

=== Women's Elite Division ===
- Runner Up three times (1999 with New South Wales, 2005, 2006)

=== Mixed Elite Division ===
- Champions once (1995)
- Runner Up four times (1996, 1997, 2003, 2005)

=== Mixed Intermediate Division ===
- Runner Up once (2006)

== See also ==
- Australian National Broomball Championships
