= Zyklon (disambiguation) =

Zyklon is a Norwegian industrial blackened death metal band.

Zyklon may also refer to:

== Chemicals ==
- Zyklon A, a pesticide originally known as Zyklon
  - Zyklon B, a pesticide ultimately used by Nazi Germany in gas chambers

== Arts and entertainment ==
- Zyklon, a roller coaster manufactured by Pinfari
- Zyklon (comics), a supervillain from DC Comics

== See also ==
- Cyklon, German car
- Cyclone, weather phenomenon
