= Chain-link fencing =

Type of woven metal fencing

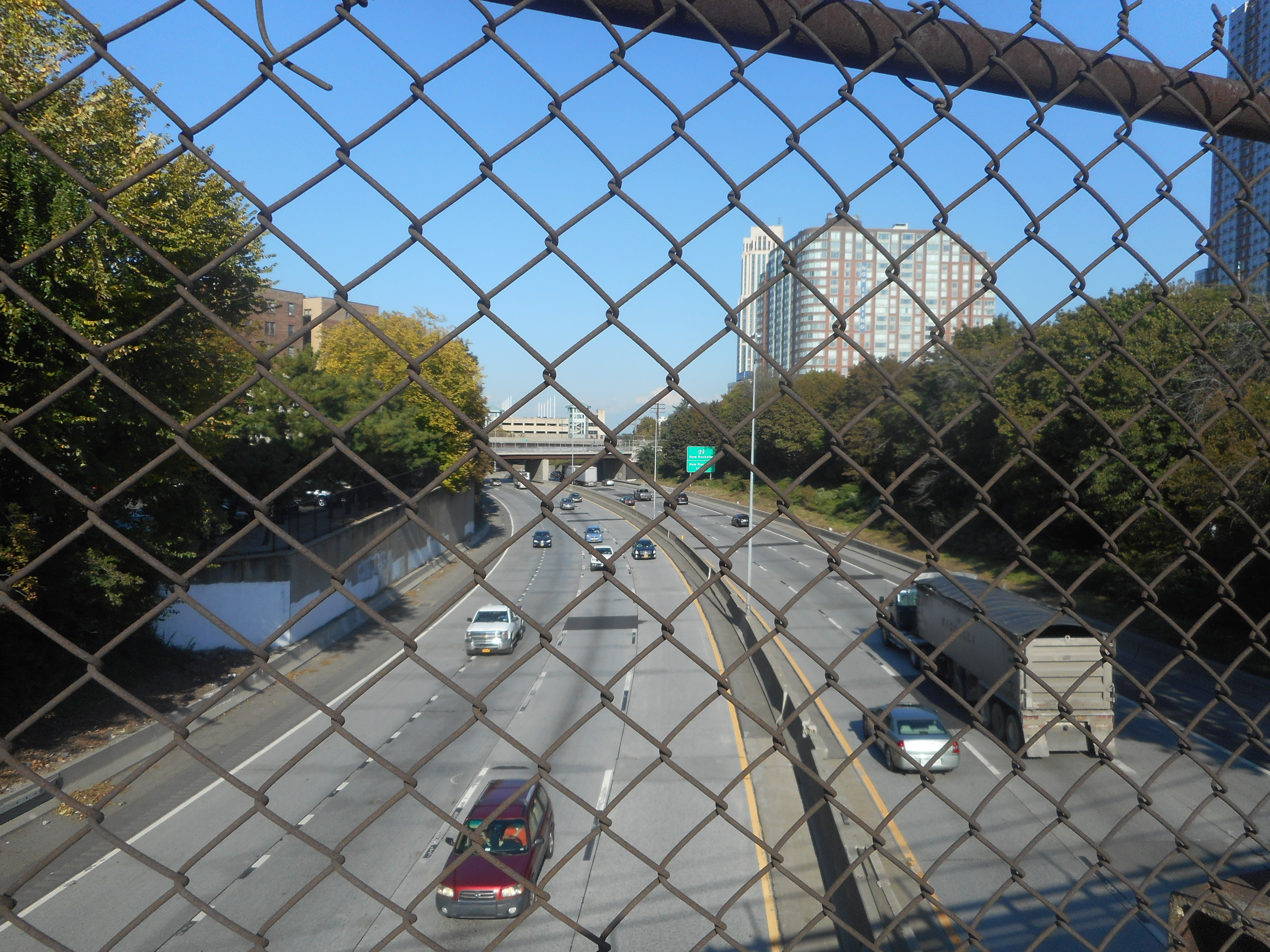
Chain-link fencing showing the diamond patterning

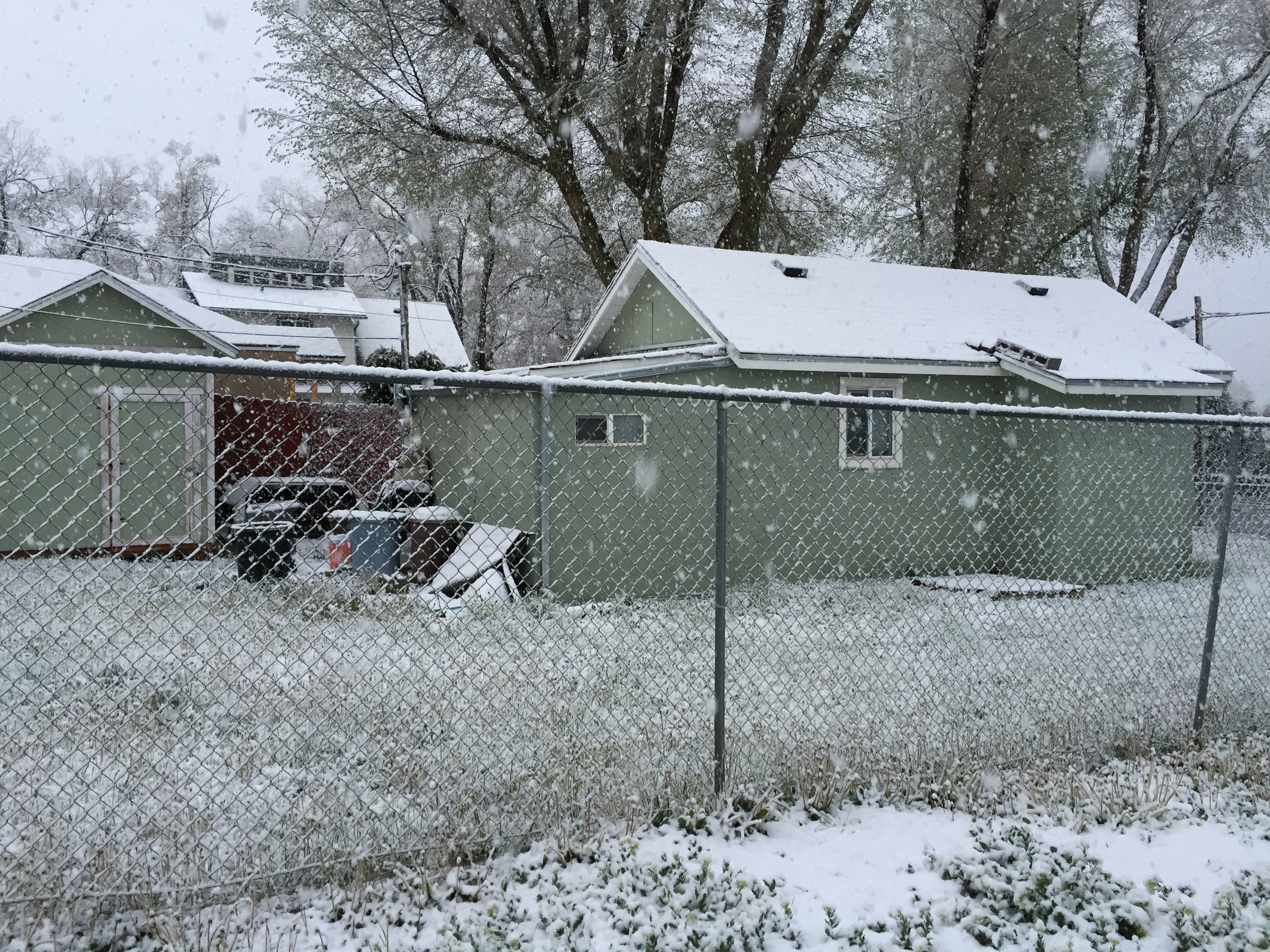
A chain-link fence bordering a residential property

A chain-link fence (also referred to as wire netting, wire-mesh fence, chain-wire fence, cyclone fence, hurricane fence, or diamond-mesh fence) is a type of woven fence usually made from galvanized or linear low-density polyethylene-coated steel wire. The wires run vertically and are bent into a zigzag pattern so that each "zig" hooks with the wire immediately on one side and each "zag" with the wire immediately on the other. This forms the characteristic diamond pattern seen in this type of fence.

== Development of chain-link fencing ==
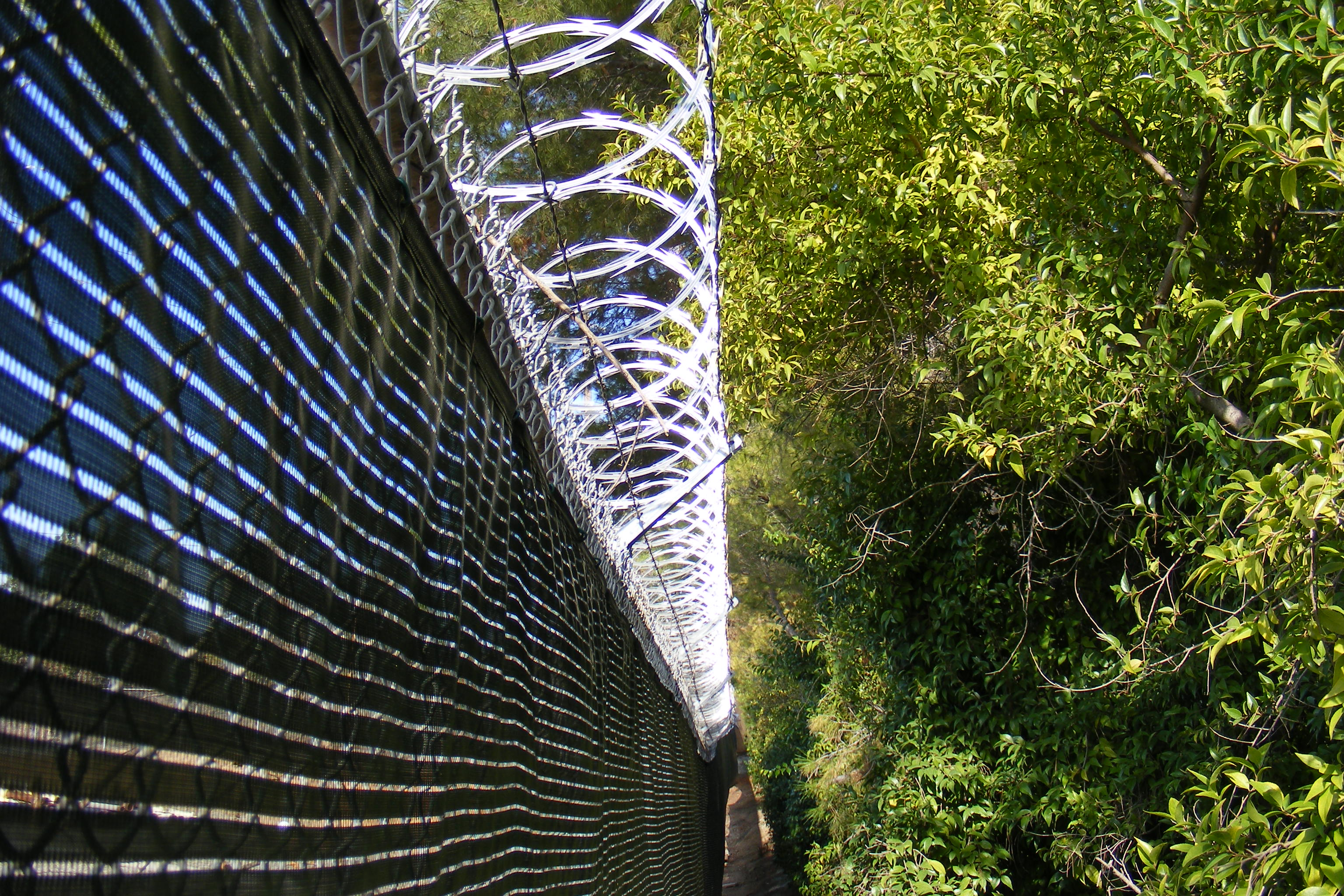
A chain-link privacy fence topped with razor wire protecting a utility power substation

In the United Kingdom, the firm of Barnard, Bishop & Barnards was established in Norwich to produce chain-link fencing by machine. The process was developed by Charles Barnard in 1844 based on cloth weaving machines (up until that time, Norwich had a long history of cloth manufacture). In the mid-1890s, the American Chain Link Fence Company in Medford, Massachusetts, was the first company in the United States to patent an "exclusive manufacturing process of continuous wire fabric" thanks to a patent by founder Guy Mafera which he first used to make spring beds. While sources vary on when Mafera first patented the method of forming chain link fence, his brother, Frank J. Mafera, patented a method of "forming wire fence fabric" in 1930 which made chain link fence safe and practical for residential use. It "eliminate[d] each ragged selvage, particularly at the top of the fence, without sacrificing anything of the essential strength and rigidity, of the fence itself, thus to avoid danger of injury to hands or clothing." Frank J. Mafera first sold this type of fencing from his company the Barnyard Fence Company in Raymond, New Hampshire, and his brother sold and produced the fencing at the American Chain Link Fence Company in Medford. Mafera's patent was updated in 1952, but expired in 1969 and is now used in the production of most chain link fencing.

== Sizes and uses ==
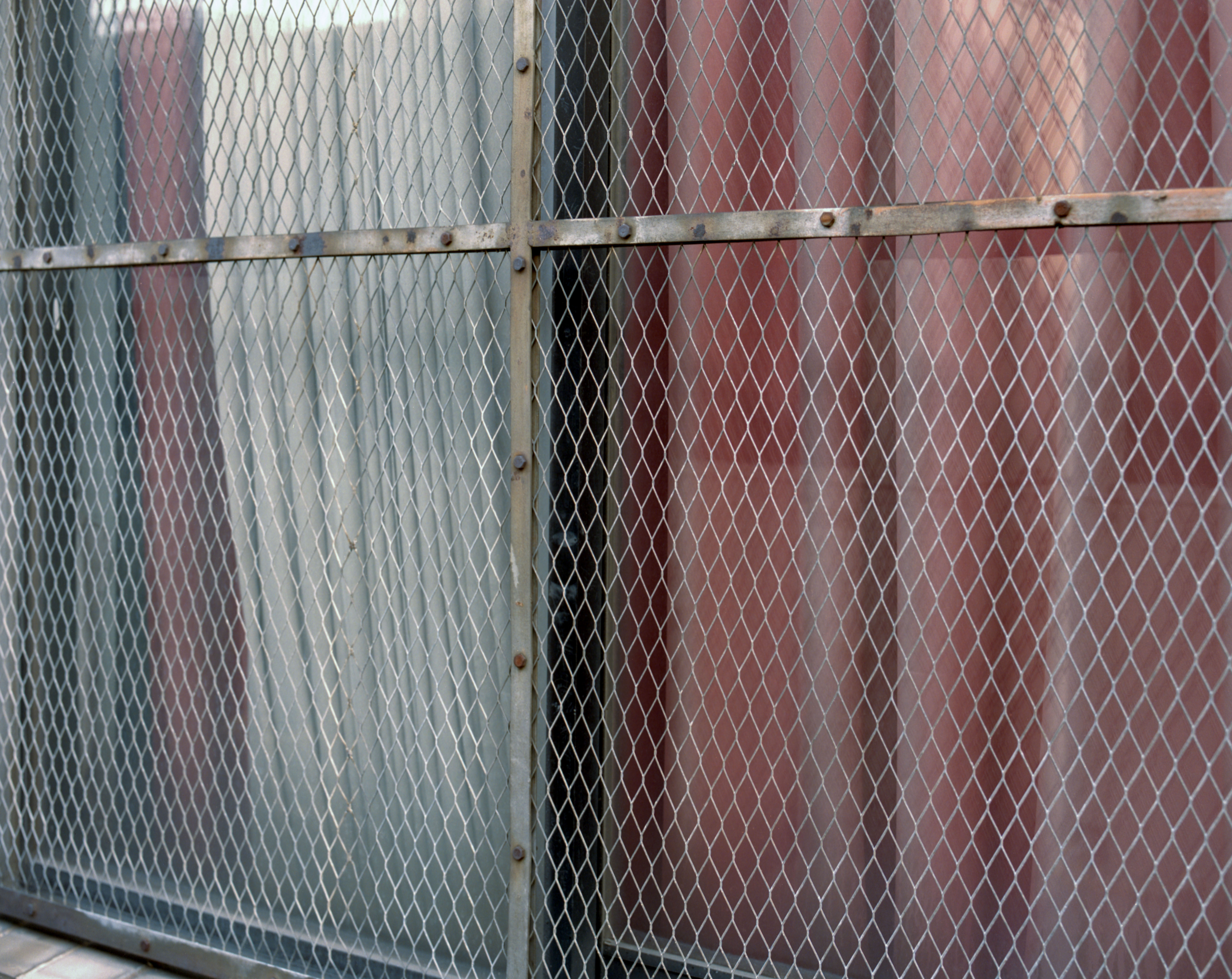
A chain-link fence allows light to pass through while protecting windows.

In the United States, fencing usually comes in 20-foot (6.1 m) or 50-foot (15 m) rolls, which can be joined by "unscrewing" one of the end wires and then "screwing" it back in so that it hooks both pieces. Common heights include one-foot increments from 3 feet (0.91 m) to 8 feet (2.4 m), and other heights including 3 feet 6 inches (1.07 m), 10 feet (3.0 m), and 12 feet (3.7 m) although almost any height is possible. Mesh is commonly 9, 11, or 11 1/2 wire gauge. Mesh length can also vary based on need, with the standard diamond size being 2 inches (5.1 cm).

For tennis courts and ballparks, the most popular height is 10 or 12 feet (3.0 or 3.7 m). Tennis courts often use a diamond size of 1.75 inches (4.4 cm), as measured flat side to flat side, so that power hitters cannot lodge the ball in the fence.

The popularity of chain-link fence is from its relatively low cost and that the open weave does not obscure sunlight from either side of the fence. A chain-link fence can be made semi-opaque by using fence inserts in the mesh. Allowing ivy to grow up the fence and interweave itself is also popular.

== Installation ==
The installation of a chain-link fence involves setting posts into the ground and attaching the fence to them. The posts may be steel tubing, timber or concrete, and may be driven into the ground or set in concrete. End, corner, or gate posts, commonly referred to as "terminal posts", must be set on a concrete footing or otherwise anchored to prevent leaning under the tension of a stretched fence. Posts set between the terminal posts are called "line posts" and are set at intervals not to exceed 10 feet. The installer attaches the fence at one end, stretches it, and attaches it at the other, easily removing the excess by "unscrewing" a wire. In many cases, the installer stretches a bottom tension wire, sometimes referred to as "coil wire", between terminal posts to help minimize the in and out movement that occurs at the bottom of the chain-link mesh between posts. Top horizontal rails are used on most chain-link fences, although not necessary if the terminal posts are braced correctly. A top tension wire may be used in this situation. Bottom rails may be added in place of bottom tension wires, and for taller fences, 10 feet or more, intermediate horizontal rails are often added. Finally, the installer ties the fence to the line posts and rails with steel or aluminum wire with a hook on one end called “fence ties”. The bottom tension wire should be secured to the line posts and the chain-link mesh "hog ringed" to the tension wire 2' on center.

== Manufacturing ==
The manufacturing of chain-link fencing is called weaving. A metal wire, often galvanized to reduce corrosion, is pulled along a rotating long and flat blade, thus creating a somewhat flattened spiral. The spiral continues to rotate past the blade and winds its way through the previous spiral that is already part of the fence. When the spiral reaches the far end of the fence, the spiral is cut near the blade. Next, the spiral is pressed flat, and the entire fence is moved up, ready for the next cycle. The end of every second spiral overlaps the end of every first spiral. The machine clamps both ends and gives them a few twists. This makes the links permanent.

An improved version of the weaving machine winds two wires around the blade at once to create a double helix. One of the spirals is woven through the last spiral that is already part of the fence. This improvement allows the process to advance twice as fast.

== Notable uses ==
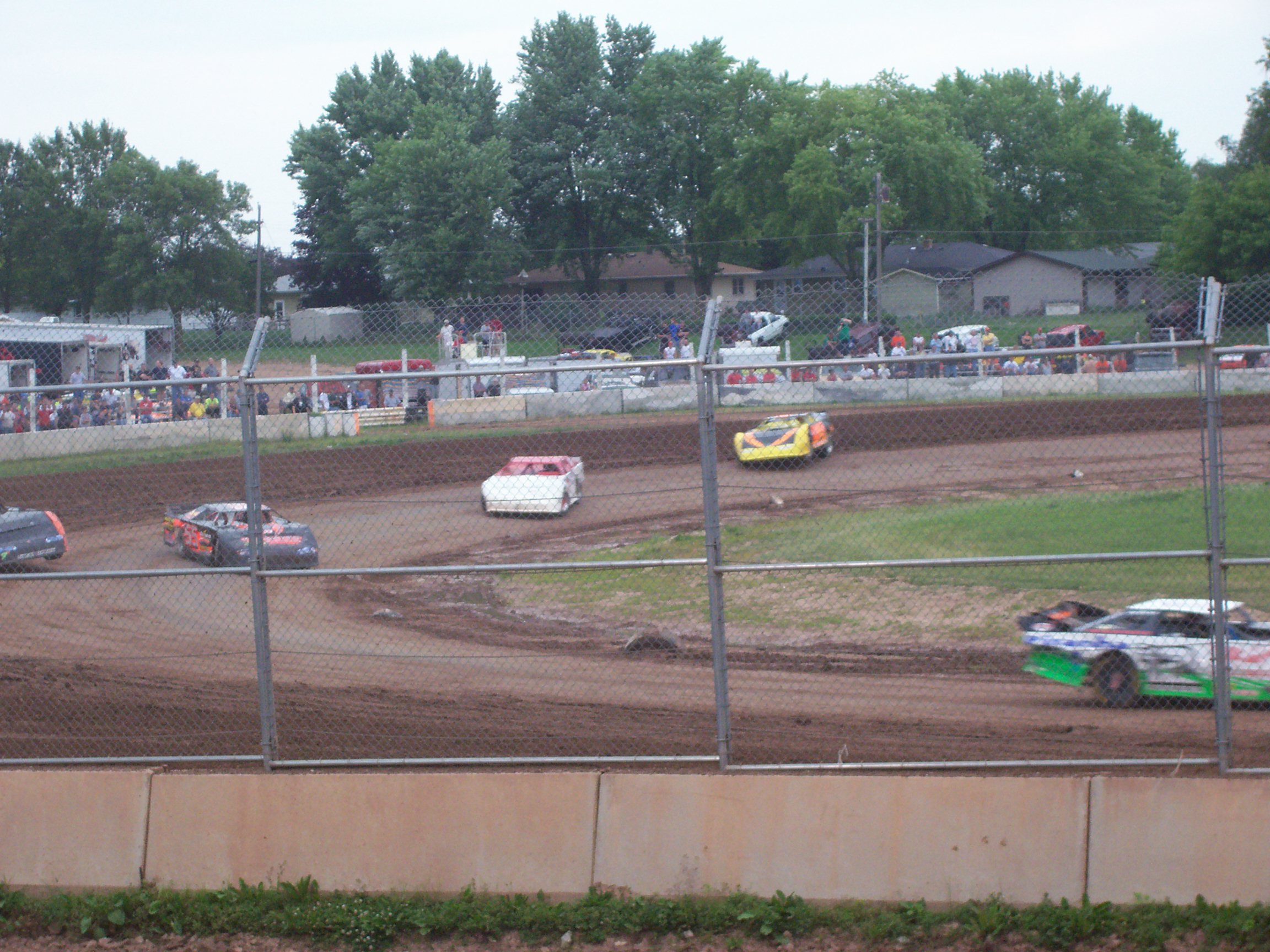
Chain-link fencing at an American short track

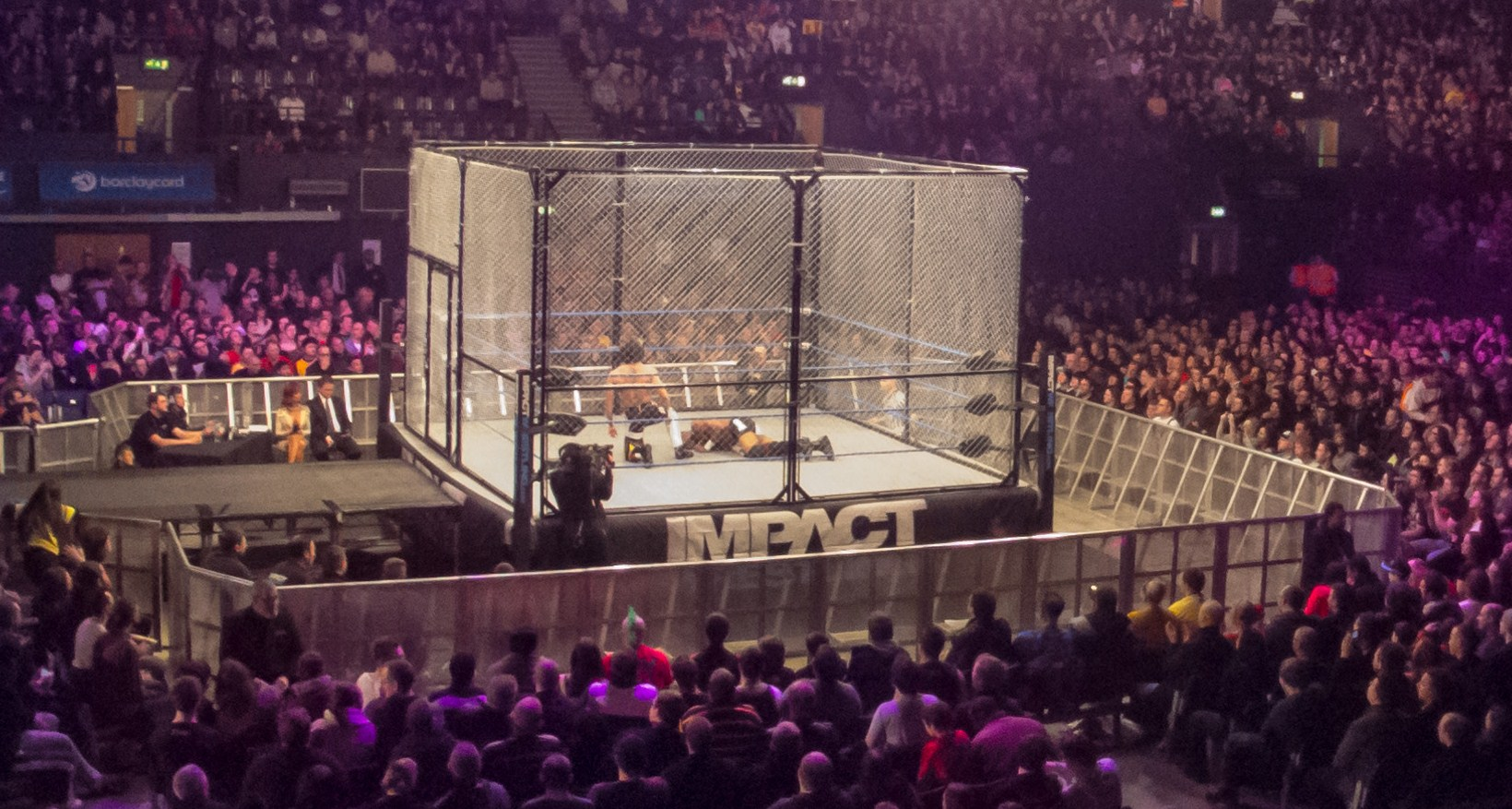
Chain-link, steel cage as used in an Impact Wrestling professional wrestling match

- Used to notable effect in the Gehry Residence by Frank Gehry
- In professional wrestling, several wrestling match variations require that chain-link fencing surround the ring in an open "cage" style. Most popularly, in the steel cage match variation and the larger, closed cage match type specific to WWE, Hell in a Cell.
- Backstops used in baseball and softball fields
- Before the advent of gravel trap in the later half of the 1980s, racetracks used chain-link fencing as catch fences to slow out-of-control cars before they hit barriers. In the 2000s, American dirt tracks still used them.
- London fitted many parks with chain-link fencing during the Second World War after removing the original iron and steel railings as scrap for the war effort. (Many are now being replaced.)

== See also ==
- Chicken wire
- Cyclone Fence and Gate
- Expanded metal
- Temporary fencing
- Wire gauze
