= Cyclone (nickname) =

Cyclone is a nickname for:

- Cy Young (1867–1955), American Hall-of-Fame baseball pitcher whose nickname "Cyclone" was shortened to "Cy"
- Cyclone Taylor (1884–1979), Canadian Hall-of-Fame hockey player
- Fabiano Aoki (born 1978), Brazilian kickboxer
- Cyclone Miller (1858–1916), American Major League Baseball pitcher
- Cyclone Ryan (1866–1917), Major League Baseball pitcher and first baseman for 12 games
- Cyclone Joe Williams (1886–1951), American baseball pitcher in the Negro leagues

== See also ==
- Hurricane (nickname)
