= French ship Cyclone =

At least three ships of the French Navy have been named Cyclone:

- French torpedo boat Cyclone, a Cyclone-class torpedo boat launched in 1898 and struck in 1920.
- French destroyer Cyclone (1925), a Bourrasque-class destroyer launched in 1925 and scuttled in 1940.
- French destroyer Cyclone (1946), a Le Hardi-class destroyer launched in 1939 as Lansquenet, scuttled in 1942 but salvaged by Italy in 1943 and renamed FR34. Subsequently seized by Germany and renamed TA34 (II). Retroceded to France in 1945 she was renamed Cyclone in 1946 and scrapped in 1958.
