= Cyclone Tools =

Cyclone Tools was an Australian manufacturing company, founded in Melbourne in the late 19th century. The Cyclone brand is now owned by the AMES Companies, owned by Griffon Corporation of the US.

== History ==
Some time around 1885, Leonard Tasman Chambers (c. 1848 – 23 October 1917) and William Eastwood Thompson (c. 1867 – 27 November 1952) founded the Bee-Keepers' Supply Company with offices at 18 Franklin Street, West Melbourne (before 1900 often spelled "Franklyn") near Elizabeth Street. Their attention was drawn to an advertisement from the Cyclone Fence Company of America, which made a wire-weaving machine, and saw a business opportunity. In 1898, they were granted patent 8812 for an improved form of wire fencing. with crimping incorporated into the wire, giving it additional resilience, and founded the Cyclone Woven Wire Company at 128 Franklin Street, Melbourne, on the Swanston Street corner.

Crimped wire roll

The fencing, which was supplied in 330 feet (100 m) (i.e. 5-chain) rolls, underwent further improvements, reducing the number of posts required. The company developed other products and moved to 461 Swanston Street. Expansion was rapid. Within three years manufacturing capacity in Melbourne was doubled, and manufactories were opened in Sydney, Brisbane, and Christchurch, New Zealand. Equipment and licences to manufacture under their patent was made available to agents.

Cyclone Sanitary Bedstead 1911

The company gained the rights to a self-opening gate, and added it to their range of farm gates. Male members of the Chambers family were added to the management structure of the company and it prospered. Buzacott & Co. were appointed their Sydney agents and opened a factory in Balmain, New South Wales.

Diversified products include Cyclone sanitary beds with chain-link mattresses in Western Australia from 1911.

In 1914, the Cyclone Company of Australia was formed to take over the business and assets of Cyclone Woven Wire Fence Co. In 1925, its name was changed to Cyclone Fence and Gate Company. The largest shareholder was Bennett and Chambers Pty Ltd.

The company's range of fences expanded. To the original spring wire design, best suited to sheep paddocks, was added the "Stiff Stay" range, best suited to pig pens, with "ring locks" binding the horizontal and vertical wires. The chain-link fence, that is today recognised as a "Cyclone fence", appeared around 1928.

In 1941, with Australia deeply committed to World War II, Cyclone absorbed Miller's Forgings at 330 Johnston and Harper streets, Abbotsford, Victoria, forming a new entity, Miller-Cyclone Forgings Pty Ltd, to make knives for the shoe trade, dies and, critically, defence work. Directors of the new entity were P. C. Miller, James Ramsden, H. S. Chambers, A. J. Chambers, and L. S. Chambers. In 1947, their principal factory was at Gibb Street, Abbotsford.

In 1947, Cyclone Pty was restructured as a public company, Cyclone Company of Australia Limited and Henry Septimus Chambers (c. 1883 – 6 November 1948), a cousin of Clarence Henry Chambers, was appointed its first chairman.

Their scaffolding subsidiary, Cyclone Double-Grip Scaffolding Pty Ltd dates from c. 1950.

A new factory opened at Geebung, Queensland in 1955 This brought the number of factories owned by the company to seven, the others being in Rosebery, New South Wales, Woodville, South Australia, East Perth, Western Australia, Hyde Park, Queensland, and Bentleigh, Victoria, as well as the original factory at Abbotsford, Victoria. Screen wire was fabricated only at Bentleigh.

Cyclone became a proprietary company in 1947, with H. S. Chambers as chairman. Other directors were C. H. Chambers, A. L. Chambers, R. S. Chambers, A. J. Chambers, L. S. Chambers, and E. C. Milner. They embarked on a program of expansion.

In 1955 the factory at Rocklea, Queensland, was enlarged by manager W. "Lex" Ford. A new wire cloth factory was opened at McKinnon, Victoria in 1949. A factory at Innaloo, Western Australia, was opened in 1965.

In 1976, Cyclone was acquired by Boral and the business became Boral Cyclone Limited. In 1993, Boral spun off its manufacturing subsidiaries, including Cyclone, into Azon Limited, which was sold in 1996 to the Illinois Tool Works (ITW).

In May 2014, the ITW Australian garden and tool division, which then included brands such as Cyclone, Trojan, Supercraft, and Nylex, was sold to the AMES Companies, owned by US company Griffon Corporation, for approximately US$36 million.

In October 2026, Cyclone closed its factory at Wonthaggi, Victoria, ending 75 years of local production. The timber handle factory in Grafton, New South Wales, was closed a month earlier, with production of Cyclone tools shifting overseas.

== Personnel ==
- Arthur John Chambers (c. 1876 – 3 September 1962), a nephew of L. T. Chambers, and prominent Rotarian. He was managing director of the Cyclone Fence and Gate Co. from 1912. He succeeded H. S. Chambers as chairman of directors in 1948. He became chairman in 1950, retired in 1961.
- A. Lance Chambers ( – ) was a director. He succeeded A. J. Chambers as chairman in 1961.
- Clarence Henry Chambers (c. 1893 – 7 November 1949) was manager of the NSW branch for 15 years before being made managing director in 1948. He was succeeded by Reginald S. Chambers.
- Clement Stodart Chambers (1871 in SA – 14 April 1934) director and works manager; father of L. S. C. and R. S. C.
- Geoffrey Stoddart Chambers ( – c. 25 July 1987) son of H. S. C.
- Gordon Henry Chambers (died 11 June 1980) son of H. S. C.
- Henry Septimus Chambers (c. 1883 – 6 November 1948), cousin of Clarence Henry Chambers, and father of G. H. C, G. S. C. and R. S. C., all Cyclone employees. He was the first chairman when company converted to public company in 1947.
- J. T. Chambers (joint chairman in 1899) was uncle of C. H. C.
- Leonard Stodart Chambers ( – 3 May 1996) was technical director
- Leonard Tasman Chambers (c. 1848 – 23 October 1917) co-founder with W. E. Thompson.
- Reginald Stodart "Rex" Chambers (1905 – 26 January 1987) was managing director from 1949
- Russell Sydney Chambers (died 29 August 1987) son of H. S. C.
- William Alexander David "Lex" Ford (5 June 1913 – March 1992)
- Percy Clarence Miller (c. 1891 – 14 August 1974) knifemaker
- E. C. Milner
- James Ramsden
- William Eastwood Thompson (c. 1867 – 27 November 1952) co-founder with L. T. Chambers
