= USA Broomball =

- USA Broomball logo
- Sport: Broomball
- Jurisdiction: National
- Affiliation: International Federation of Broomball Associations
- Closure date: Prior to 2020 season
- (United States)

USA Broomball is the former official governing body for the sport of broomball in the United States and was an organization recognized by the International Federation of Broomball Associations (IFBA). It folded prior to the 2020 season due to financial mismanagement. Two new American broomball organizations have since formed, All Elite Broomball (AEB) and the United States Broomball Association (USBA).

USA Broomball was responsible for sanctioning tournaments and leagues, training and certifying officials, and recognizing broomball governing bodies for individual states in the USA. It also organized and oversaw the annual National Championship tournament, held in Minnesota in odd-numbered years and in a different state with a recognized state organization in even-numbered years. National championships were contested in Men's Class A, Men's Class B, Men's Class C, Men's Class D, Co-Rec, and Collegiate divisions in 2007. USA Broomball took responsibility for placing teams in the appropriate division and teams were not allowed to pick up players from higher-division teams for the National Championships.

== History ==
Until 2020, the American broomball organization that was recognized by the IFBA was USA Broomball. USA Broomball folded prior to the 2020 season due to financial mismanagement. In its wake, two organizations were formed, All Elite Broomball (AEB) and the United States Broomball Association (USBA).

USA Broomball was responsible for sanctioning tournaments, training and certifying officials, and recognizing state governing bodies regarding broomball. The states that had governing bodies recognized by USA Broomball included Colorado, Iowa, Michigan, Minnesota, Nebraska, New York, North Dakota, and Ohio. USA Broomball also organized and oversaw the annual USA Broomball National Championships. In odd-numbered years, Minnesota (the unofficial U.S. broomball capital and home to the majority of broomball leagues and teams in the country) hosted the National Championships. In even-numbered years, a different state with an officially recognized state organization hosted the tournament.

== State organizations ==
The states that had governing bodies recognized by USA Broomball included Colorado, Iowa, Michigan, Minnesota, Nebraska, New York, North Dakota, and Ohio.

The following states have currently recognized governing bodies:

States with governing bodies
State	Governing body
Colorado	Colorado Broomball Association
Indiana	
Iowa	Iowa Broomball
Maryland	Baltimore Broomball Club
Michigan	
Minnesota	Minnesota Sports Federation
Nebraska	Omaha Broomball
North Dakota	
Ohio	
New York	Adirondack Broomball
Pennsylvania	Pittsburgh Broomball Club

== National Championships sites ==
- 1999: Bloomington, Minnesota
- 2000: Chaska, Minnesota
- 2001-2003: Rosemount, Minnesota
- 2004: Omaha, Nebraska
- 2005: Rosemount, Minnesota
- 2006: Lakewood, Ohio
- 2007: Blaine, Minnesota
- 2008: Fargo, North Dakota
- 2009: Richfield, Minnesota
- 2010: Blaine, Minnesota
- 2011: Duluth, Minnesota
- 2012: Blaine, Minnesota
- 2013: Oxford, Ohio
- 2014: Blaine, Minnesota
- 2015: Fargo, North Dakota
- 2016: Minneapolis, Richfield, Minnesota
- 2017: Delmont, Pennsylvania
- 2018: Blaine, Minnesota
- 2019: Fargo, North Dakota
- 2020 Nationals was to be held at New Hope, Minnesota, but was cancelled due to the COVID-19 pandemic.

== 2016 National Championship results ==
- Men's Class A: Champions - Barrie's Tavern
- Runners-up - Nomadic Horde
- Men's Class B: Champions - Watkins Legion
- Runners-up - Minnesota Bombers
- Men's Class C: Champions - OG's
- Runners-up - Dayton Bombers
- Men's Class D: Champions - Champion Awards
- Runners-up - University of Nebraska
- Men's Collegiate: Champions - Miami University
- Women's Class A: Champions - Arctic Blast
- Runners-up - Tracy's
- Women's Class B: Champions - Broomstormers
- Runners-up - Flying V's
- Co-Rec A: Champions - Revels Repair
- Runners-up - Old Town Tavern
- Co-Rec B: Champions - Bi-Partisans
- Runners-up - Kutters

== See also ==
- Broomball
- List of broomball teams
- Broomball Canada
- Broomball Australia
- International Federation of Broomball Associations
