= Broomball Australia =

Governing body for broomball in Australia

- Sport: Broomball
- Jurisdiction: Australia
- Founded: 2004; 22 years ago
- Affiliation: International Federation of Broomball Associations
- Headquarters: Canberra
- President: Paul Arandt
- Vice president: Andrew D'Arcy
- Secretary: Anthony Micallef

Official website
- www.broomball.au
- Other key staff: Treasurer: Mark Arandt
- (Australia)

Broomball Australia is the national governing body for the ice sport of broomball in Australia. It was incorporated in October 2004 after a number of years unofficially operating under other varied names, such as the Australian Broomball Association. Broomball Australia is a member of the International Federation of Broomball Associations (IFBA).

Broomball Australia sanctions the Australian National Broomball Championships, an annual tournament to determine Australia's national broomball champions.

As of 2006 Broomball Australia had four full members and one associate member. Full members are granted full voting rights within the association with two delegates appointed to the National Council, the decision-making arm of the body. Associate members are officially recognised by Broomball Australia, but do not have any voting rights.

According to its official website, Broomball Australia's purpose is to develop and promote the sport of broomball in Australia to gain acceptance, recognition and support in the wider sporting community.

== Organization of Broomball Australia ==
Broomball Australia is run by the National Council, which is made up of two voting members from each full member association. All motions are passed through, and debated and actioned by votes from the National Council.

From the National Council, an executive committee is elected to run the day-to-day operations of the organisation. One delegate from each full member association is elected to the executive committee in one of the following positions: President, vice-president, Secretary, Treasurer. Delegates are elected for a term of one year at the Annual General Meeting of Broomball Australia.

=== Current members ===
The current members are:

Current members
Organization	Member status
Australian Capital Territory Broomball Association (ACTBA)	Full member
Broomball Association of South Australia (BASA)	Full member
North Queensland Broomball Association (NQBA)	Full member
New South Wales Broomball Association (NSWBA)	Full member
Coffs Harbour Ice Broomball Club	Associate member
Queensland Broomball Association (QBA)	Associate member

== National Championships ==
Broomball Australia sanctions the Australian National Broomball Championships, an annual tournament to determine Australia's national broomball champions.

== See also ==
- Broomball
- List of broomball teams
- Broomball Canada
- USA Broomball – Now represented by two different sporting bodies: All Elite Broomball (AEB) and the United States Broomball Association (USBA).
- International Federation of Broomball Associations
