= International Federation of Broomball Associations =

International organisation for governing Broomball

- International Federation of Broomball Associations logo
- Abbreviation: IFBA
- Formation: 1998; 28 years ago
- Type: Sports federation
- Legal status: Governing body of Broomball
- Purpose: Sport governance
- Headquarters: Canada
- Region served: Worldwide
- Official languages: English
- Website: IFBA

The International Federation of Broomball Associations (IFBA), formally established in 1998, is the world governing body for the sport of broomball.

Based in Canada, the IFBA is responsible for promoting the sport globally, organizing the biennial World Broomball Championships. It also administers the sport's official rulebook and coaching and officiating programs.

== History of the IFBA ==
The International Federation of Broomball Associations (IFBA) was founded by Rick Przybysz after a visit to his home by a team from Australia, who were travelling across Canada playing games in various locations back in 1988 (they actually camped on his front lawn) where discussions chanced the possibility of getting Broomball into the winter olympics amongst other ideas for the sport.

Mr.Przybysz became the IFBA's first President holding that position until 2014. The very first Secretary General was an Australian.

== Board of directors ==
The day-to-day operations of the IFBA are run by the Board, a body of volunteer individuals elected by the sport's member associations.

The current Board of Directors is:

- President – Marc Desparios (Canada)
- Vice-president (Operations): currently vacant (acting in vacant position) Marc Desparois (Canada)
- Vice-president (Technical): Conrad Morneau (Canada)
- General Secretary: Alan Jabs (Australia)
- Treasurer – Robert Horvat (Canada)
- Referee-in-Chief: Doug Nixon (Canada)
- Technical Director: Chris Pilon (Canada)

Additionally there is a Board of Governors which meets on a timely basis. The Board of Governors is made up of representatives from each officially recognised member country of the IFBA and it is these Governors who from instruction from their respective member associations vote in the IFBA Board of Directors in accordance to the registered not for profit constitution. The IFBA was registered as a Not for Profit Organisation in 2013 after a major update of its documentation to comply with recent changes to Canadian association law. The IFBA is registered as an entity in Canada.

== Member Associations of IFBA ==
The following countries have broomball programs recognized by IFBA, though they may not necessarily be members of the international body.

=== Americas ===
- Canada – Broomball Canada
- United States of America – (formerly USA Broomball) All Elite Broomball (AEB) and the United States Broomball Association (USBA).

=== Europe ===
- Austria
- France – France Broomball
- United Kingdom – UK Broomball
- Germany
- Italy – Comitato Italiano Broomball
- Russia
- Slovenia – Association of Slovenian Broomball
- Switzerland – Association Suisse de Broomball

=== Asia & Oceania ===
- Australia – Broomball Australia
- Japan – Japan Broomball Association
- India – Broomball Association (India) – BAI

=== Expansion countries ===
In addition there are a number of countries that the IFBA is looking to take the game to, including:

- Belgium
- China
- Finland
- Greenland
- Iceland
- India
- Netherlands
- New Zealand
- Norway
- South Korea
- Sweden
- United Kingdom

== World championships ==
The IFBA is responsible for facilitating the World Broomball Championships, held biennially (every two years) in international locations using the skills and expertise of various host cities and member associations. As the vast majority of broomball players and teams are based in Canada or The USA, most of the championships to date have been held in this part of the world.

Traditionally World Championships see teams enter from Canada, United States, Italy, Japan, Switzerland, France and Australia. Teams representing Austria, Slovenia and Germany, have also taken part but due to limited player numbers and broomball programs these nations are not able to attend each World Championship. Australia, Japan and Canada have sent teams to every World Championship.

== European Championships ==
As part of growing and developing the sport of Broomball the IFBA has encourage the European-based member associations to hold European Nationals in the odd numbered years. The formation of the European Broomball Association oversaw the most recent European Nationals in late 2017 in the northern Italian region of Egna/Neumarkt Past events have also been held in Slovenia and Italy.

== Pacific Rim Tournament ==
The growth of the sport of Broomball across the globe led to member association Broomball Australia running the IFBA sanctioned satellite event "The Pacific Rim" tournament. Mostly attended by teams from across Australia there has also been some interest shown by teams from Canada and Japan.

== See also ==
- Broomball Canada
- Broomball Australia
- USA Broomball – Now represented by two different sporting bodies: All Elite Broomball (AEB) and the United States Broomball Association (USBA).
