= Broomball =

Winter team sport

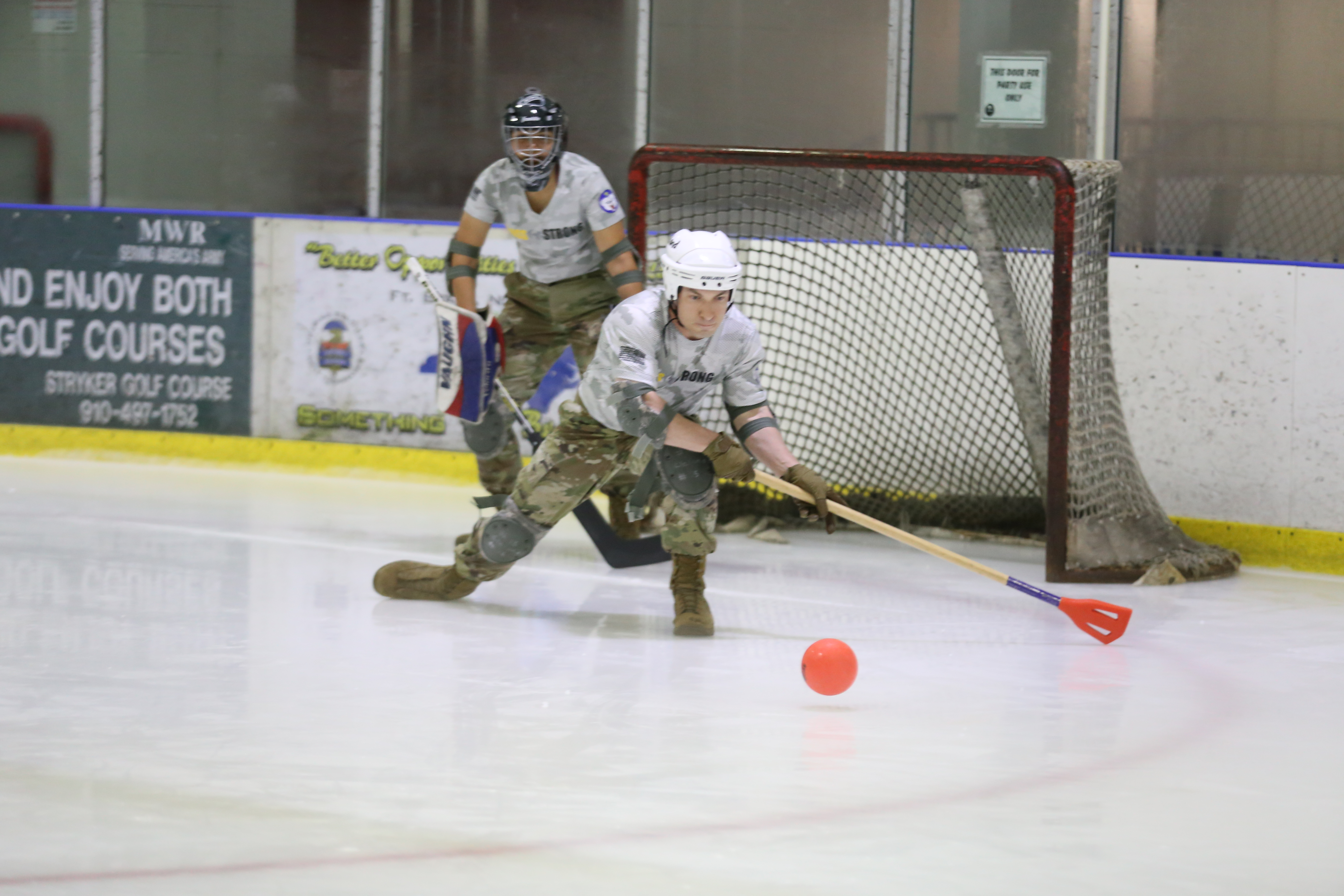
- Indoor broomball tournament
- Highest governing body: International Federation of Broomball Associations
- First played: Modern game: 19th century Canada

Characteristics
- Contact: Yes and no; varies depending on country, league, and location
- Team members: 2 forwards; 2 defencemen; 1 centre; 1 goalie
- Type: Male, female, and mixed divisions; Team sport; Winter sport
- Equipment: Large ball or broomball ball; Broomstick or broomball stick; Boots, shoes, or broomball shoes; Protective gear (sometimes)
- Venue: Standard Canadian ice hockey rink with broomball markings

Presence
- Olympic: No
- Paralympic: No
- World Games: No

Broomball is a both a recreational and organized competitive winter and ball sport played on ice or snow. It is played either indoors or outdoors, depending on the climate and location. It is most popularly played in Canada and the United States.

Unlike most winter team sports played on ice, organized broomball does not use ice skates. Player footwear for formal play consists of shoes created specifically for broomball which are designed to improve a player's traction on the ice. Though the sport can be played outdoors on snow, organized broomball in the 21st century is primarily played on an ice hockey rink.

Players hit a ball around the ice or snow with a stick. Regardless of whether the broomball stick used by players is a literal broom or a conventional broomball stick with a molded paddle-shaped end, the stick is simply called a "broom." The broom may have a wooden or aluminum shaft and has a rubber-molded triangular head similar in shape to that of a regular broom (or, originally, an actual corn broom with the bristles either cut off or covered with tape or another restricting material). Players wear special rubber-soled shoes instead of skates, and the ice is prepared in such a way that it is smooth and dry to improve traction. The ball used differs based on location: The indoor ball is smooth while the outdoor ball has ridges and resembles a small soccer ball.

In a game of broomball there are two teams, each consisting of six players: a goaltender and five others. The object of the game is to score more goals than the opponent. Goals are scored by hitting the ball into the opponent's net using a traditional broom or the more conventional paddle-shaped stick designed for the sport. Tactics and plays are similar to those used in sports such as ice hockey, roller hockey and floorball. The sport uses its own offside rules in both International Federation of Broomball Associations (IFBA) rules and American broomball rules, but both differ. While ice hockey goal nets are sometimes used, a regulation-sized broomball net is considerably larger by comparison. IFBA sanctioned games use a 5-by-7-foot (1.5 m × 2.1 m) net, while American broomball uses 6-by-8-foot (1.8 m × 2.4 m) nets.

The sport involves organized competitions and events run by its international governing body, the IFBA. The national organization in Canada is Broomball Canada while in the United States the two main organizations are All Elite Broomball (AEB) and the United States Broomball Association (USBA). Every two years the IFBA holds the IFBA World Broomball Championships (also known as the Challenge Cup), an international event with teams from around the world. Historically, the championships have been dominated by the North American teams.

A similar game called Moscow broomball is played in Russia.

== Gameplay ==
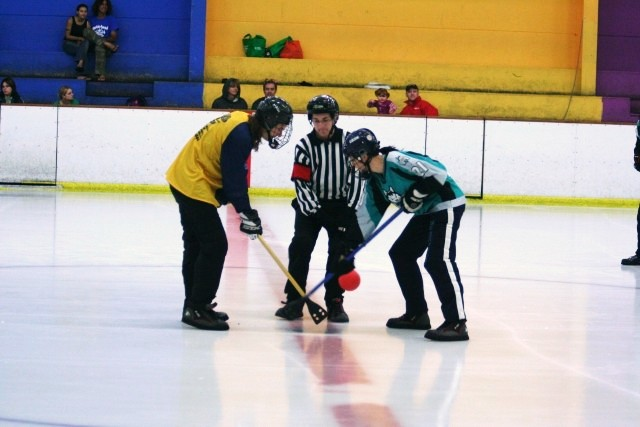
A game of broomball begins with a face-off

Game action.

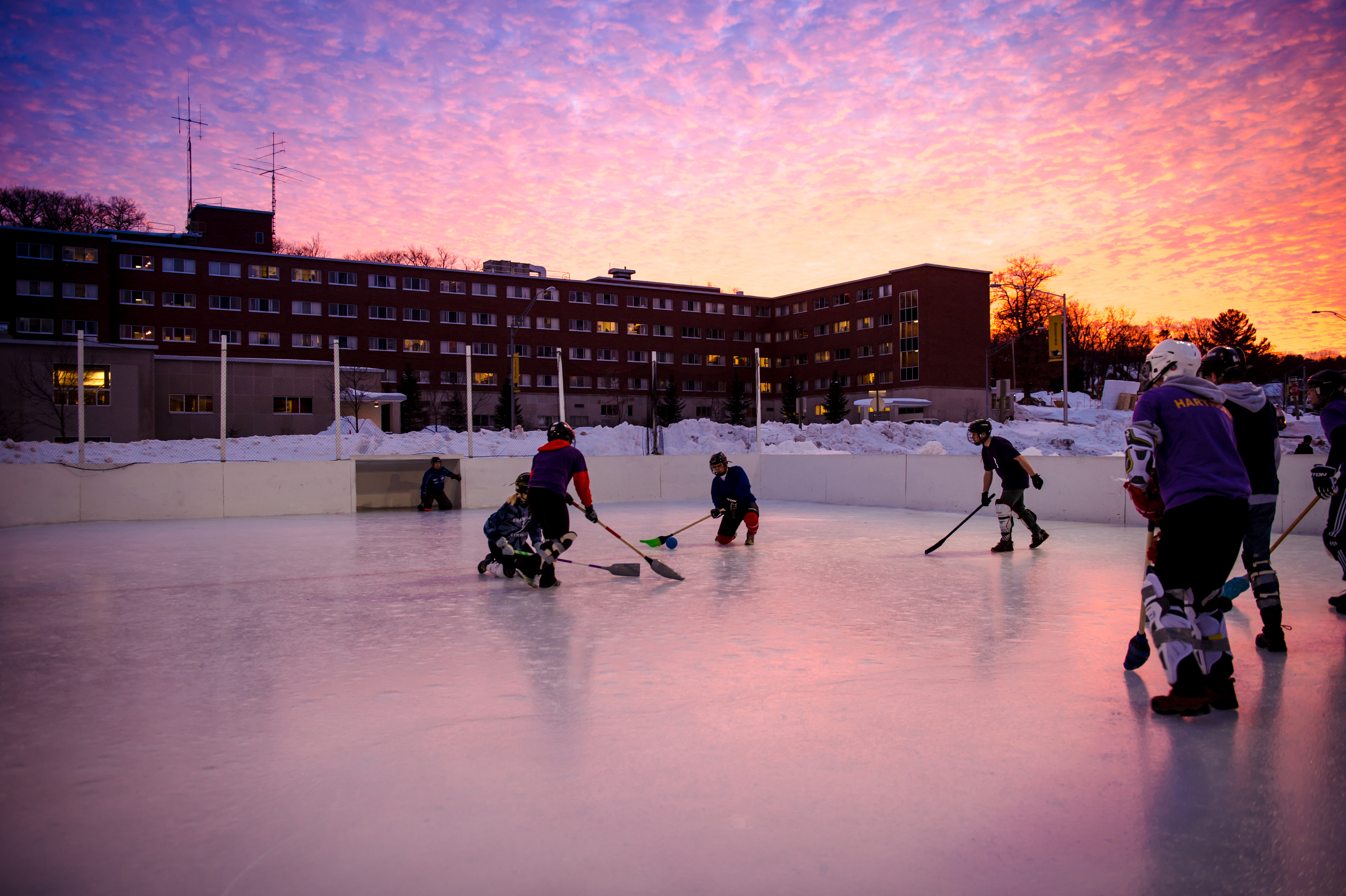
Broomball played on outdoor ice with traditional brooms

The sport is played on either an indoor or outdoor ice rink. Conventional play involves the use equipment designed specifically for broomball, though recreationally the traditional corn broom with tape is still used. A regulation broomball goal net is considerably larger than the one used in the sport of ice hockey, though conventional ice hockey nets are often used unofficially.

A broomball game begins with a face-off. A typical game of broomball is broken up into two or three periods. Each team has a goaltender plus five other players, typically two defenders and three attackers (two forwards and one centre). If the ice surface is especially small, some leagues use fewer players on the ice.

The object of the game is to score goals into the opponent's goal or net. The team with the most goals at the end of a game is declared the winner. In some tournaments, if the scores are tied after regular time, an additional overtime period is played to determine a winner. In the overtime period (in most cases), six players, three on each team, play five minutes without a goalie. The team to score more goals in the overtime period is declared the winner. In the event of another tie, a second overtime period may be played. In some games a shootout period will be played. The shooter has the choice to have the ball placed a specified distance from the net or, like in hockey, can play the ball from centre ice.

== Equipment ==
Sport specific equipment involves broomball shoes, broomball sticks, and broomball balls. Equipment used is either traditional for an informal style of play, or a deliberately manufactured design created for modern, formal play.

=== Protective equipment ===
In competitive play, protective equipment for broomball is similar to that used in the sports of ice hockey and ringette with some sport specific equipment designed for broomball.

=== Broomball stick ===
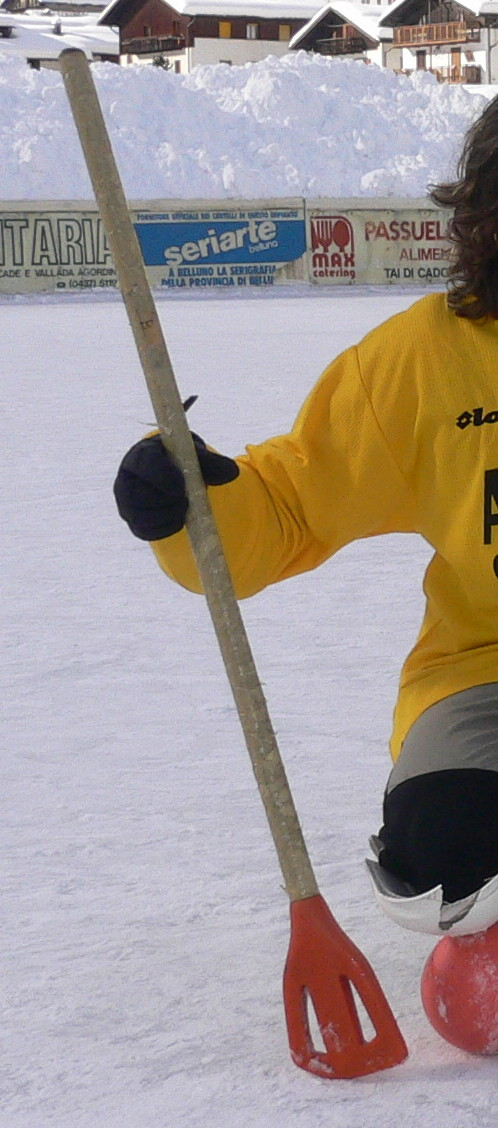
Broomball stick (modern)

In traditional play, a broom is literally a broom, usually a corn broom, with tape added to keep the bristles from fraying. In the modern game, a broomball stick has a shaft with a stylized hard plastic paddle at the end.

=== Broomball shoes ===
Shoes designed specifically for broomball are available for purchase, but only for games played on ice. The soles are designed to give players traction on the ice.

=== Broomball balls ===
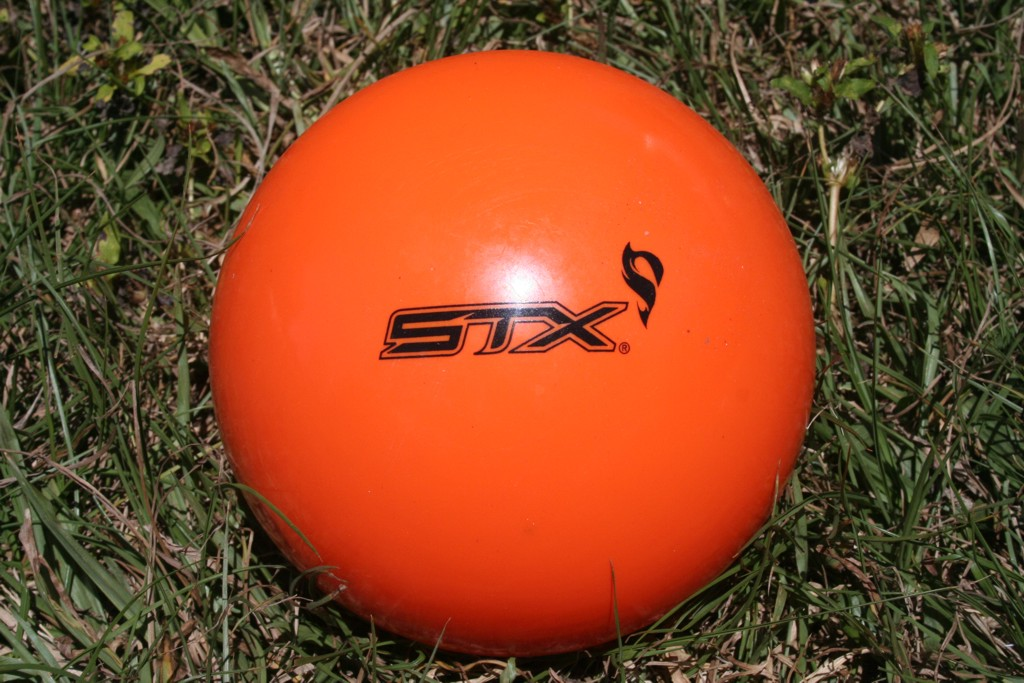
Indoor broomball balls are orange.

In informal play, players can use any type of ball, though a soccer ball is usually used. In more formal play, two types of balls are manufactured for use. An outdoor ball is usually the colour blue, while the indoor ball is the colour orange.

=== Broomball goal nets ===
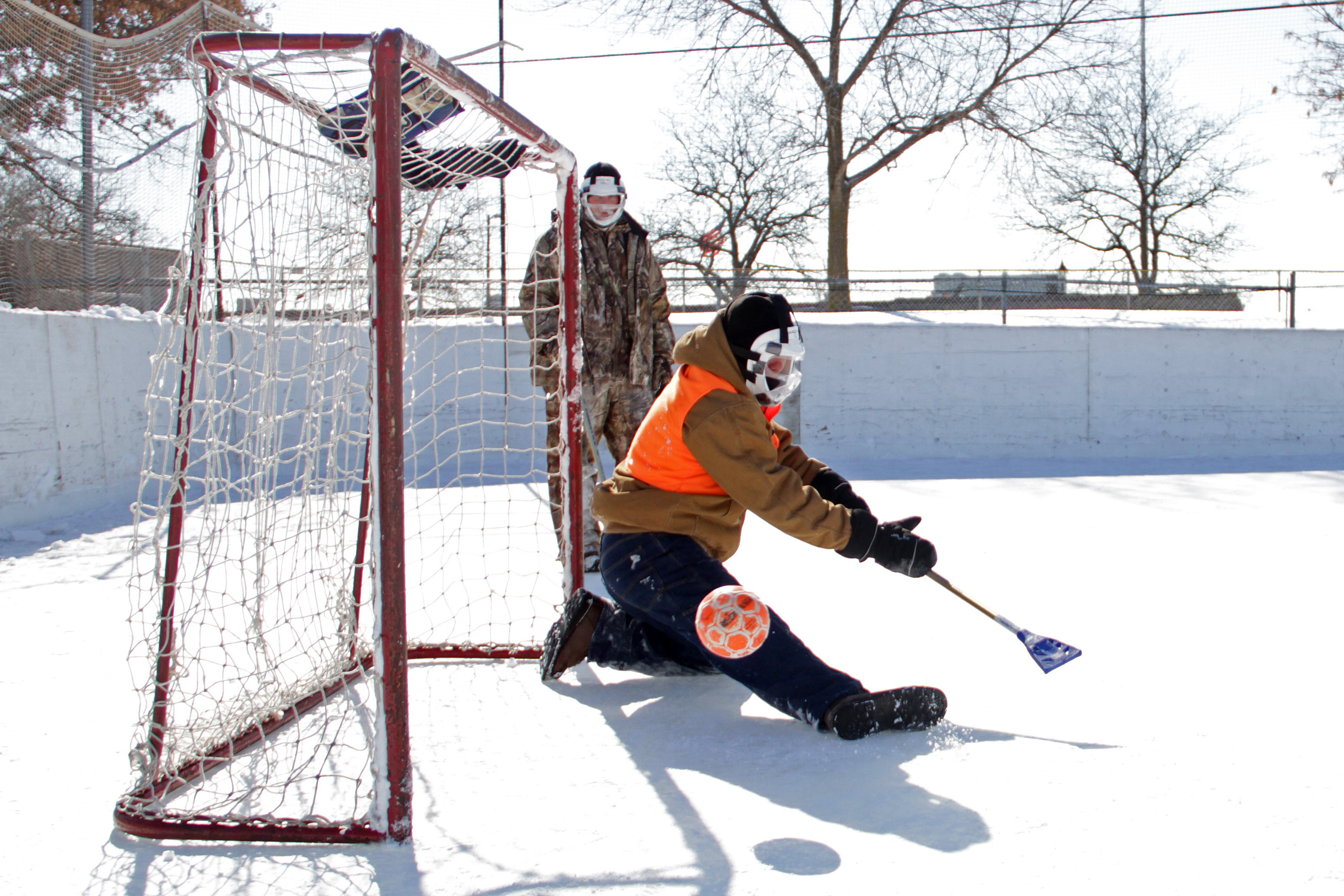
A broomball goal net is larger than those used in ice hockey and ringette

Broomball goal nets have a different shape than those used in ice hockey and ringette and are larger.

=== Goaltender equipment ===
Goaltenders generally wear a full face cage in addition to thick padding on the legs, thighs, chest and shoulders. Goaltenders are permitted to use a blocker, a specially designed rectangular glove attachment that is used to block shots. A blocker is similar to those used by ice hockey and ringette goalies. Goalies must also wear a chest protector.

== Officials ==
Broomball games are controlled by two on-ice referees. Both referees have the same powers to call all penalties, off-sides, goals, and so on. There usually are off-ice officials as well, depending on the level of the game being played, including a scorekeeper, a timekeeper, a penalty timekeeper, and goal judges.

Referees are generally required to wear black and white vertical-striped jerseys, with a red arm band on one arm. They use this arm to signal penalties throughout the game.

== History ==
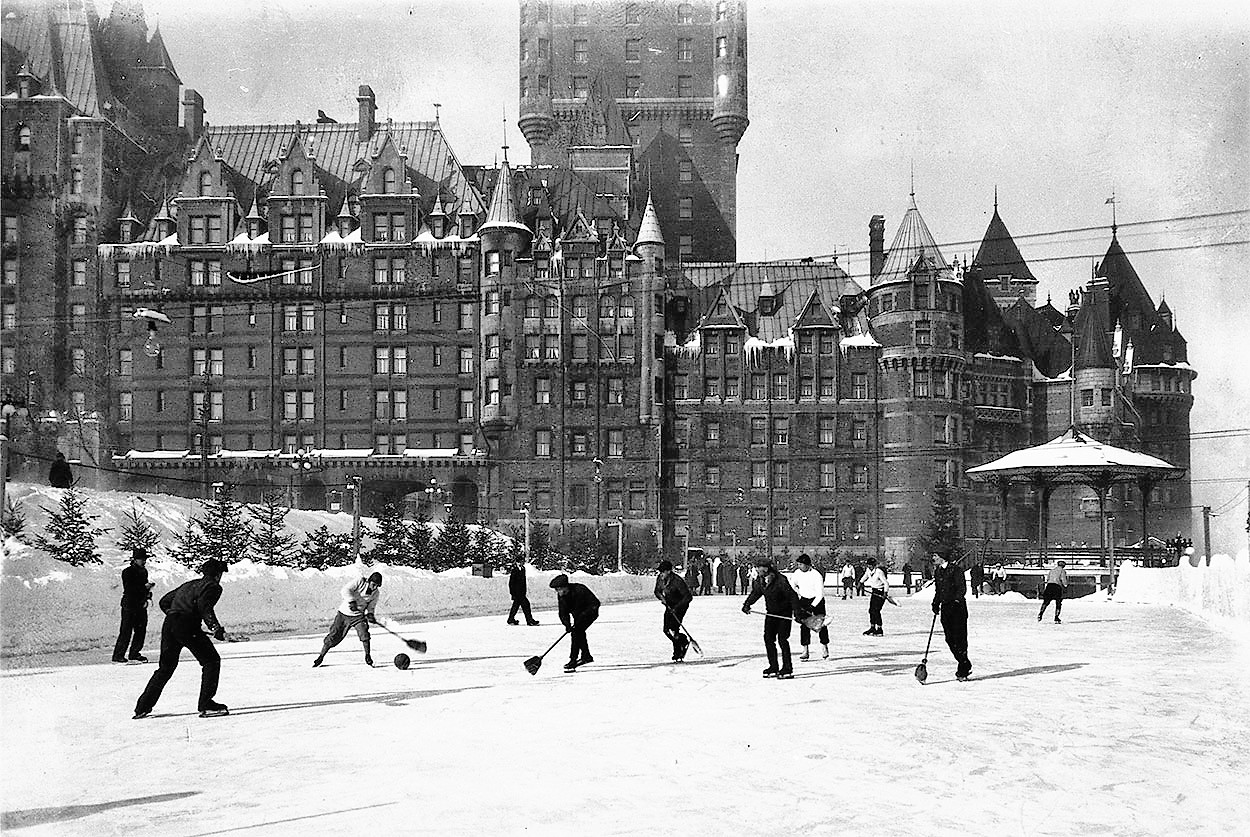
Broomball players playing on ice skates on the Terrasse Dufferin in Quebec City circa 1923

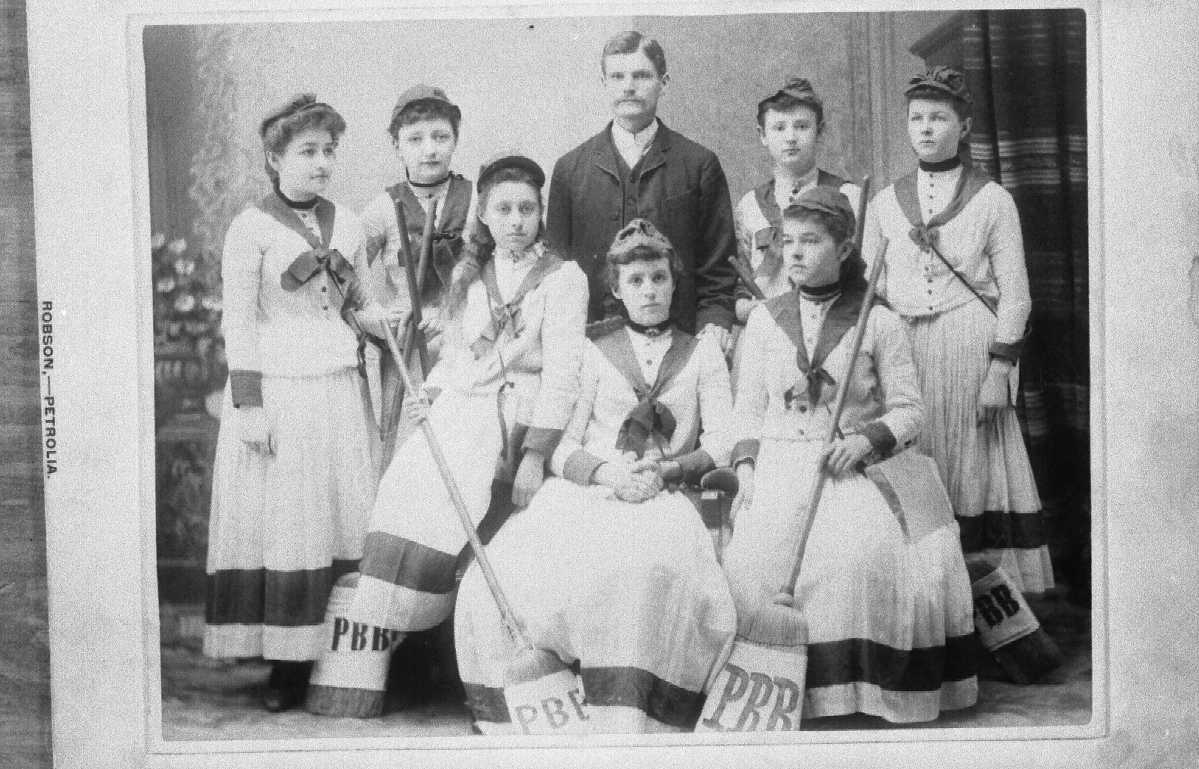
Antique broomball - Petrolia Girls Team - Ontario, Canada - early 1900s

There is no known fully accurate history of broomball. The exact origin of the sport has been difficult to pinpoint. The best estimates in regards to its origin involves the First Nations in Canada, who are believed to have passed the sport on to the settlers.

The first known recorded broomball games in North America were a variant played on roller skates in New York City and Kentucky. The first documented play in Canada is at Perdue, Saskatchewan, on March 5, 1909, though the game has also been observed to have been played by organized girls teams in the province of Ontario in the early 1900s.

The Canadian style of the game is believed to have spread south to the United States, becoming especially popular in Minnesota. In 1910 a group of men would gather and play on the ice by the docks in Duluth, Minnesota. By the 1960s a broomball community was thriving in Minnesota.

Initially the sport used brooms, usually corn brooms, and an assortment of different types of balls which were bigger than a baseball but not larger than a soccer ball. The playing area for a game of broomball took place on either a snow-covered area or field, or on an area of ice created by frozen ponds, lakes, rivers and the like, until both enclosed indoor and outdoor ice rinks, usually ice hockey rinks using artificial ice became more prevalent. Today the game is played on snow mostly during organized winter festivals, but play using an ice surface, especially artificial ones, has grown in popularity and is the playing area more prevalently seen used today. In regards to equipment, sport specific sticks and balls are available and have been developed for the game with balls designed for both indoor and outdoor play, while protective equipment is similar to and sometimes identical to that found in the sport of ice hockey.

Broomball gradually spread internationally over the following decades, and by the 1980s, organized broomball was being played in Australia, Japan, Sweden, Italy, Germany, and Switzerland.

== International governing body ==
International Federation of Broomball Associations (IFBA) logo

The International Federation of Broomball Associations (IFBA) is the world governing body of broomball. Its headquarters are in Canada.

Every two years the IFBA runs the IFBA World Broomball Championships (also known as the Challenge Cup), an international event with teams from around the world. Historically, the championships have been dominated by the North Americans teams.

== International status ==
Broomball has been gaining popularity internationally. The sport is now an established international recreational sport, played in many countries around the world. Canada and the United States are the "powerhouse" nations of the sport, with their local representative teams often battling in prestigious tournaments held annually across North America.

In Japan, some top teams and players are attracted to regular tournaments. Australia holds its annual National Championships in centres across the country and is continually increasing its number of players in a country where ice sports are not considered popular. Switzerland and Italy regularly send representative teams to tournaments in North America. Other broomball nations include Finland, Germany, and Russia.

=== IFBA Rules vs USA Rules ===
There are two main differences between International Federation of Broomball Associations (IFBA) gameplay and American broomball gameplay: the way offside works, and the size of the net. The results of these rules are generally considered to effect the game by making both the score and the pace of play slightly slower under IFBA rules.

==== Offside ====
Under IFBA rules, the red line (centre ice) is the only line used to determine offside. Once the offensive team clears the red line, the defense must work to get it back over the same line.

In American broomball, a "floating blue line" is employed, meaning the offensive team must pass the blue line, and then the defense must work to get it back over the red line.

==== Goalnets ====
The other major difference is the size of the goalnets.

- IFBA sanctioned games use a 5-by-7-foot (1.5 m × 2.1 m) net.
- American broomball uses 6-by-8-foot (1.8 m × 2.4 m) nets.

While there are other slight differences, these two are by far the most significant.

== University and college broomball ==
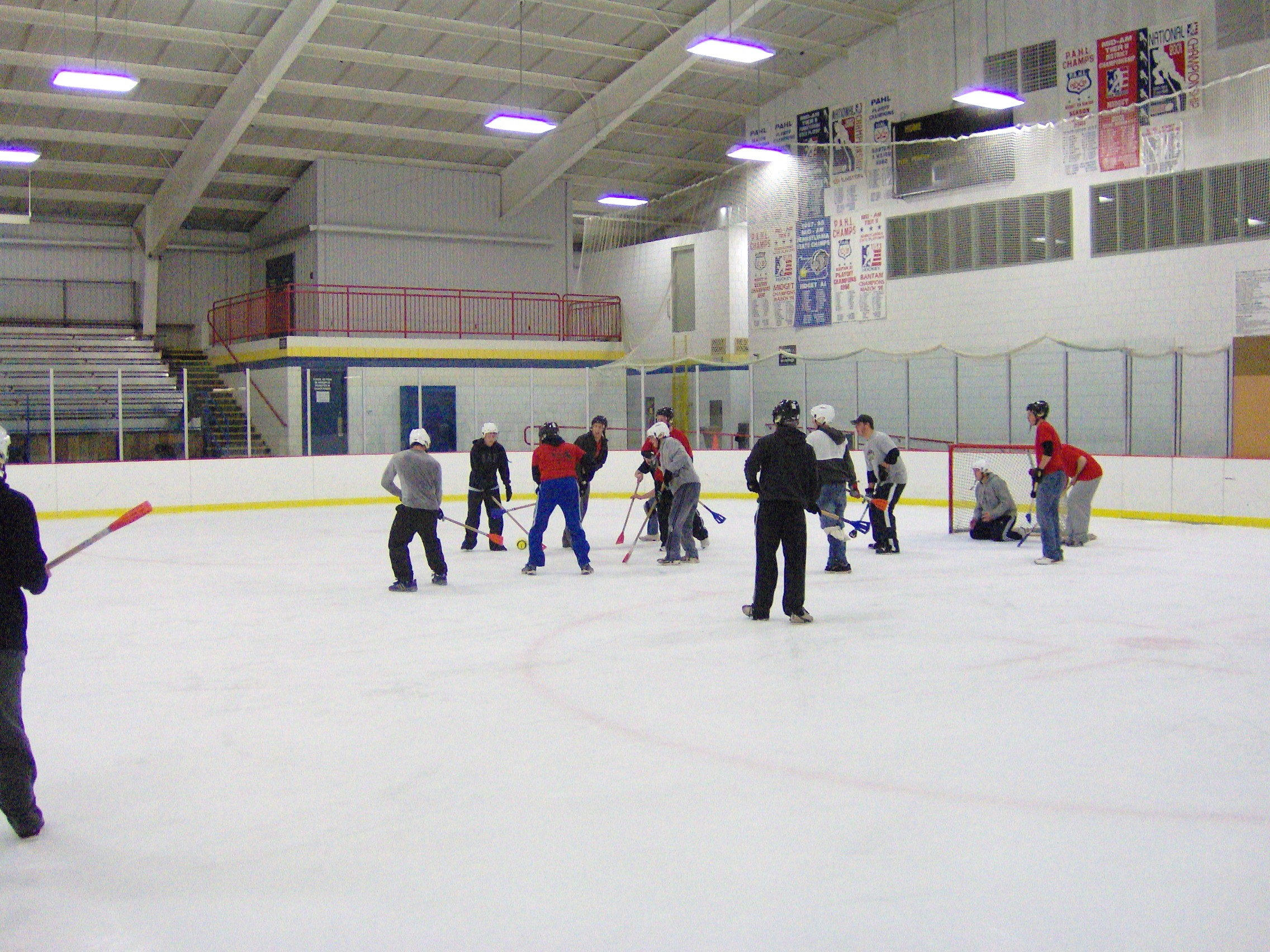
College students from Geneva College playing broomball as a social event.

Broomball is played at many universities and colleges, mostly in North America. Some leagues are competitive while others function as a social event.

=== United States ===
In the United States, broomball is played at the following educational institutions:

- Bethel University (Minnesota)
- Boston University
- Carleton College
- University of Chicago
- Iowa State University
- Massachusetts Institute of Technology
- Miami University
- Michigan State University
- Michigan Technological University
- University of Nebraska–Lincoln
- University of Notre Dame
- Princeton University (intramural sport)
- Rochester Institute of Technology
- St Olaf College
- University of Texas at Austin
- Yale University

== Moscow broomball ==
Broomball is played, with a slightly different ruleset, by expatriates in Moscow.
