= Crystal Beach =

Crystal Beach may refer to one of the following locations:

== Canada ==
- Crystal Beach, Ontario, a community in Fort Erie, Ontario
  - Crystal Beach Park, an amusement park located in Crystal Beach, Ontario, from 1888 to 1989
    - Crystal Beach Cyclone, a former roller coaster located here
    - Crystal Beach Hill, a geologically old and natural sand dune located here
- Crystal Beach, Ottawa, a community located in Ottawa, Ontario

== United States ==
- Crystal Beach, Arizona, an unincorporated community in Mohave County, Arizona
- Crystal Beach, Florida, an unincorporated community and a beach located in Pinellas County, Florida
- Crystal Beach, Maryland, an unincorporated beach community in Cecil County, Maryland
- Crystal Beach, Michigan, several locations
- Crystal Beach, New York, a hamlet in Ontario County, New York
- Crystal Beach, Texas, an unincorporated community in Galveston County, Texas

== See also ==
- Crystal Ocean, a British Thoroughbred racehorse
