= Clendening =

Clendening is a surname. Notable people with the surname include:

- Adam Clendening (born 1992), American ice hockey player
- Derek Clendening (born 1981), Canadian writer
- Logan Clendening (1884–1945), American physician and medical writer
- Robert J. Clendening (1914–1982), American politician

Alternative spelling Clendinnen
