= Point Abino Light Tower =

Lighthouse on Lake Erie, Ontario, Canada

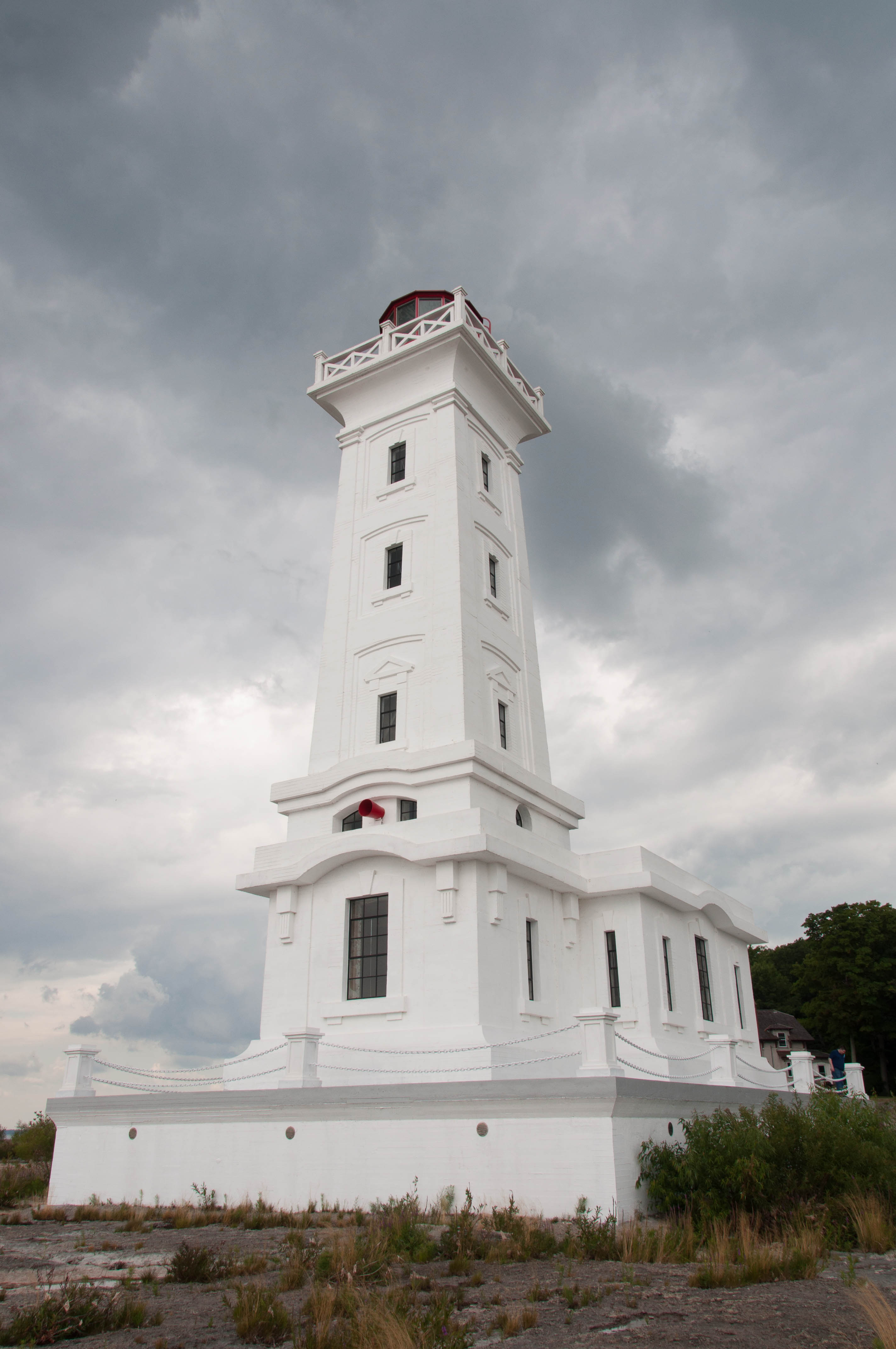
- Location: Fort Erie, Ontario, Canada
- Coordinates: 42°50′9.96″N 79°05′42.72″W

Tower
- Constructed: 1917
- Construction: Poured concrete
- Automated: 1988
- Height: 30 metres (98 ft)
- Markings: White with red accents
- Heritage: National Historic Site of Canada

Light
- First lit: 1918
- Deactivated: 1995
- Focal height: 27 metres (89 ft)
- Lens: Third-order Fresnel lens
- Range: 15 nautical miles (28 km; 17 mi)
- Characteristic: Fl (3) W 12s.

National Historic Site of Canada
- Official name: Point Abino Light Tower National Historic Site of Canada
- Designated: 15 July 1998

The Point Abino Light Tower is a lighthouse on the rocky north shore of Lake Erie at the southern tip of Point Abino peninsula west of Crystal Beach, Ontario, Canada. The Greek Revival white square tower with red accents is attached to the fog alarm building, and a lighthouse keeper's residence is located on the shore to the north.

The site was considered for a lighthouse as early as 1855 by a United States lighthouse inspector, but its shoal was only marked by buoys until 1912, when the whaleback vessel Buffalo Lightship was installed nearby. The lightship sank as a result of the Great Lakes Storm of 1913. (Note: "A refurbished LV 82 later served as a relief lightship from 1916 to 1925, and then on Eleven Foot Shoal in Lake Huron from 1926 to 1936. LV 96 was stationed off Point Abino in 1914, followed by her sister ship LV 98, which carried on the responsibility from 1915 to 1918.") Four years later the Canadian government commissioned the construction of the tower, citing increased traffic at the eastern end of Lake Erie. Due to the completion of the Welland Canal and the increase in shipping, it was decided to build a lighthouse and foghorn on the site. (Note: "The Canadian Government determined that a replacement was necessary because of the dangerous shoals and because of the larger ships and greatly increased traffic using the newly-opened fourth Welland ship canal.")

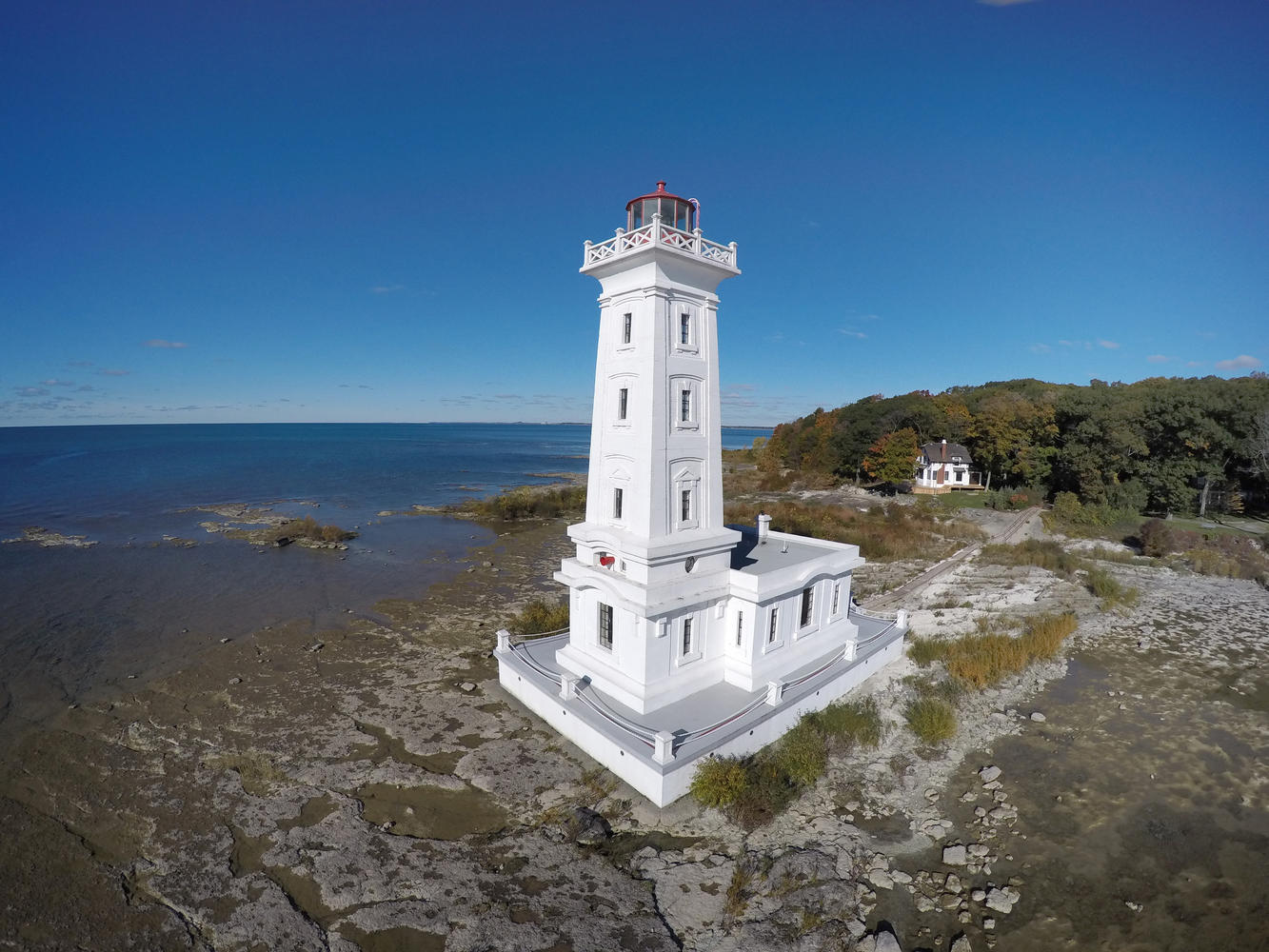
Point Abino Lighthouse

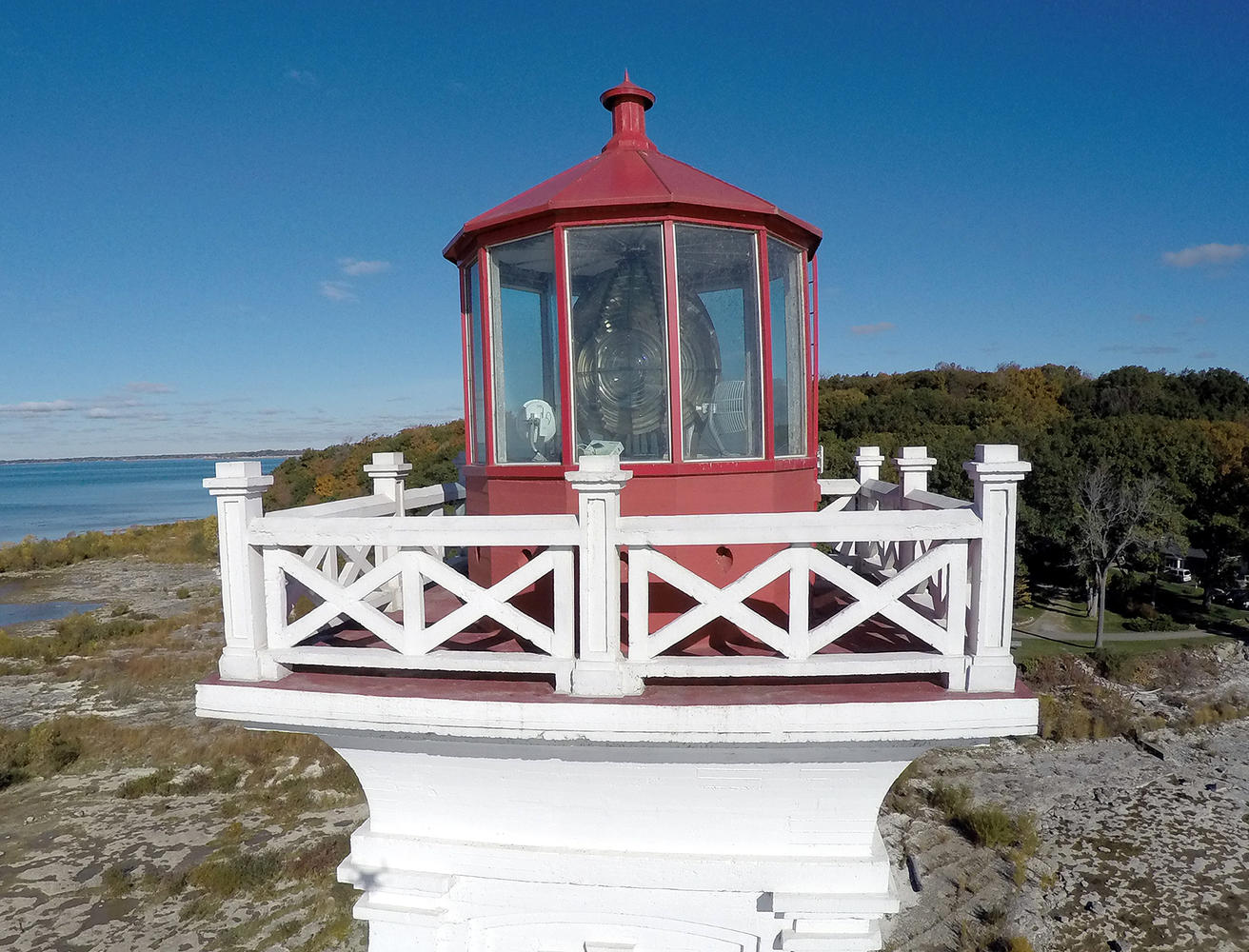
Point Abino Lighthouse Lens

Approaches and visits are severely restricted, as the site is landlocked — i.e., intervening land for access is private property.

== Background ==
Point Abino had been identified as early as 1855 as a desirable location for a lighthouse. In a letter dated 29 September 1855, United States lighthouse inspector engineer J.C. Woodruff stated that a lighthouse at Point Abino equipped with a foghorn would have great utility, and would "save annually many lives and a large amount of property", particularly because most commercial shipping in Lake Erie was along the northern shore in Canada. It was one of three Canadian sites identified by Woodruff, the others being Long Point, where the Government of Canada already operated a lighthouse, and Point Pelee, where it had begun construction of a lighthouse at the time of the report. In fact, this location was particularly important to shipping that was bound to or coming from the port of Buffalo, New York, which was a tricky piece of navigation frequently hampered by adverse waves, wind, fog and weather. This was a source of concern which crossed international boundaries. The December 1898 edition of The Buffalo Courier requested a lighthouse at the point. The article quoted a captain's public address, who said there was a critical need, atop his wish list that:

... it's a lighthouse and fog horn on Point Abino. With the present lights and signals, few masters would care to attempt to run into Buffalo on a bad night, especially if there was a heavy fog or a driving snow storm. The trouble is Point Abino. Once I have that, I can make Buffalo easy. Without a light there, I had rather put my vessel before the wind and stick the night out above, than attempt to enter the harbor when, as I say, a snowstorm is raging. (Note: "Point Abino, however, is on Canadian territory, and as there are few Canadian boats interested in the matter of a lighthouse there, it would be almost a miracle were one ever erected. And yet it might be accomplished, with the present conciliatory spirit existing between the two countries.")

Point Abino is approximately 10 miles (16 km) across the lake from the Buffalo harbor.

In 1907, a request for a lightship was made, but no appropriation was authorized by Congress.

Before 1912, the shoal surrounding the point had been marked by buoys. The Buffalo Lightship, a lightship built in 1912, was installed at the site, but the violent Great Lakes Storm of 1913 sank the vessel and killed all its crew in November 1913.

In its early history, the peninsula had been inhabited by Claude Aveneau, a Jesuit missionary who built a log cabin atop one of the dunes. By the late 19th century, it was the site of a quarry, lime kiln, sawmill, shortline railroad, and a few boarding houses. At this time, it had become known as "Point Abino", a corruption of the missionary's name. In 1892, Buffalo real estate developer Isaac Holloway purchased the point, subdivided it into fifty lots, and sold them to Buffalo businessmen. The peninsula had become an enclave for wealthy industrialists, particularly those from New York and Ohio, attracted to its forests to build summer houses.

The federal Department of Marine and Fisheries commissioned William P. Anderson to design a lighthouse, which it built starting in 1917. The Point Abino Light Tower was a "response to increased traffic at the east end of Lake Erie". In the 15 September 1917 edition of the Canada Gazette, a notice was included that the lighthouse was under construction and would open when completed in early October.

The wealthy summer house owners had formed the Point Abino Association, which negotiated with the Department of Marine and Fisheries to sign an agreement restricting access to the lighthouse from the water. As a result, the lighthouse was built on a rocky shelf at the end of the point, and the lighthouse keepers could only access the lighthouse by "wading through the shallows". Even during construction, access to the private roads on the peninsula was restricted, requiring construction material to be brought to the site via the western shore.

== Structure ==
The white square tower was built in the Greek Revival style from poured concrete The five-storey tower structure is tapered with red accents, surmounting one end of a single-storey, flat-roofed rectangular fog alarm building integrated into the design. The structure's deck connects to a concrete walkway leading to an onshore residence for the lighthouse keeper, which was built in 1921.

The 1917 specifications announced in the Canada Gazette were for the reinforced concrete lighthouse to be located 225 feet (69 m) "south from the wooded shore", sitting atop a reinforced concrete foundation 8 feet (2.4 m) high, reaching a peak of 87 feet (27 m) above the lake, with a luminous intensity of 60,000 cd making it visible from 15 miles (24 km) on "all points of approach by water". The iron lantern was painted red.

The dodecagonal lantern room atop the building still retains its Fresnel lens, a third-order lens that was illuminated with liquefied petroleum gas in an incandescent mantle. Its light characteristic is "Fl(3) W 12s 27m 15M", indicating that the white light would flash three times. A two-second eclipse occurred between the first two flashes, and an eight-second eclipse followed the third one.

The fog alarm was a diaphone which horn was mounted on the south side of the lighthouse building, 33 feet (10 m) above water level, and pointed 165°30' (a bearing of S 8° E). The horn was operated by compressed air, and every minute would issue three 2-second blasts separated by 3-second intervals of silence, quiesce for 48 seconds after the third blast, then repeated the pattern.

The property has a gate, and is located at the south end of Abino Road. The elaborate styling was chosen to complement the summer houses that had been built on the peninsula, and was unique among Ontario lighthouses. The lighthouse keeper's residence was built in the style of an Arts and Crafts cottage on the bluffs along the shore.

The lighthouse keeper's residence was made of wood and rough cast, located on the wooded shore approximately 300 feet (91 m) from the lighthouse. The rectangular building was painted grey, and had a red roof.

For 72 years it was a manned operation. There were four lighthouse keepers, namely: Patrick Augustine (1918 – 1953), Wesley Earl Thomas (1953 – 1960), Milton Shaw (1960), Lewis W. Anderson (1960 – 1989). (Note: One source claims that only two lighthouse keepers covered that span: Patrick Augustine (1918 -1953) and Lewis Anderson (1960 -1990). Despite the fact that this is published by the Abino Light Association, the temporal gaps render it implausible.)

In 1988, it became the last lighthouse in Ontario to be automated. It was decommissioned in 1995.

== National Historic Site ==
The property and building were purchased by the town of Fort Erie from Public Works Canada on 30 April 2003. It consists of a deck, the tower, and fog alarm building. It was officially recognized as a National Historic Site of Canada on 15 July 1998, and was listed on the Canadian Register of Historic Places on 22 April 2009. (Note: "Since being decommissioned in 1995, the Point Abino Lighthouse has been designated as a 'Classified' Heritage Building by the Federal Heritage Buildings Review Office, as a National Historic Site, and as a Classified Federal Building. The concrete Lighthouse is recognized for its unusual shape, classical detailing, and efficiency of structural design.")

In 2011, a project to restore the building was undertaken. The $1.4 million cost was funded by various sources, including the federal National Historic Sites Cost-Sharing program ($425,000) and the sale of the lighthouse keeper's residence, with the remainder provided by the town of Fort Erie. The concrete base was recast and stabilized, the balcony was reconstructed, new windows and doors were installed, the entire building was painted, and the entrance was accentuated with red paint. Aesthetic modifications included the removal of all lead-based coating materials, installation of a corrosion-management system, and application of waterproof coatings. The project also involved the "detailed restoration of the lighthouse's lantern structure", replicating the lantern's original design and materials.

On 8 June 2012, a commemorative plaque was unveiled by Member of Parliament Rob Nicholson, local councillors, and members of the Point Abino Lighthouse Preservation Society.

The lighthouse is accessible by walking or cycling during designated hours, or can be visited via a shuttle operated by the Point Abino Lighthouse Preservation Society, a group of volunteers working to restore the building. The town pays the Point Abino Association $4,000 annually to use the private road to operate the tours. Access to the lighthouse is restricted to two tours a month with a maximum of 25 persons each tour. The tour season is four months, limiting access to a maximum of four hundred persons. Public access and buses have been discontinued.
