= Ontario Southern Railroad =

Ontario Southern Railroad may refer to:

- Ontario Southern Railroad (New York), predecessor of the Pennsylvania Railroad
- Ontario Southern Railway (Ontario), a defunct monorail
