= Ontario Southern Railway (Ontario) =

The Ontario Southern Railway was a short passenger-carrying line which shuttled patrons of Crystal Beach Park in Crystal Beach, Ontario, to and from the main line Grand Trunk Railway station at Ridgeway (both communities now part of Fort Erie, Ontario). The line was approximately 1 1/2 miles (2.4 km) long and operated from 1896 through 1898.

== Design ==
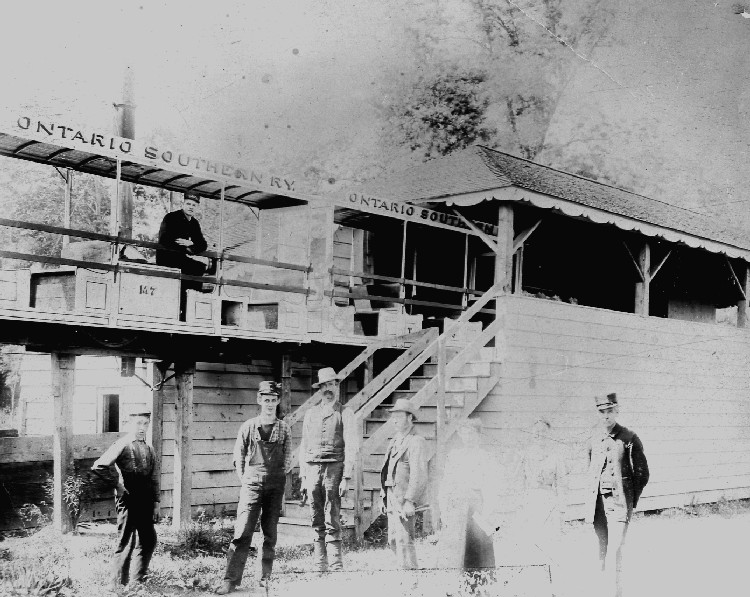
A train and station on the Ontario Southern Railway

The Ontario Southern had a unique design. It was an early example of a monorail, consisting of a single running rail which was laid on top of a wood beam, with guide rails mounted on each side. The majority of the line was elevated 10 to 30 feet (3 to 9 meters) on wooden posts, giving rise to the nickname "the Peg-Leg Railway". The line also passed through one small tunnel under a road.

The passenger carriages were open-sided and had a total of six benches in a back-to-back configuration. These were powered by batteries for the first two years of the line's operation. In the final year, a trolley wire was installed. Power to charge the batteries, and later to energize the trolley wire, came from a generator connected to a stationary steam engine located at the Crystal Beach end of the line.

== Operation ==
The system nominally operated service at 15-minute intervals; however, its reliability was poor. The posts would sway in the soft ground, especially after heavy rains, and winter frosts shifted the posts, necessitating substantial maintenance each spring.

In spite of the maintenance challenges facing the railway, no major accidents are known. The only known fatality was to a cow, struck by the battery case which hung beneath the car. Nevertheless, a lack of passengers made the line uneconomical. It was more a novelty than a viable means of transportation. The primary form of public conveyance to Crystal Beach was via steamship from Buffalo, New York, with the railway providing only a secondary service. Following the 1898 season, the railway was closed and dismantled.

== See also ==
- List of Ontario railways
- List of defunct Canadian railways
