= Clendinnen =

Clendinnen is a surname. Notable people with the surname include:

- Inga Clendinnen (1934–2016), Australian writer, historian, anthropologist, and academic
- F. John Clendinnen (1924–2013), Australian philosopher of science
