= Fort Erie, Ontario =

Town in Ontario, Canada

Fort Erie
- Town (lower-tier)
- Town of Fort Erie
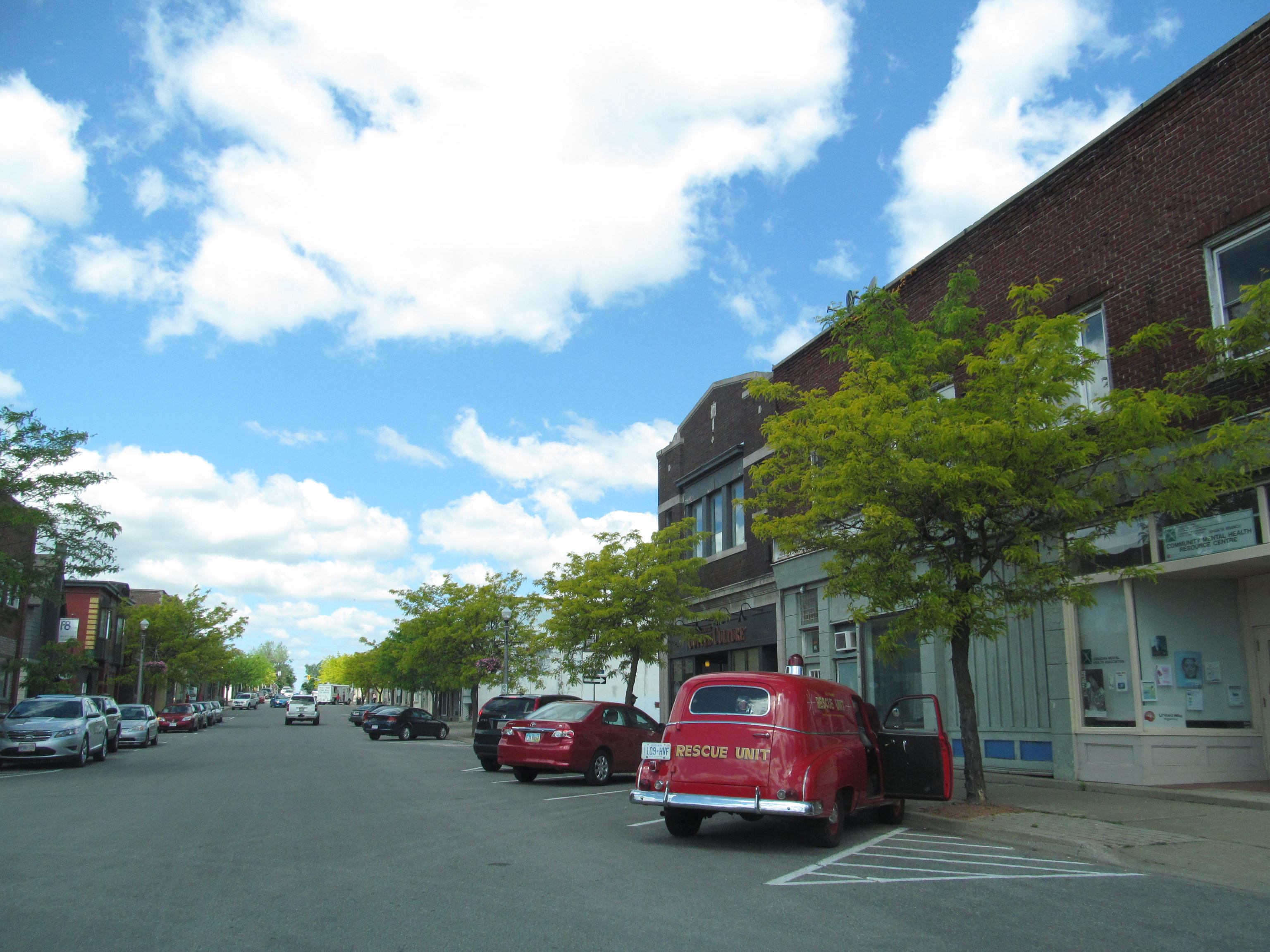
- Fort Erie

- Location within Regional Municipality of Niagara Location within Southern Ontario
- Coordinates: 42°55′N 79°01′W
- Country: Canada
- Province: Ontario
- Regional Municipality: Niagara

Government
  - Mayor: Wayne Redekop
  - Governing body: Fort Erie Town Council
  - MP: Fred Davies
  - MPP: Wayne Gates

Area
  - Land: 166.27 km^{2} (64.20 sq mi)

Population (2016)
  - Total: 30,710
  - Density: 184.7/km^{2} (478/sq mi)
- Time zone: UTC-5 (EST)
  - Summer (DST): UTC-4 (EDT)
- Forward Sortation Area: L2A, L0S 1B0, 1N0, 1R0, 1S0, 1S1
- Area codes: 905, 289, 365, and 742
- Highways: Queen Elizabeth Way; Highway 3
- Website: www.forterie.ca

Fort Erie is a town in the Niagara Region of Ontario, Canada. The town is located at the south eastern corner of the region on the Niagara River, directly across the Canada–United States border from Buffalo, New York. It is the site of Old Fort Erie, which played a prominent role in the War of 1812.

Fort Erie is one of Niagara's fastest growing communities and has experienced a high level of residential and commercial development since the 1990s. It serves as a retirement and tourist destination for larger communities around southern Ontario. Garrison Road (Niagara Regional Road 3) is the town's commercial corridor, stretching east to west through Fort Erie.

Fort Erie is also home to other commercial core areas (Bridgeburg, Ridgeway, Stevensville and Crystal Beach) as a result of the 1970 amalgamation of Bertie Township and the village of Crystal Beach with Fort Erie.

Crystal Beach Park occupied waterfront land at Crystal Beach, Ontario, from 1888 until the park's closure in 1989. The beach is part of Fort Erie.

== History ==
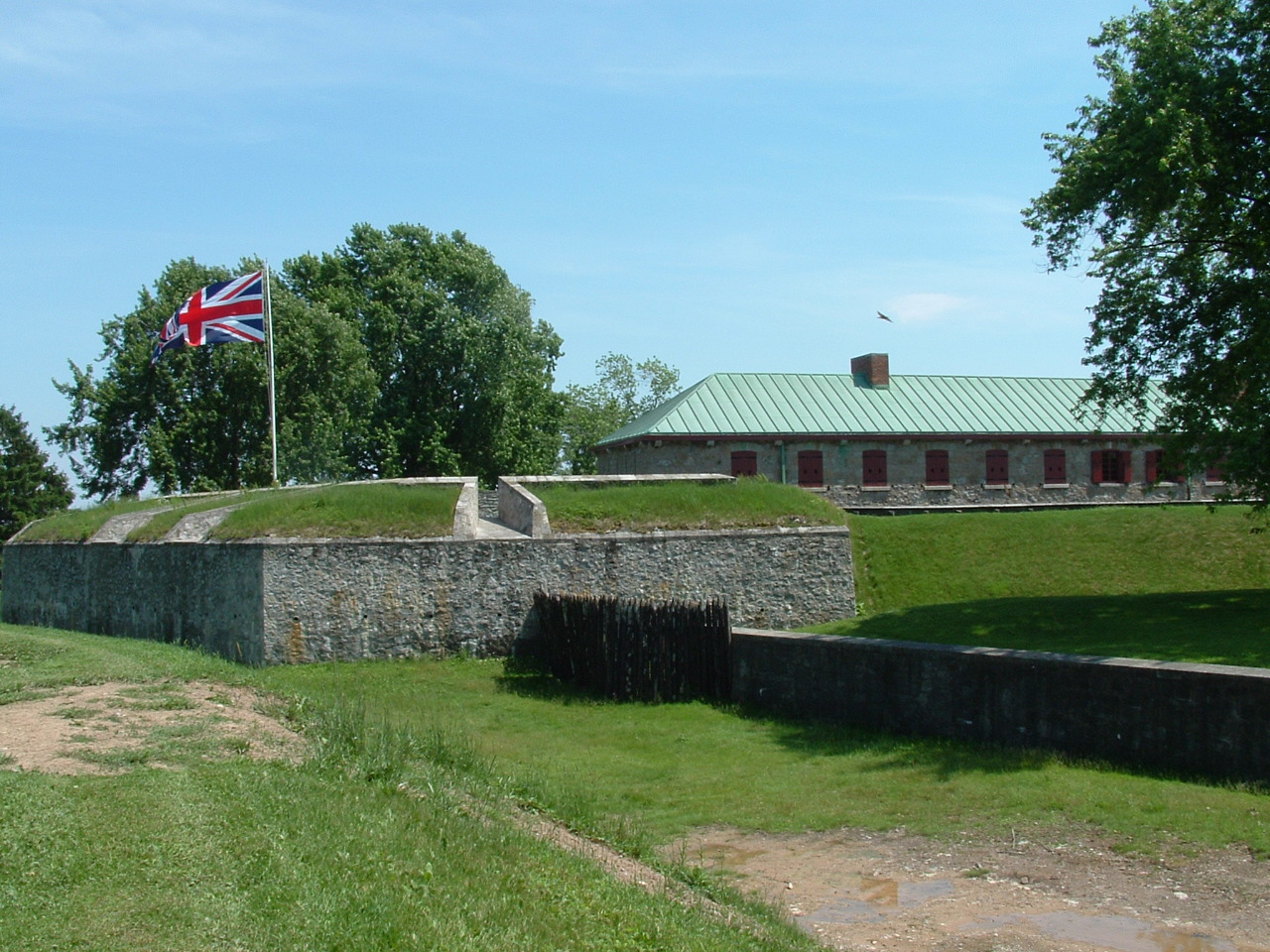
The reconstructed Old Fort Erie

There is archeological evidence that Fort Erie was has been inhabited by indigenous peoples for nearly ten thousand years prior to the settlement of the area by European settlers. A massive archeological site under the foot of the Peace Bridge and surrounding areas under downtown Fort Erie contained millions of artifacts and many gravesites that range from the Archaic period up to the 16th century. The Peace Bridge site was an ancient source of Onondaga limestone which was important source of building materials and flint for tools.

Prior to the 1650s, the Niagara region, which includes Fort Erie, was inhabited by the Attawandaron. There are archaeological remains of a Attawandaron village named "Ouronon" which was discovered on Point Abino, indicating an active presence of Attawandaron peoples in the Fort Erie area prior to the Beaver Wars. Ouronon was razed and its populations dispersed in the mid 1650s by the invading Haudenosaunee during the Beaver wars. While the Haudenosausee claimed it as a hunting ground, there is no archaeological evidence of a permanent Haudenosausee presence in the Fort Erie area. Following the Beaver wars, the Anishinaabe pushed the Haudenosausee back over the river and used the area as a seasonal hunting ground and never established a permanent settlement in the area.

The original fort, built in 1764, was located on the Niagara River's edge below the present fort. It served as a supply depot and a port for ships transporting merchandise, troops and passengers via Lake Erie to the Upper Great Lakes.

During the American Revolution, Fort Erie was used as a supply depot for British troops. To avoid conflict with the local Anishinaabe due to the increased presence of soldiers and refugees from the American revolutionary war, the British signed a treaty with the Anishinaabe Mississaugas called the Niagara Purchase of 178 (Treaty 381) to purchase the western shore of the Niagara River, which included Fort Erie. After the war, the territory of what is now the Town of Fort Erie was settled by soldiers demobilised from Butler's Rangers, and the area was named Bertie Township in 1784.

The fort was damaged by winter storms and in 1803, plans were made for a new fort on the higher ground behind the original. It was larger and made of Onondaga limstone but was not quite finished at the start of the War of 1812.

During the war, the Americans attacked Fort Erie twice in 1812, captured and abandoned it in 1813, and then recaptured it in 1814. The Americans held it for a time, breaking a prolonged British siege. Later they destroyed Fort Erie and returned to Buffalo in the winter of 1814.

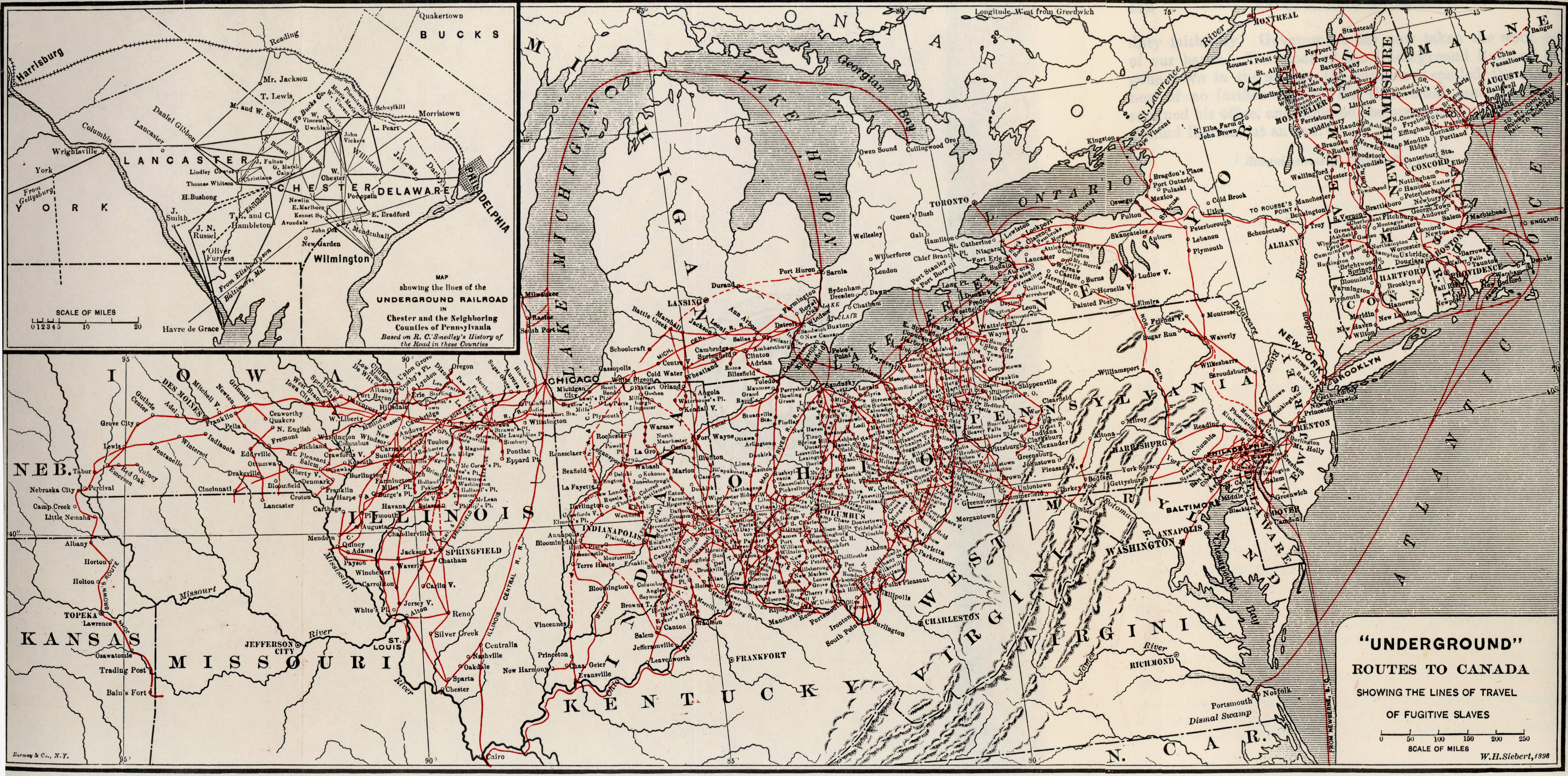
Map of various Underground Railroad routes

While it was believed for many years that Fort Erie, particularly Bertie Hall, was an important stopping point on the Underground Railroad, there is no evidence of this being true. After a thorough investigation by Niagara Parks, no historical records were found that agreed with the local legend. The plaques which commemorated the false history were removed in 2021.

In 1866, during the Fenian raids, between 1,000 and 1,500 Fenians crossed the Niagara River, occupied the town and demanded food and horses. The only payment they were able to offer was Fenian bonds; these were not acceptable to the citizens. The Fenians then cut the telegraph wires and tore up some railway tracks. Afterwards, they marched to Chippewa and the next day to Ridgeway where they fought the Battle of Ridgeway, a series of skirmishes with the Canadian militia. The Fenians then returned to Fort Erie and fought the Battle of Fort Erie, defeating the Canadian militia. Fearing British reinforcements, they then decided to retreat to the U.S.

In 1869 the population was 1,000 and Fort Erie was served by the Grand Trunk and the Erie & Niagara railways. The Grand Trunk Railway built the International Railway Bridge in 1873, bringing about a new town, originally named Victoria and subsequently renamed to Bridgeburg, north of the original settlement of Fort Erie. By 1876, Ridgeway had an estimated population of 800, the village of Fort Erie has an estimated population of 1,200, and Victoria boasted three railway stations. By 1887, Stevensville had an estimated population of "nearly 600", Victoria of "nearly 700", Ridgeway of "about 600", and Fort Erie of "about 4,000".

In 1888, the amusement park at Crystal Beach opened. From 1910, the steamship Canadiana (and until 1929, the steamship SS Americana) brought patrons from Buffalo until 1956. The park continued to operate until it closed in 1989. A gated community was built in this area.

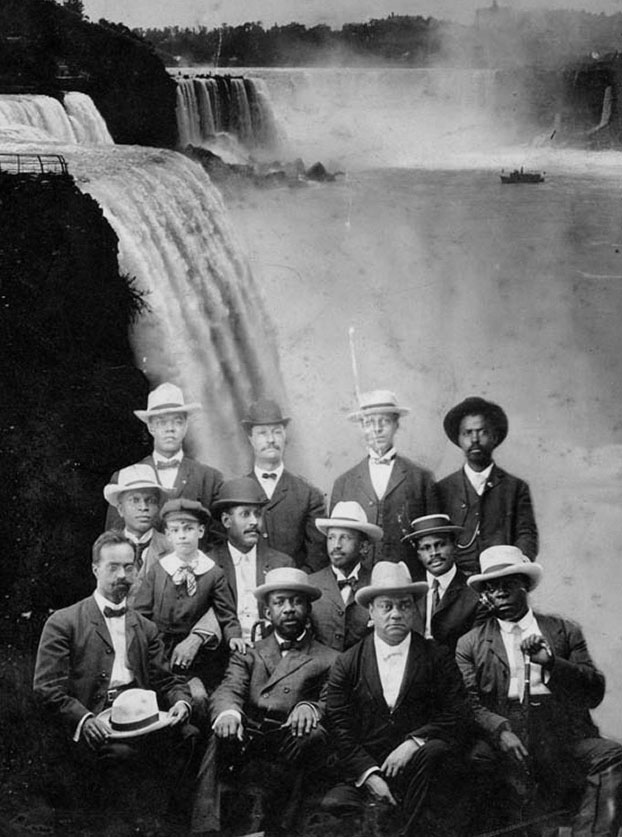
Founders of the Niagara Movement in Fort Erie.

In 1904, a group of speculators bought land at Erie Beach, planning to build an amusement park and other amenities, and sell lots around the park to vacationers from Buffalo. Erie Beach featured a hotel, a casino, a race track, regular ferry service from Buffalo and train service from the ferry dock in Fort Erie, and what was billed as the world's largest outdoor swimming pool. Erie Beach and Crystal Beach were in competition to provide bigger thrills to patrons, until Erie Beach went bankrupt during the Depression and closed down on Labour Day weekend, 1930.

The Niagara Movement meeting was held at the Erie Beach Hotel in 1905. The movement later led to the founding of the NAACP.

The Point Abino Light Tower was built by the Canadian government in 1918. The lighthouse has been automated in 1989. Since its decommissioning in 1995, the Point Abino Lighthouse was designated as a National Historic Site. The lighthouse is now owned by the Town of Fort Erie and is available for weekend tours in the summer.

On August 7, 1927, the Peace Bridge was opened between Fort Erie and Buffalo.

On January 1, 1932, Bridgeburg and Fort Erie amalgamated into a single town.

The ruins of Fort Erie remained until they were rebuilt through a depression era "work program" project, as a tourist attraction. Work started in 1937, and the fort was opened to the public in 1939.

In 1970, the provincial government consolidated the various villages in what had been Bertie Township, including the then town of Fort Erie, into the present Town of Fort Erie.

== Geography ==
Fort Erie is optimally flat, but there are low sand hills, varying in height from 2 to 15 metres (6.6 to 49.2 ft), along the shore of Lake Erie, and a limestone ridge extends from Point Abino to near Miller's Creek, giving Ridgeway its name. The soil is shallow, with a clay subsoil.

The town's beaches on Lake Erie, most notably Erie Beach, Crystal Beach and Bay Beach are considered the best in the area and draw many weekend visitors from the Toronto and Buffalo, New York areas. While summers are enjoyable, winters can occasionally be fierce, with many snowstorms, whiteouts and winds coming off Lake Erie.

=== Communities ===
In addition to the primary urban core of Fort Erie, the town also contains the neighbourhoods of Black Creek, Bridgeburg/NorthEnd/Victoria, Crescent Park, Crystal Beach, Kraft, Point Abino, Ridgeway, Snyder, and Stevensville. Smaller and historical neighbourhoods include Amigari Downs, Bay Beach, Buffalo Heights, Douglastown, Edgewood Park, Erie Beach, Garrison Village, Mulgrave, Oakhill Forest, Ridgemount, Ridgewood, Rose Hill Estates, Thunder Bay, Walden, Wavecrest and Waverly Beach.

Fort Erie Secondary School and Ridgeway-Crystal Beach High School were two public high schools serving Fort Erie and area communities until September 2017. The two former schools were closed and merged into Greater Fort Erie Secondary School, located on Garrison Road.

=== Climate ===
Climate data for Fort Erie (1991−2020 normals, extremes 1966–2020)
Month	Jan	Feb	Mar	Apr	May	Jun	Jul	Aug	Sep	Oct	Nov	Dec	Year
Record high °C (°F)	15.5 (59.9)	19.5 (67.1)	27.0 (80.6)	32.0 (89.6)	32.0 (89.6)	34.0 (93.2)	34.5 (94.1)	35.5 (95.9)	32.5 (90.5)	29.5 (85.1)	25.0 (77.0)	18.0 (64.4)	35.5 (95.9)
Mean daily maximum °C (°F)	0.1 (32.2)	1.2 (34.2)	5.0 (41.0)	11.7 (53.1)	18.9 (66.0)	23.7 (74.7)	26.0 (78.8)	25.9 (78.6)	22.4 (72.3)	15.5 (59.9)	9.1 (48.4)	2.9 (37.2)	13.6 (56.5)
Daily mean °C (°F)	−3.8 (25.2)	−3.3 (26.1)	0.5 (32.9)	6.5 (43.7)	13.2 (55.8)	18.6 (65.5)	21.1 (70.0)	20.8 (69.4)	17.1 (62.8)	10.8 (51.4)	5.3 (41.5)	−0.6 (30.9)	8.8 (47.8)
Mean daily minimum °C (°F)	−7.5 (18.5)	−7.5 (18.5)	−4.1 (24.6)	1.3 (34.3)	7.8 (46.0)	13.4 (56.1)	16.2 (61.2)	15.9 (60.6)	12.2 (54.0)	6.5 (43.7)	1.3 (34.3)	−4.1 (24.6)	4.3 (39.7)
Record low °C (°F)	−28.5 (−19.3)	−31 (−24)	−25.5 (−13.9)	−12 (10)	−4.5 (23.9)	1.0 (33.8)	5.5 (41.9)	1.5 (34.7)	−1 (30)	−6.1 (21.0)	−15.5 (4.1)	−24.5 (−12.1)	−31 (−24)
Average precipitation mm (inches)	91.2 (3.59)	56.6 (2.23)	75.2 (2.96)	81.6 (3.21)	90.7 (3.57)	71.1 (2.80)	89.4 (3.52)	88.7 (3.49)	113.9 (4.48)	96.2 (3.79)	102.7 (4.04)	98.9 (3.89)	1,056.3 (41.59)
Average rainfall mm (inches)	42.3 (1.67)	28.2 (1.11)	42.3 (1.67)	77.3 (3.04)	90.7 (3.57)	71.1 (2.80)	89.4 (3.52)	88.7 (3.49)	113.9 (4.48)	94.2 (3.71)	86.5 (3.41)	45.3 (1.78)	869.8 (34.24)
Average snowfall cm (inches)	48.9 (19.3)	28.4 (11.2)	32.9 (13.0)	4.4 (1.7)	0.0 (0.0)	0.0 (0.0)	0.0 (0.0)	0.0 (0.0)	0.0 (0.0)	2.0 (0.8)	16.2 (6.4)	53.6 (21.1)	186.4 (73.4)
Average precipitation days (≥ 0.2 mm)	18.3	12.4	12.8	13.5	13.8	10.8	11.1	10.1	11.3	12.5	15.2	16.3	157.9
Average rainy days (≥ 0.2 mm)	7.0	5.2	7.9	12.7	13.8	10.8	11.1	10.1	11.3	12.5	12.8	8.4	123.7
Average snowy days (≥ 0.2 cm)	12.3	8.1	6.2	1.5	0.0	0.0	0.0	0.0	0.0	0.12	3.5	8.8	40.5
Source: Environment Canada

== Demographics ==
Historical populations of Fort Erie
Year	Pop.	±%
1871	835	—
1901	890	+6.6%
1911	1,146	+28.8%
1921	1,546	+34.9%
1931	2,383	+54.1%
1941	6,566	+175.5%
1951	7,572	+15.3%
1961	9,027	+19.2%
1971	23,113	+156.0%
1981	24,096	+4.3%
1991	26,006	+7.9%
2001	28,143	+8.2%
2006	29,925	+6.3%
2011	29,960	+0.1%
2016	30,710	+2.5%
2021	32,901	+7.1%

In the 2021 Census of Population conducted by Statistics Canada, Fort Erie had a population of 32,901 living in 14,081 of its 15,875 total private dwellings, a change of 7.1% from its 2016 population of 30,710. With a land area of 166.24 km^{2} (64.19 sq mi), it had a population density of 197.9/km^{2} (512.6/sq mi) in 2021.

The median household income in 2015 for Fort Erie was $60,800, which was below the Ontario provincial average of $74,287.

Canada 2006 Census		Population	% of Total Population
Visible minority group Source:	South Asian	225	0.8%
Visible minority group Source:	Chinese	365	1.2%
Visible minority group Source:	Black	300	1%
Visible minority group Source:	Filipino	50	0.2%
Visible minority group Source:	Latin American	410	1.4%
Visible minority group Source:	Arab	40	0.1%
Visible minority group Source:	Southeast Asian	45	0.2%
Visible minority group Source:	West Asian	30	0.1%
Visible minority group Source:	Korean	85	0.3%
Visible minority group Source:	Japanese	20	0.1%
Visible minority group Source:	Other visible minority	35	0.1%
Visible minority group Source:	Mixed visible minority	20	0.1%
Total visible minority population		1,620	5.5%
Aboriginal group Source:	First Nations	750	2.5%
Aboriginal group Source:	Métis	150	0.5%
Aboriginal group Source:	Inuit	0	0%
Total Aboriginal population		900	3.2%
White		26,985	91.3%
Total population		29,545	100%

== Government ==
The Town Council consists of the Mayor and 6 ward councillors.

Town Council and municipal services are based at Town Hall at 1 Municipal Drive since 1996. The previous location at 200 Jarvis Street was used after the first town hall was vacated in 1985 and was home to Bridgeburg Town Hall. The first town hall is now a parking lot, with the World War 1 memorial moved to Mathers Park, and the second town hall is replaced by the Fort Erie Courthouse.

Fort Erie has a single member on Niagara Regional Council.

== Attractions ==
- Fort Erie Race Track
- Old Fort Erie
- Point Abino Lighthouse
- Niagara Railway Museum
- Safari Niagara

=== Hiking ===
Fort Erie is the eastern terminus of the Friendship Trail, and the southern terminus of the Niagara River Recreation Pathway. Both trails are part of the Trans-Canada Trail system.

=== Parks ===
Mather Arch Park, located just to the south of the Peace Bridge, is on land donated by American citizen Alonzo C. Mather in tribute to the peace and friendship between Canada and the United States. The park contains Mather Arch, which was built largely due to donations by Mather, originally dedicated by the Niagara Parks Commission in 1939, and restored in 2000 as a millennium project. There is also a memorial statue to those from Fort Erie who died in World War I, World War II, and the Korean War.

== Sports ==
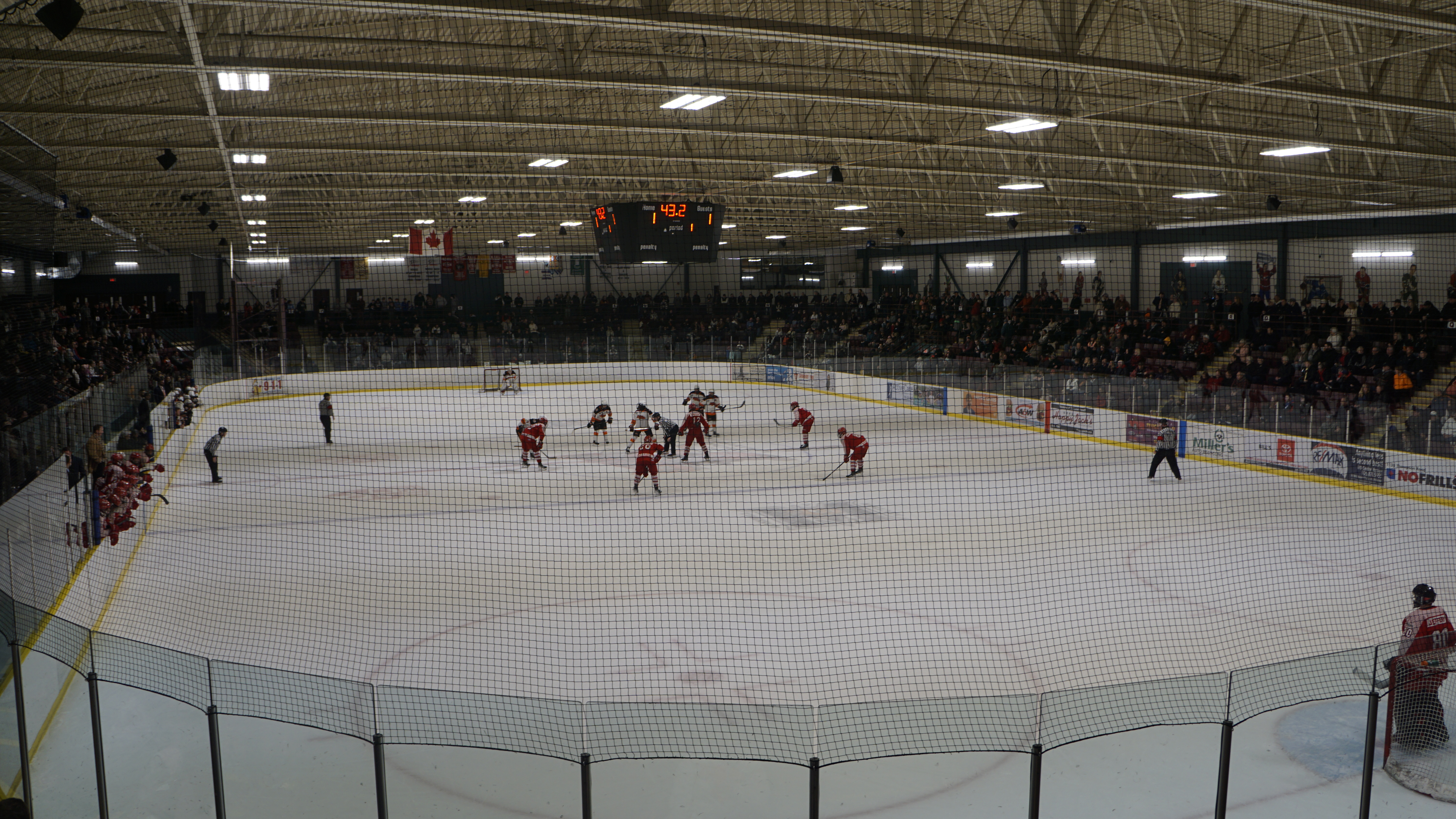
Fort Erie Meteors game

Team	League	Sport	Venue	Established	Championships
Fort Erie Meteors	Greater Ontario Hockey League	Ice hockey	Fort Erie Leisureplex	1957	0 (1 in previous leagues)
Fort Erie Cannons	Niagara District Baseball Association	Baseball	Oakes Park	2005	2

== Infrastructure ==
=== Transportation ===
==== Highways ====
Fort Erie has been the Niagara terminus of the Queen Elizabeth Way since 1937. Road traffic continues to Buffalo, New York across the Peace Bridge, which was built in 1927.

Fort Erie was the eastern terminus of King's Highway 3A from 1927 to 1929, and Ontario Highway 3 from 1929 until 1998, when the portion of Highway 3 within Fort Erie was downloaded to the Regional Municipality of Niagara and redesignated as Niagara Regional Road 3. Within Fort Erie, Highway 3 is named Garrison Road, and is the major east–west connection through the town. Dominion Road was designated as King's Highway 3C from 1934 until 1970, when it was downloaded to the newly formed Regional Municipality of Niagara and redesignated as Niagara Regional Road 1.

Fort Erie is the southern terminus of the Niagara Parkway, which extends from Fort Erie to Fort George.

==== Public transit ====
Public transit was provided by Fort Erie Transit, which operated buses in town and connected to other Niagara municipalities.

Niagara Region Transit operates a service from Niagara Falls into Fort Erie, connecting with the Fort Erie Leisureplex on Garrison Road.

==== Intercity transit ====
Private intercity coach services are primarily operated by Coach Canada/Megabus, with service to St. Catharines and Toronto. The terminus is located at Robo Mart, 21 Princess Street at Waterloo Street.

The International Railway Bridge was built in 1873, and connects Fort Erie to Buffalo, New York across the Niagara River.

There is currently no passenger rail service to Fort Erie. The nearest passenger rail stations are in Buffalo, New York and Niagara Falls, Ontario.

==== Waterways ====
Fort Erie is at the outlet of Lake Erie into the Niagara River. The lake and river serve as a playground for numerous personal yachts, sailboats, power boats and watercraft. There is a marina at the site of a former shipyard at Miller's Creek on the Niagara River, and a boat launch ramp in Crystal Beach.

Prior to the completion of the two bridges, passengers and freight were carried across the river by ferry.

From 1829, when the Welland Canal first opened, to 1833, when the cut was completed to Port Colborne, ship traffic between Lake Erie and Lake Ontario would transit the upper Niagara River.

=== Utilities ===
In order to reduce large-scale ice blockage in the Niagara River, with resultant flooding, ice damage to docks and other waterfront structures, and blockage of the water intakes for the hydro-electric power plants at Niagara Falls, the New York Power Authority and Ontario Power Generation have jointly operated the Lake Erie-Niagara River Ice Boom since 1964. The boom is installed on December 16, or when the water temperature reaches 4 °C (39 °F), whichever happens first. The boom is opened on April 1 unless there is more than 650 square kilometres (250 sq mi) of ice remaining in Eastern Lake Erie. When in place, the boom stretches 2,680 metres (8,790 ft) from the outer breakwall at Buffalo Harbor almost to the Canadian shore near the ruins of the pier at Erie Beach in Fort Erie. Originally, the boom was made of wooden timbers, but these have been replaced by steel pontoons.

== Notable people ==
- Randy Burridge, played over 700 games in the National Hockey League and was an All-Star in 1992
- Derek Clendening, Canadian writer
- Ernest Alexander Cruikshank, Brigadier General and historian
- Billy Dea, professional hockey player
- Michael Fonfara, keyboard player
- Paul Gardner, professional hockey player
- Paul Hellyer, engineer and politician
- Tim Hudak, politician, leader of the PC party in Ontario
- Douglas Kirkland, photographer
- James L. Kraft, entrepreneur and inventor
- Dan "DJ Shub" General, musician
- Shane Lindstrom (professionally known as Murda Beatz), record producer
- Matty Matheson, chef and internet personality
- Pierre Pilote, professional hockey player
- David Anthony Pizzuto, actor
- Brian Reid, historian

== See also ==
- List of townships in Ontario
