= Backety-Back Scenic Railway =

Wooden roller coaster at Crystal Beach Park

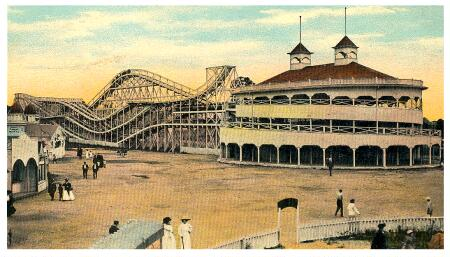

Crystal Beach
- Location: Crystal Beach
- Coordinates: 42.8675000°N 079.0591667°W
- Status: Removed
- Opening date: 1909
- Closing date: 1926
- Cost: $50,000

General statistics
- Type: Wood – Shuttle
- Designer: John H. Brown
- Speed: 10 mph (16 km/h)
- Inversions: 0
- Trains: 2 cars. Riders are arranged 2 across in 5 rows for a total of 20 riders per train.
- Backety-Back Scenic Railway at RCDB

Backety-Back Scenic Railway was a wooden roller coaster located at Crystal Beach Park. The ride opened to the public in 1909 and operated until 1926. The Backety-Back Scenic Railway was notable for a backward-traveling innovation which would be adopted many years later in more modern steel roller coasters. It was also one of the earliest shuttle roller coasters to be built, as well as being the second roller coaster to be built in the Crystal Beach amusement park. The coaster has been cited as a particularly beautiful example of roller coaster architecture.

== History ==
Backety-Back Scenic Railway was built in 1909 by Pennsylvanian John H. Brown and construction of the coaster cost $50,000. Backety-Back Scenic Railway was the only roller coaster Brown would ever build. In 1904, however, he patented the unique track-reversal design which made the coaster a predecessor to modern shuttle roller coasters.

== Track layout and ride experience ==
Being a shuttle roller coaster, Backety-Back Scenic Railway traveled over its course both forwards and backwards. The coaster had two lift hills and also necessitated the operation of a switchman when the coaster had reached the end of its forward progress. Following this reversal, the train would engage a second reversal and continue on its way. The course of the roller coaster was a twister layout and the roller coaster had a curved tunnel in its course as well. Trains had 2 cars of 5 rows apiece, with each row having two riders.

The coaster had a large station which resembled a riverboat in shape. Inside this station was a ticket office (tickets were sold for 10 cents) and the queue for the ride itself.

== Incidents ==
In 1910, a 17-year-old girl, Louise Koch was killed after falling from the Backety-Back Scenic Railway. The coaster had minimal safety features, and the only restraints were the sides of the cars themselves.
