= Muskegon Lake =

Lake in Muskegon County, Michigan, USA

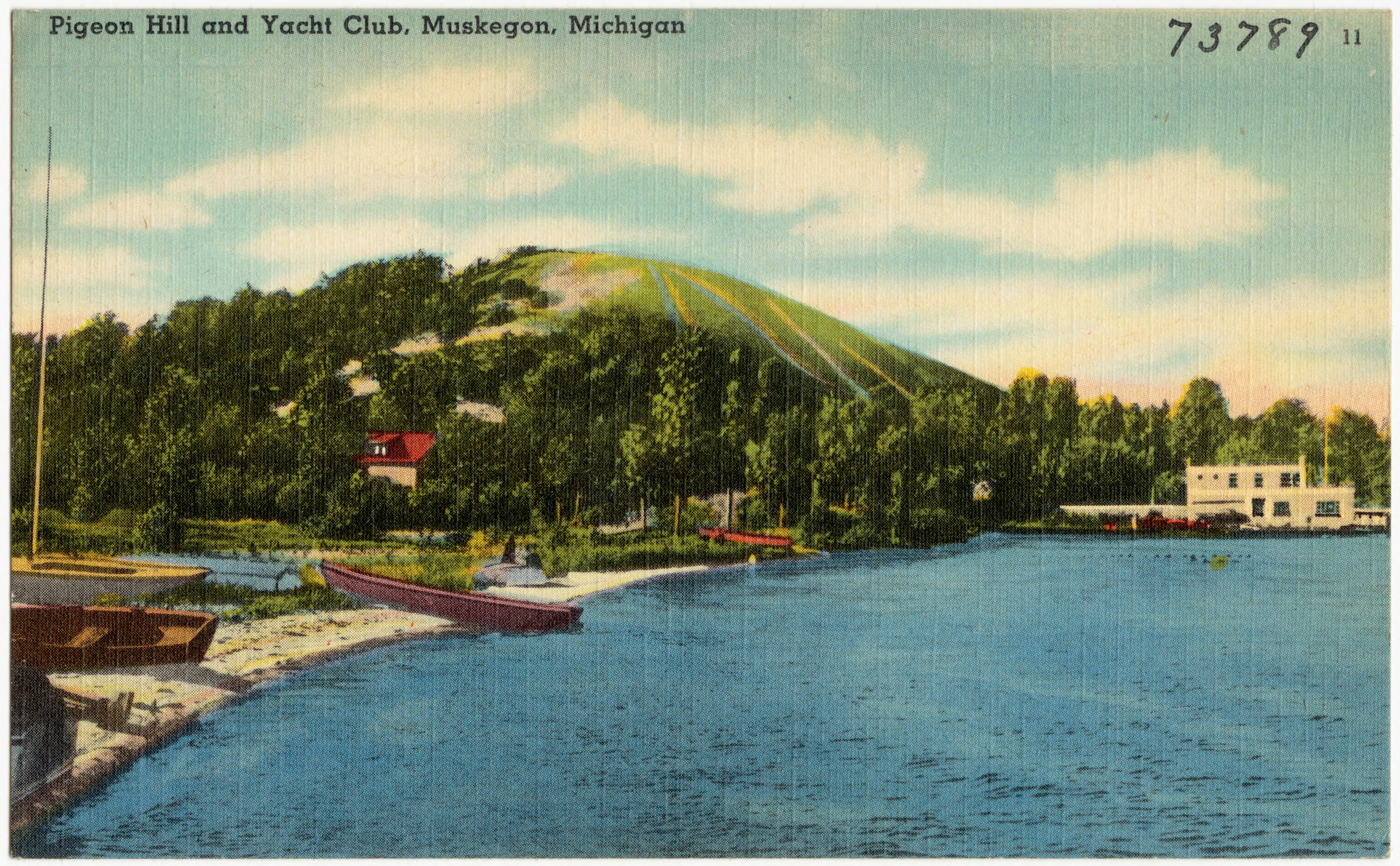

- Location within Michigan Location within the United States
- Location: Muskegon County, Michigan
- Coordinates: 43°13′57″N 86°17′40″W
- Type: Lake
- Primary inflows: Muskegon River
- Basin countries: United States
- Max. length: 5.5 mi (8.9 km)
- Max. width: 2.5 mi (4.0 km)
- Surface area: 4,150 acres (16.8 km^{2})
- Max. depth: 79 ft (24.1 m)
- Surface elevation: 581 ft (177 m)

Muskegon Lake (/məˈskiːɡən/ mə-SKEE-gən) is a 4,150-acre (16.8 km^{2}) fresh-water lake in Muskegon County, Michigan, USA. Located in the lower peninsula at the mouth of the Muskegon River, Muskegon Lake forms a 12-square-mile (31 km^{2}) broad harbor along the eastern shoreline of Lake Michigan, approximately 2.5 miles (4.0 km) wide by 5.5 miles (8.9 km) long.

== Hydrology ==
The Muskegon River, Michigan's second-longest river, originating at Houghton Lake and flowing southwest for 227 miles (365 km), empties into Muskegon Lake at the eastern end before entering Lake Michigan. On the north, Bear Creek/Lake empties into the lake via the Bear Lake Channel and on the south, Ryerson Creek and Ruddiman Creek flow into Muskegon Lake.

== History ==
Muskegon Lake played an important role in the early development of the city of Muskegon, as well as the logging industry in Michigan. Timber, particularly white pine, was harvested throughout central Michigan and floated downstream on the Muskegon River to the lake, which at one time boasted more than 47 sawmills along its banks.

== Cities and parks ==
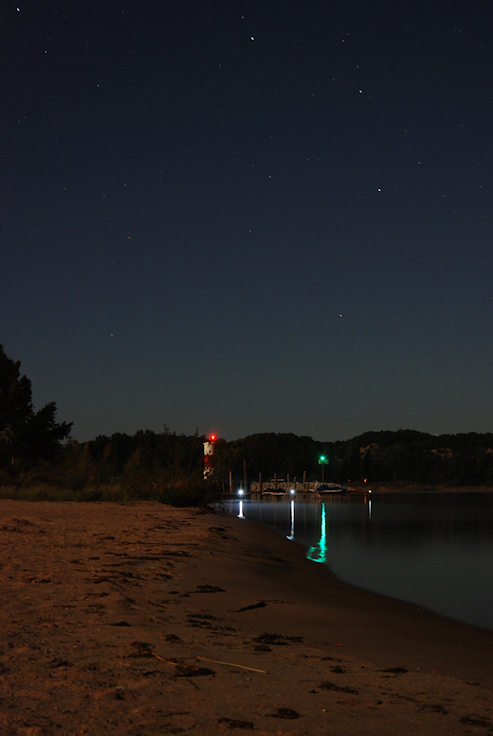
Muskegon Lake

Cities located on Muskegon Lake include Muskegon, Michigan and North Muskegon, Michigan. Major parks located along Muskegon Lake include Muskegon State Park on the north at Lake Michigan, Heritage Landing in downtown Muskegon, and Pere Marquette Park on the south at Lake Michigan.

== Transportation ==
Docks for the Lake Express Cross-Lake Ferry which provides ferry service across Lake Michigan between Muskegon, Michigan to Milwaukee, Wisconsin, are located on the southern shore of Muskegon Lake. Muskegon Lake sightseeing trips are also available aboard the Aquastar (formerly the Port City Princess).

== Recreational activities ==
Several public and private marinas and boat launch facilities are located along the shores of Muskegon Lake and recreational sailing and boating are popular activities. Sport fishing is also popular on Muskegon Lake where King Salmon, Coho Salmon, Steelhead, Brown Trout, Lake Trout and Perch are found. Other popular activities include camping, hiking, picnicking, ice boating, concerts and festivals.

== See also ==
- List of lakes in Michigan
