= Crystal Beach Hill =

Sand dune in Crystal Beach, Ontario

Coordinates: 42.861°N 79.058°W

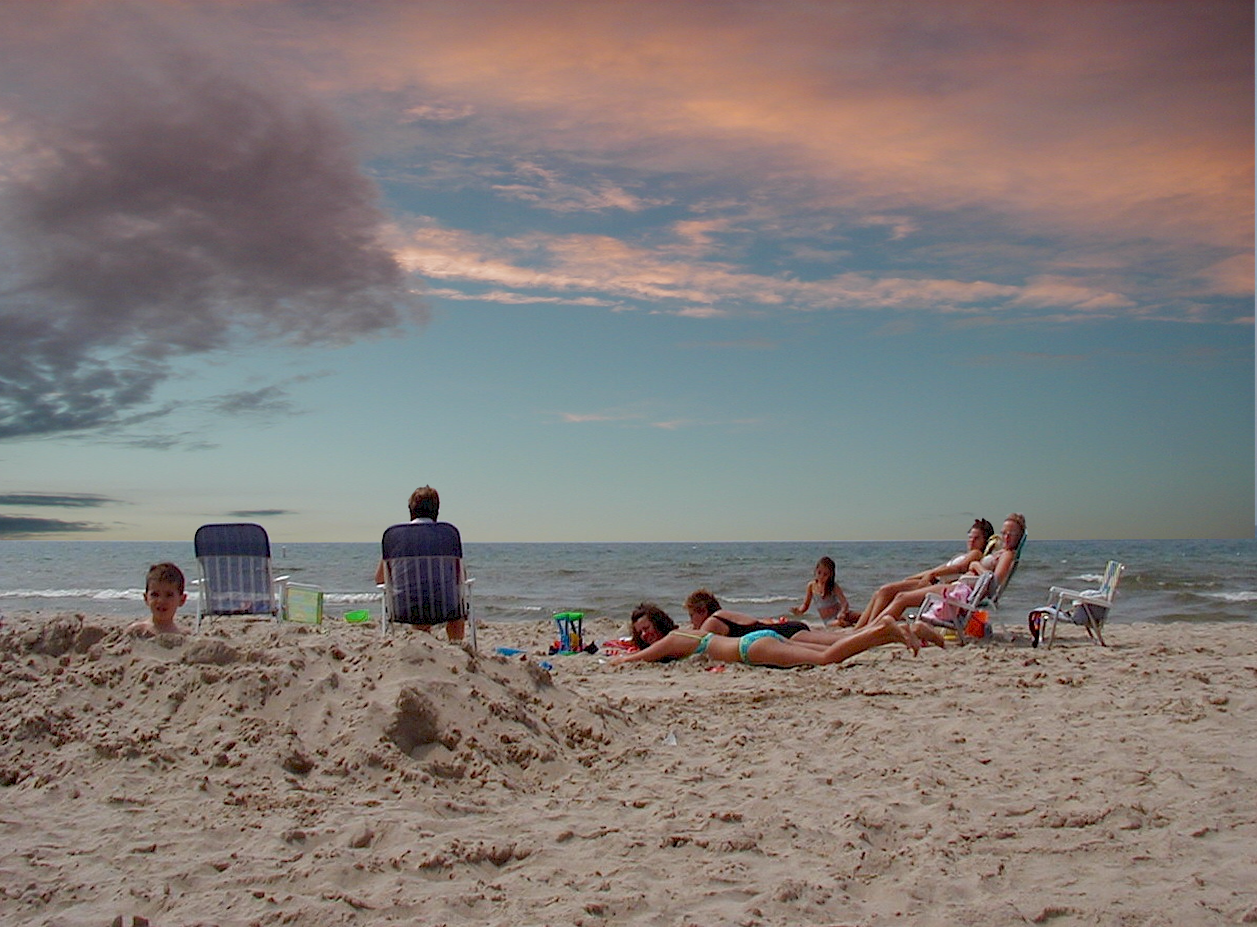
The beach at Crystal Beach Hill.

Crystal Beach Hill is a geologically old and natural sand dune, 50 feet (15 m) high and originally about 2,000 feet (610 m) long, parallel to the shoreline of Crystal Beach on the south-eastern shore of Lake Erie, in the town of Fort Erie, Ontario. The Hill and beach were originally a part of the Crystal Beach Park property first developed in 1888 by John E. Rebstock as a health spa, religious campground, and later amusement park that was built where a portion of the pre-historic sand dune was washed away by Rebstock's hydraulic pumps.

The Hill was an area where early workers and park carnies were leased land by the Crystal Beach Company and allowed to build (usually) one-room shacks for their off-hours living quarters. Near the western foot of the Hill, three cottages were built as residences for the number of international customs and immigration officers required to handle the thousands of daily boat visitors to Crystal Beach Park and the adjoining beach.

In 1983, with the amusement park in financial difficulties, the Crystal Beach Company sold the land comprising the Hill jointly to its residents. The 40 shacks that were built on the dune, for and by park workers, are now fully equipped summer homes that front directly on the beach. Including the three cottages formerly used for customs officers, these 43 homes now comprise a gated community called the Crystal Beach Hill Association (formerly the Crystal Beach Hill Cottagers Organization).
