= SS Aquarama =

Multi-purpose ship (1945–2007)

- The Aquarama in 1956

History
- Name: Marine Star (1945—1955); Aquarama (1955—1994); Marine Star (1994—2007)
- Builder: Sun Shipbuilding & Drydock Co., Chester, Pa.
- Yard number: 357; USMC #752
- Laid down: 18 October 1944
- Launched: 30 April 1945
- Completed: Delivery: 28 July 1945
- Maiden voyage: 1945
- In service: 1945
- Identification: Marine Star: US Official Number: 248329; Signal AODM; Auuarama: Signal and radio call sign: WG9376; IMO number: 5021114 (later)
- Fate: Sold for scrap in Aliağa, Turkey, 2007

General characteristics Marine Star as built
- Type: C4-S-B5 breakbulk cargo
- Tonnage: 10,780 GRT, 7,533 NRT
- Length: 495 ft (150.9 m) registry
- Beam: 71.7 ft (21.9 m)
- Depth: 20.9 ft (6.4 m)
- Installed power: 9.000 ihp
- Propulsion: Steam turbine, single screw
- Crew: 66

General characteristics Aquarama
- Type: Passenger Ship
- Tonnage: 12,773 GRT, 10,894 NRT
- Displacement: 10,600 tons
- Length: 520 ft (158.5 m) (overall); 495 ft (150.9 m) registry
- Beam: 71.7 ft (21.9 m)
- Depth: 20.9 ft (6.4 m)
- Decks: 9
- Installed power: 9,000 horsepower
- Propulsion: Steam turbine, single screw
- Speed: 22 kn (25 mph; 41 km/h)
- Capacity: 2,500 passengers
- Crew: 189

SS Aquarama was a breakbulk cargo ship of the United States Maritime Commission (USMC) type C4-S-B5 having that C4 design variant. The ship was delivered to the War Shipping Administration (WSA) for operation in July 1945 just before the end of World War II. She was operated until August 1946 by WSA's agent American Hawaiian SS Company. From September 1947, she was laid up except for brief periods in the James River.

In 1952 the ship was converted to a passenger ship, which became the largest passenger ship to ever operate in the Great Lakes.

== History ==
=== Marine Star ===
Marine Star was built by Sun Shipbuilding & Drydock Co., Chester, Pennsylvania as one of five United States Maritime Commission (USMC) type C4-S-B5 breakbulk cargo ships, yard hull number 357, USMC hull number 752. The ship's keel was laid 18 October 1944, launched on 30 April 1945 and delivery to the War Shipping Administration (WSA) on 28 July 1945.

The ship was registered as a freighter with U.S. Official Number 248329, signal AODM, at 10,780 GRT, 7,533 NRT, registered length of 495 ft (150.9 m), 71.7 ft (21.9 m) beam, 20.9 ft (6.4 m) depth, crew of 66 with owner being the War Shipping Administration and home port of Philadelphia.

The American Hawaiian Steamship Company operated Marine Star for WSA under a General Agency Agreement for the remainder of the war and until 9 August 1946. The ship was then operated for short periods by other agents under various agreements including bareboat charter until the ship was placed in the James River Reserve Fleet on 15 September 1947. Except for a charter by Seas Shipping Company 12 May 1948 to 14 June 1949 the ship remained inactive until sold 29 June 1951 to Wisconsin & Michigan Steamship Company. Though sold, the ship remained in the James fleet until removed by the buyer in December 1952.

=== Aquarama ===
Wisconsin & Michigan Steamship Co., a subsidiary of Sand Products Company of Detroit, had Marine Star taken to Todd Shipyards at Brooklyn, New York, where her old superstructure was cut down. In September 1953, the ship was towed to Muskegon, Michigan where it was converted into a commercial passenger ship by Steel Fabricating of Muskegon. The entire process took approximately two years to complete and cost nearly $8 million. The president of the Sand Products Corporation at the time, Max McKee, wanted the Aquarama to be an ocean liner for the Great Lakes. In 1955, ownership of the vessel was transferred to Michigan-Ohio Navigation Company, another subsidiary of Sand Products Corporation.

Registry information for 1957 shows Aquarama with no change in official number but the new signal and radio call sign WG9379 with 12,773 GRT, 10,894 NRT and other parameters unchanged and owned by Sand Products Corporation (Michigan) with port of registry Wilmington, Delaware. Other modifications were a 21.5 ft (6.6 m), 10 ton bronze propeller.

Aquarama began operation in 1956 by touring various Great Lakes ports. In 1957 the Michigan-Ohio Navigation Company, began service from Detroit to Cleveland, carrying automobiles and passengers. Once in service, the ship was able to transport its passengers and their automobiles from Detroit to Cleveland in under six hours.

Although the ship was immensely popular, it never generated enough revenue to be self-supporting; On September 4, 1962, the ship made its last trip, laying up at the Mart Dock in Muskegon, Michigan. Operating the ship from Muskegon, Michigan to Milwaukee as a replacement for the older Milwaukee Clipper was proposed, but $700,000 for dredging so the Aquarama could be accommodated in Milwaukee harbor was needed. As a result, the ship sat idle until 1987 when it was sold to the North Shore Farming Company for around $3 million.

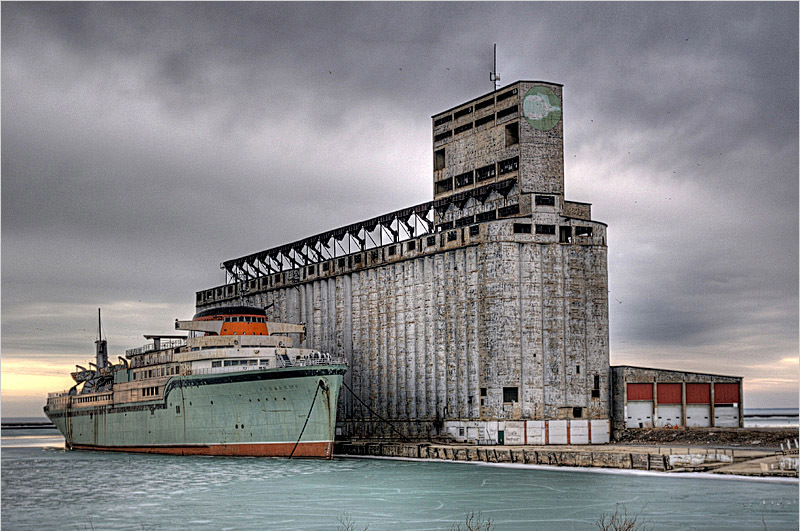
The SS Aquarama (Marine Star) docked in Buffalo, New York (March 2007)

Aquarama was briefly docked at Sarnia, then Windsor before returning to its original name of Marine Star in 1995 and moving under tow to Buffalo. On August 3, 1995, the Marine Star was berthed at the Cargill Pool Elevator where it stayed until it was towed overseas to Aliağa, Turkey for scrap in September 2007.

==== Capacity and Safety ====
As a cruise liner, Aquarama was able to carry 2,500 passengers and 160 automobiles. Some of the ship's safety features included its all-steel construction, the smoke detection system, four 135-passenger lifeboats, the latest in radar, and closed circuit television for viewing the stern.

==== Entertainment ====
On the ship there were numerous sources of entertainment for the passengers. Among many other things there was a "carnival room" that had a gift shop, games, and a photo booth. Two television theaters were available to be used for conferences or special programs. Along with the theaters, the ship contained two dance floors that were accompanied by a stage for an orchestra, or other performances. For those traveling with their families, there were even baby-sitting services available. People had the choice of four different types of restaurants that varied in style and price. Along with the restaurants, there was a main cafeteria that was able to fit nearly 300 people.

== See also ==
- SS Canadiana
- Type C4-class ship
- Aquastar (ship)
