= Aquastar (ship) =

Aquastar is a Great Lakes cruise boat, operated by Aquastar Cruises. She gives public and private charter cruises on Muskegon Lake and Lake Michigan.

== History ==
The former Mackinac Island ferry boat was purchased by Sylvia Precious and her husband Ralph and brought to Muskegon, Michigan in the spring of 1987. She was rechristened, Port City Princess.

For about 30 years under the Precious family's operation the Port City Princess hosted not only dinner and sunset cruises, she has also hosted weddings and corporate outings.

== Current service with Aquastar Cruises ==
In 2008, when the Precious family matriarch Silvia Precious retired, the boat was being optioned by an out of town buyer to move to a Northern Michigan port. To keep the boat in Muskegon, the Sand Products Corporation purchased the Port City Princess and extensively upgraded her, this included a number of aesthetic and structural renovations which featured a modern deco theme. This also included the boat being painted aqua, gray, red and white with its name on the back and the owners obtaining a liquor license.

The cruise boat was rechristened, Aquastar on August 3, 2018, by Miss Michigan and Miss Shoreline. The name and color scheme pays homage to the SS Aquarama, the largest passenger ferry ever on the Great Lakes.

She continues to offer both private charters and public cruises along with a wide variety of specialty cruises throughout the sailing season.

== See also ==
SS Aquarama
