= Derek Clendening =

Canadian writer

- Born: November 18, 1981 (age 44); Fort Erie, Ontario
- Occupations: Novelist, Short story writer
- Writing career
- Genres: Horror fiction, dark romanticism,

Derek Clendening (born November 18, 1981, in Fort Erie, Ontario) is a Canadian writer who primarily focuses on horror fiction and related non-fiction.

With Dark Scribe Magazine he has published numerous interviews with notable horror authors such as Joe Nassise and Greg Lamberson. His story Season's Tickets" was published in Blood Lite 2 from Pocketbooks.

== Fiction ==
"Season's Tickets" Blood Lite 2 ed. Kevin J Anderson, Pocketbooks (2010)

== Non-Fiction ==
"Robert Dunbar: Literary Patience and The Pines" March 2009 Dark Scribe Magazine

"Wrath James White: Of Gore and Grotesqueries" December 2008 Dark Scribe Magazine

"Edward Lee: Deconstructing Market Expectations" October 2008 Dark Scribe Magazine

"Richard's Reconstruction: Kelly Laymon Revisits The Woods Are Dark" August 2008 Dark Scribe Magazine

"Of Sequels and Success: An Interview with Mary San Giovanni" July 2008 Dark Scribe Magazine

"Secret Minds of Editors" July 2008 Dark Scribe Magazine

"Of Terrors and Translations: An Interview with Joe Nassise" June 2008 Dark Scribe Magazine

"Lunch with Lamberson: A Conversation with Buffalo's Slime Guy" May 2008 Dark Scribe Magazine
