= SS Canadiana =

Passenger excursion steamer

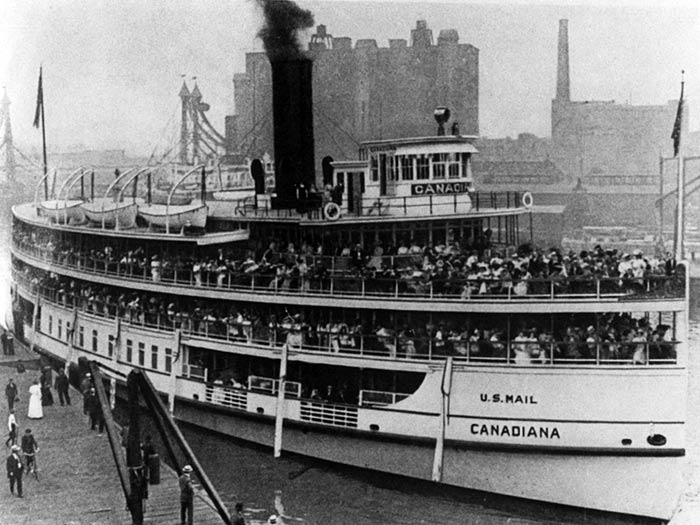
- Canadiana during her inaugural trip on May 30, 1910

History
- Name: Canadiana
- Owner: Lake Erie Excursion Company (1910–1924); Buffalo and Crystal Beach Corporation (1924–1947); Crystal Beach Transit Company (1947–1956); Seaway Excursion Lines (1958–1959); Toledo Excursion Lines, Inc. (1959–1960); Lucas County Bank (June–December 1960); Pleasurama Excursion Lines, Inc. (1960–1966); S. Parella of Cleveland, Ohio (1966–1967); Mobrays Floating Equipment Exchange Inc. (March 7–15, 1967); Waterman Steamship Corporation (1967–1968); Tropicana Products Inc. (March 20–28, 1968); Sea-Land Service Inc. (March–April 1968); Maritime Administration (April–June 1968); Jim Vinci of Cleveland Ohio (June 1968 – May 1983); Northrup Contracting Company (May 1983 – April 1984); Friends of the Canadiana (April 1984 – June 1993); Canadiana Restoration Project (1993–onward)
- Builder: Buffalo Dry Dock Company of Buffalo, New York
- Cost: $250,000
- Yard number: 215
- Launched: March 15, 1910
- Maiden voyage: May 30, 1910
- Identification: US 207479
- Nickname(s): "The Crystal Beach Boat"
- Fate: Remaining hull scrapped at Port Colborne, Ontario, Canada, in 2004

General characteristics
- Type: Passenger ferry
- Tonnage: 974 GRT; 427 NRT
- Length: 215 ft (66 m)
- Beam: 54 ft (16 m)
- Height: 16.1 ft (4.9 m)
- Decks: 3
- Installed power: Detroit Ship Building Company 1910 Coal fired triple-expansion steam engine; Piston #1: 20 in (51 cm); Piston #2: 30 in (76 cm); Piston #3: 50 in (130 cm); Stroke length: 36 in (91 cm); 1,446 shp
- Propulsion: Single propeller
- Capacity: 3,500 passengers (when launched) 1,800 passengers (downrated)

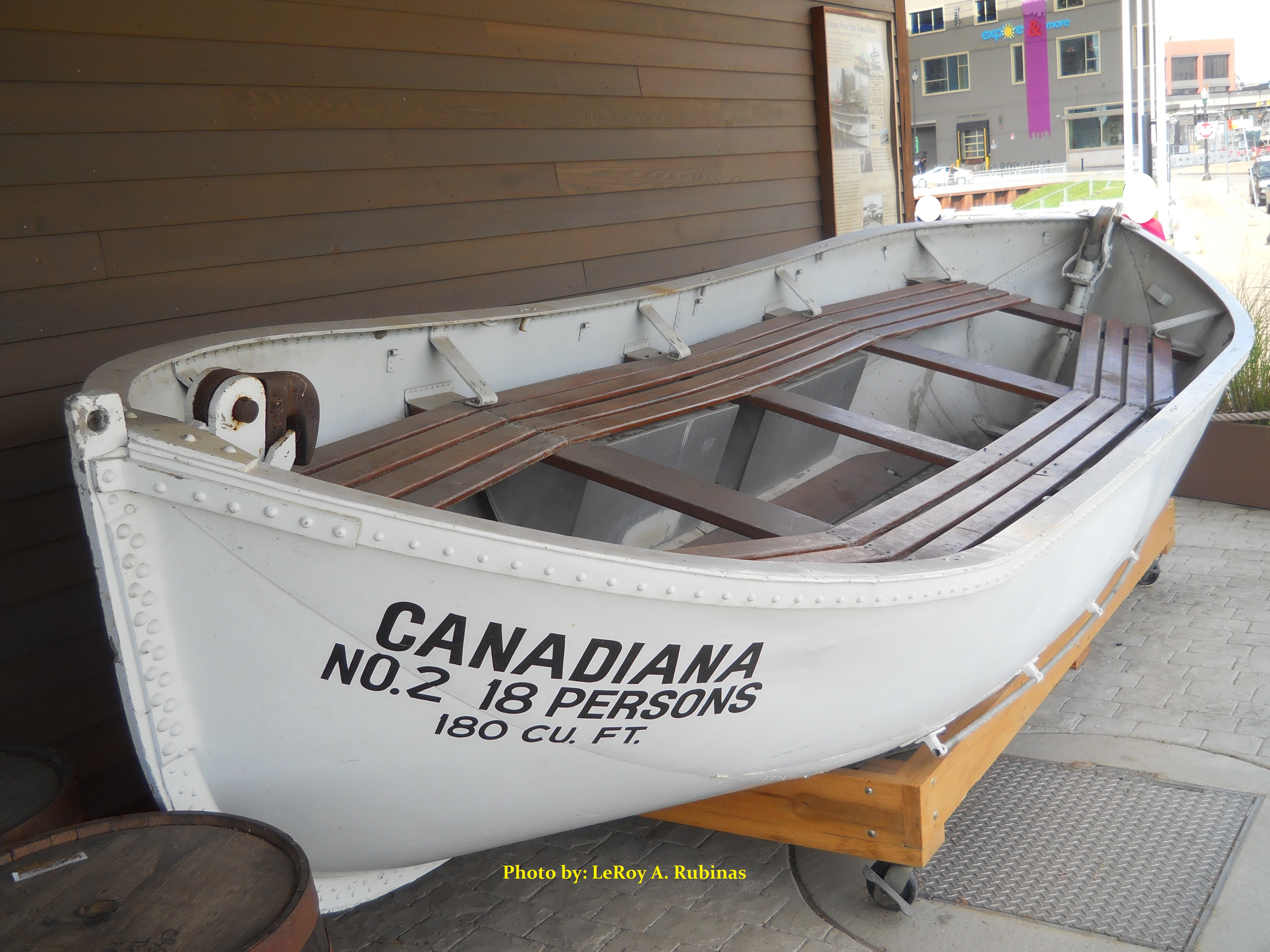
A Canadiana lifeboat at Buffalo Maritime Center Canalside, Buffalo, New York.

SS Canadiana was a passenger excursion steamer that primarily operated between Buffalo, New York, United States, and the Crystal Beach Park in Crystal Beach, Ontario, Canada, from 1910 to 1956. Canadiana was the last passenger vessel built in Buffalo.

After being sold in 1956 Canadiana changed owners numerous times, and by 1983 she was berthed in Ohio needing major restoration. A nonprofit group, the "Friends of the Canadiana", brought the ship back to Buffalo in 1984 with a hope of restoring her to service. When restoration efforts failed the ship was scrapped at Port Colborne, Ontario, in 2004.

== Construction ==
Canadiana was built at the Buffalo Dry Dock on Ganson Street in 1910 and was the last passenger vessel to be built in Buffalo, New York. She was designed by marine architect Frank E. Kirby, who later designed the largest side wheel overnight steamers built for the Great Lakes, Greater Buffalo and Greater Detroit.

The completed ship was 215 feet (66 m) long with a 54-foot (16 m) beam amidships. She was powered by one triple-expansion steam engine that produced 1,446 indicated horsepower (1,078 kW); a single propeller provided propulsion. Canadiana had a cutout in the main deck to allow passengers to view the "workings" of the engine.

Canadiana was fitted with brass railings, red mahogany trim from Honduras and beveled mirrors. She was designed to be a premier vessel designed not only for transportation but also for pleasure. Originally intended to carry 3,500 passengers, it was decided by the United States Coast Guard that 1,800 was a safer number. With the reduction in passenger capacity, the ship's owners found room to construct the largest dance floor of any steamer that sailed the Great Lakes.

== History ==
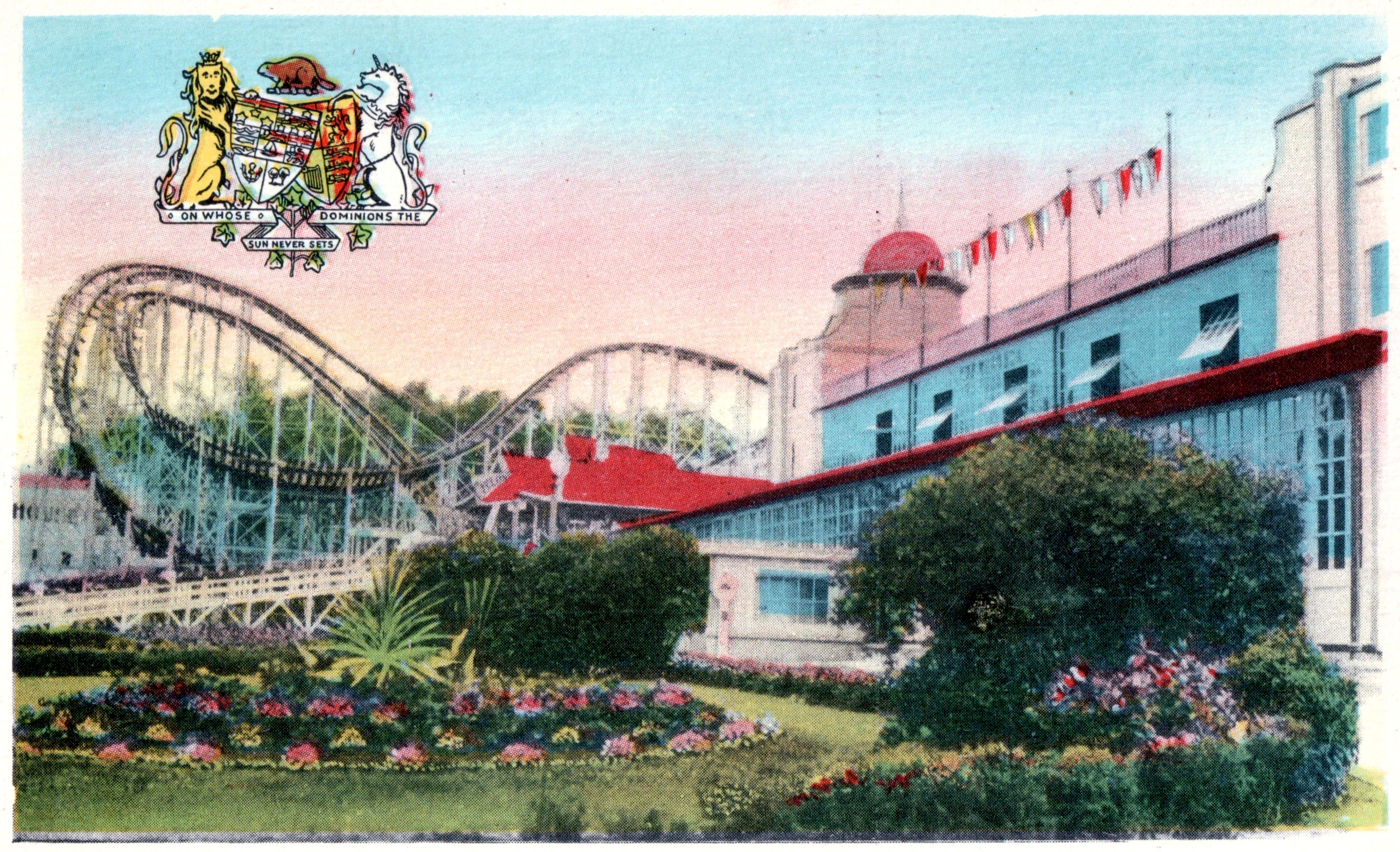
The Crystal Beach Amusement Park (just west of Fort Erie), Ontario, Canada, as it appeared in the early 1960s

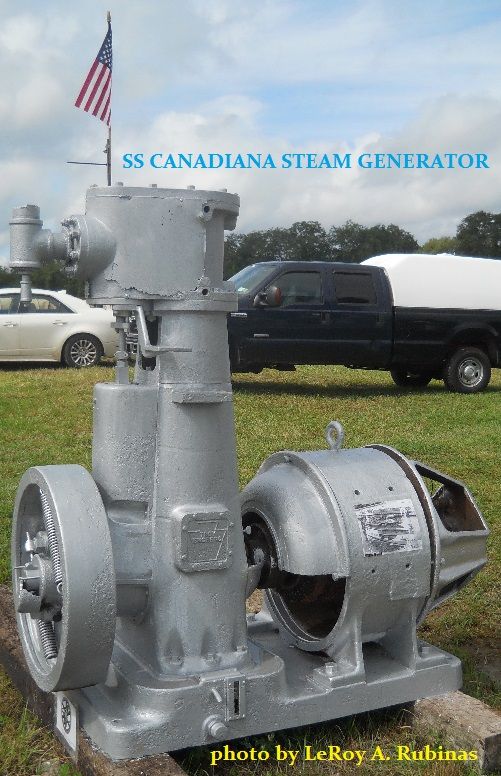
Canadiana's reciprocating steam driven electric generator at the 56th Annual Steam Show in Alexander, New York.

After her completion, Canadiana joined her sister ship, Americana, which had been built in 1908. Both ships made round-trip passages between Buffalo and Crystal Beach until Americana was sold in 1929. Although Canadiana was popularly known as "The Crystal Beach Boat", she occasionally made journeys to other destinations including Port Colborne, Ontario, while Crystal Beach remained her primary destination. During her crossings between Crystal Beach and Buffalo big band concerts were often held aboard with performances by some of the region's most famous musical acts, including some that regularly performed within the park's large Ballroom Building.

After the completion of the Peace Bridge in 1927, which allowed automobile traffic between Buffalo and Crystal Beach, Canadiana became less popular. Ticket prices were kept low to attract enough passengers to make the ship profitable. During World War II, Canadiana saw an increase in business due, in part, to wartime gasoline rationing. A British pilot with the Royal Canadian Air Force was killed when he lost control of his aircraft while "buzzing" Canadiana during the war.

In her last year of service an "incident" happened on board Canadiana. While returning from Crystal Beach to Buffalo on the evening of May 30, 1956, violence erupted between several youths. The group of belligerents, made up of whites and African-Americans, left little doubt that racism was a factor in the incident. This incident, along with shrinking revenues, made continued operation of the ship uneconomical. The 1956 season proved to be the last for Canadiana and she was sold.

After being sold, Canadiana was involved in an accident on July 30, 1958. While on her normal excursion trip traveling upstream on the Maumee River from Bob-Lo Island to her berth in Toledo, Ohio Canadiana was struck by a railroad swing bridge and damaged. Canadiana was sold in 1960 and was towed to Cleveland, Ohio, being unofficially renamed Pleasurama. From 1960 through 1967 Canadiana was stored at Buffalo, Fairport and Cleveland. She sank at her berth in Cleveland on February 17, 1982, and was not refloated until May 1983. Following her refloat, she was moved to Ashtabula, Ohio.

A second Americana, formally a 1940s-built ferry-cruise boat for the Circle Line, was placed in service to Crystal Beach during the 1988–89 seasons, with mixed profits. After the park's closure, the ship was used for lake cruises. Her owners, among them proprietor Ramsey Tick, filed for bankruptcy in 1990, and the small ship was later sold to Caribbean interests.

=== Restoration efforts ===
==== Friends of the Canadiana ====
A non-profit group called the "Friends of the Canadiana" was formed in 1983 to try to save the ship and restore her to service. A fund raising effort was undertaken and she was purchased by the group. Canadiana was towed back to Buffalo during September 1984. In July 1988, after being stripped down for restoration to return her to sailing conditions under modern regulations, Canadiana was towed to the Marsh Engineering Dock at Port Colborne, Ontario, for drydocking.

==== The S.S. Canadiana Preservation Society, Inc. ====
During 1993 changes were implemented regarding the restoration efforts. On July 1, 1993, the name of the organization was changed to The S.S. Canadiana Preservation Society, Inc. Along with the name change, membership of the corporation board of directors was undertaken and efforts were made for the corporation to be designated as an "Education Corporation". These changes were undertaken by the organization with the eventual goal of being accredited as a full-fledged museum.

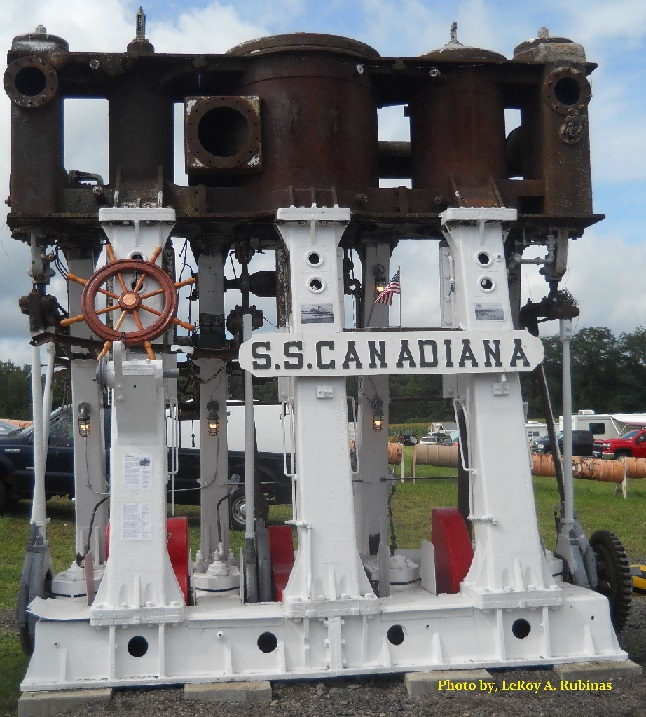
Triple expansion steam engine from Canadiana. Built in 1910 on display at 56th annual Steam Show in Alexander, New York. On September 10, 2023, the engine featured new paint and four industrial lights to wow patrons.

A number of studies on the ship and her use were carried out in the 1990s. The S.S. Canadiana Preservation Society applied for, and was awarded on December 8, 1994, a US$400,000 grant under the Intermodal Surface Transportation Enhancement Act for the restoration efforts. Following the award, in 1995, the award funding was withdrawn by the New York State Department of transportation and a lawsuit was filed by The S.S. Canadiana Preservation Society. The final outcome of the court case was that the withdrawal of funding by the New York State Department of Transportation was upheld.

=== Scrapping ===
When restoration plans were not realized the remaining hull of Canadiana was cut up for scrap in 2004 at Port Colbourne, Ontario. The ship's engine was salvaged and returned to Buffalo to be part of a planned exhibit. Much of the wooden superstructure, including the pilot house, was saved. Some of the salvaged wood was made into various memorabilia.

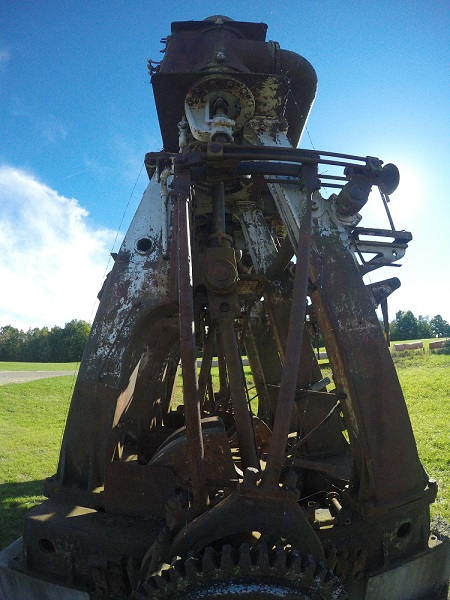
Canadiana triple expansion steam engine on display in Alexander, New York, as part of the WNY Gas & Steam Engine Association

== See also ==
- Aquarama
- Edward M. Cotter
