= Inga Clendinnen =

Australian author, historian, anthropologist, and academic (1934 – 2016)

Inga Clendinnen AO FAHA
- Clendinnen at the 2008 Adelaide Writers' Week
- Born: Inga Vivienne Jewell; 17 August 1934; Geelong, Australia
- Died: 8 September 2016 (aged 82); Melbourne, Australia
- Awards: Herbert Eugene Bolton Memorial Prize (1988); Fellow of the Australian Academy of the Humanities (1992); Centenary Medal (2003); Australian Society of Authors Medal (2005); Officer of the Order of Australia (2006); Dan David Prize (2016)

Academic background
- Education: University of Melbourne; La Trobe University

Academic work
- Institutions: University of Melbourne (1956–68); La Trobe University (1969–91)
- Main interests: Mesoamerica; European contact with indigenous populations

Inga Vivienne Clendinnen, AO, FAHA (née Jewell; 17 August 1934 – 8 September 2016) was an Australian author, historian, anthropologist, and academic. Her work focused on social history, and the history of cultural encounters. She was an authority on Aztec civilisation and pre-Columbian ritual human sacrifice. She also wrote about the Holocaust and on first contacts between Indigenous Australians and white explorers. At her death, she was an Emeritus Scholar at La Trobe University, Melbourne.

== Early life and education ==
Clendinnen was born in Geelong, Victoria, on 17 August 1934. She was the youngest of four children. Her father owned a cabinet-making business and later became a Geelong City Councillor; her mother was a homemaker. Clendinnen graduated from the University of Melbourne in 1955 with a Bachelor of Arts with Honours, followed by a Master of Arts in 1975.

== Career ==
Clendinnen's work focused on social history, and the history of cultural encounters. She was considered an authority on Aztec civilisation and pre-Columbian ritual human sacrifice. She also wrote on the Holocaust, and on first contacts between Indigenous Australians and white explorers.

Clendinnen held the post of senior tutor of History at the University of Melbourne from 1955 to 1968, was a lecturer at La Trobe University from 1969 to 1982, and was then a senior lecturer in History until 1989. Forced to curtail her academic activities after contracting hepatitis in 1991, Clendinnen began working on her memoir, Tiger's Eye, which focused on issues of illness and death. She retained an association with La Trobe University, however, as she was appointed Emeritus Scholar.

In 1999, she was invited to present the 40th annual Boyer Lectures. The ideas presented in these lectures, concerning first contacts in Australia, were later published as True Stories.

In the Australia Day 2006 Honours List, Clendinnen was appointed an Officer of the Order of Australia (AO), with a citation that read:

For service to scholarship as a writer and historian addressing issues of fundamental concern to Australian society and for contributing to shaping public debate on conflicting contemporary issues.

Clendinnen's AO award was noted and a motion paying tribute to her contributions was passed, in the proceedings of the New South Wales State Parliament's Upper House.

== Personal life and death ==
Clendinnen married the philosopher of science John Clendinnen in 1955, and had two children with him. Clendinnen died on 8 September 2016 after a short illness.

== Awards and nominations ==
- 1988 – received the Herbert Eugene Bolton Memorial Prize for Ambivalent Conquests
- 1999 – winner of the NSW History Awards, Premier's General History Prize for Reading the Holocaust
- 1999 – winner of the National Jewish Book Award in the Holocaust category for Reading the Holocaust
- 1999 – Reading the Holocaust was judged Best Book of the Year by The New York Times
- 2000 – New South Wales Premier's Literary Awards, Gleebooks Prize for Critical Writing for Reading the Holocaust
- 2002 – received the Adelaide Festival Award for Innovation for Tiger's Eye
- 2003 – received the New South Wales Premier's History Award for her piece "History Here: a Vier from Outside"
- 2004 – New South Wales Premier's Literary Awards, Douglas Stewart Prize for Non-fiction for Dancing with Strangers
- 2005 – recipient of the ASA (Australian Society of Authors) biennial medal
- 2006 – Appointed Officer of the Order of Australia for her services as a writer and historian.
- 2007 – received the Philip Hodgins Memorial Medal
- 2016 – Dan David Prize

== Bibliography ==
=== Books ===
- Ambivalent Conquests: Maya and Spaniard in Yucatán, 1517–1570 (1987)
- Aztecs: An Interpretation (1991)
- Reading the Holocaust (1998)
- True Stories (1999)
- Tiger's Eye: A Memoir (2000)
- Dancing with Strangers: Europeans and Australians at First Contact (2003)
- True Stories: History, Politics, Aboriginality (2008) (2nd ed.)
- The Cost of Courage in Aztec Society: Essays on Mesoamerican Society and Culture (2010)

=== Essays and Essay Collections ===
- Agamemnon's Kiss: Selected Essays (2006)
- "The History Question: Who Owns the Past?" (2006) (from the 23rd edition of Quarterly Essay)
- Inga Clendinnen: Selected Writings edited by James Boyce (2021)

=== Selected articles ===
- Clendinnen, Inga. "Backstage at the Republic of Letters" (PDF). Proceedings of the Australian Academy of the Humanities. 28 (2003): 96–107. Archived from the original (PDF) on 11 April 2011.
- — (April 2009). "The good soldier: WEH Stanner & "An Appreciation of Difference"". The Monthly. 44: 56–61. Review of Hinkson, Melinda; Beckett, Jeremy, eds. (2008). An appreciation of difference : W E H Stanner and Aboriginal Australia. Canberra: Aboriginal Studies Press. ISBN 9780855756604.
