= F. John Clendinnen =

Australian philosopher (1924–2013)

F. John Clendinnen (23 August 1924 – 25 July 2013) was an Australian philosopher of science interested in induction and empiricism.

== Early life and education ==
His father, Leslie John Clendinnen and grandfather, Frederick John Clendinnen were radiologists at several hospitals in Melbourne, Australia, where Clendinnen lived. After the Second World War he commenced an undergraduate degree at the University of Melbourne.

== Career ==
After graduating with honours in philosophy Clendinnen was employed by the University of Melbourne at the newly created History and Philosophy of Science Department in the Faculty of Arts. He remained in the same department, eventually reaching the rank of reader, and retired in 1989. He was a visiting lecturer at the Philosophy department at the University of Pittsburgh and also at the History and Philosophy department of Indiana University, as well as being a visitor at Princeton University. In 1955 he married the noted Australian historian Inga Clendinnen (née Jewell).

== Publications ==
- Induction and Objectivity, 1970.
