= Crystal Beach Park =

Former amusement park in Crystal Beach, Ontario

- Interactive map of Crystal Beach Park
- Location: Crystal Beach, Ontario
- Coordinates: 42.863034°N 79.060287°W
- Status: Defunct
- Opened: May 28, 1888
- Closed: September 4, 1989
- Owner: John E. Rebstock (1888-1908); Lake Erie Excursion Co. (1908-1924); George C. Hall (1924-1972); Van Hall (1972-1983); Canadian Imperial Bank of Commerce (1983-1984); Crystal Beach Park Limited (1984-1989)
- Slogan: Buffalo's Coney Island
- Area: 100 acres (0.40 km^{2})

Crystal Beach Park was an amusement park in Crystal Beach, Ontario, from 1888 to 1989. It was serviced by the Canadiana passenger ferry in Buffalo, making it a popular tourist destination for both Canadians and Americans.

The park was known for its innovative roller coasters, most notably Backety-Back Scenic Railway, the Cyclone, and The Comet. The Comet was awarded Coaster Landmark status in 2009, and remains in operation at The Great Escape and Hurricane Harbor.

== History ==
=== John E. Rebstock (1888–1924) ===
Crystal Beach Park was originally a Chautauqua with a beach and side show attractions that was founded by John E. Rebstock on the shores of Lake Erie in 1888. Rebstock turned it into a full-fledged amusement park in 1890.

In 1896, the Ontario Southern Railway began to provide connection between the park and the mainline rail station in Ridgeway. This service consisted of a unique elevated monorail style train, and ran for only three summers, through 1898.

Boat service connected nearby Buffalo with the park. Initially, in the 1890s, a ferry service operated small boats with a capacity of 500 to 1,200.

The park's first roller coaster was a Figure 8 model that operated from 1905 to 1915.

=== Lake Erie Excursion Co. (1908-1924) ===
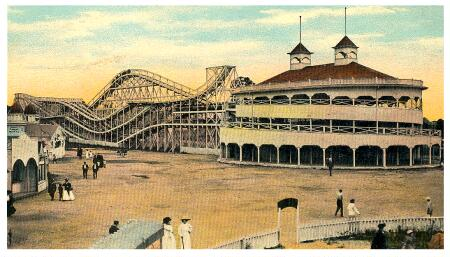
Backety-Back Scenic Railway, 1911.

Prior to the 1908 season John Rebstock, while maintaining ownership of the land, sold the physical assets of the Crystal Beach Park to the Lake Erie Excursion Company.

The Americana held 3,000 passengers and operated between 1908 and 1929. The Canadiana also held 3,000 passengers and operated between 1910 and 1956. A concrete pier was constructed to service the Americana and Canadiana in 1921.

The park's second roller coaster, Backety-Back Scenic Railway, operated from 1909 to 1926. The third was the Giant Coaster that began operation in 1916.

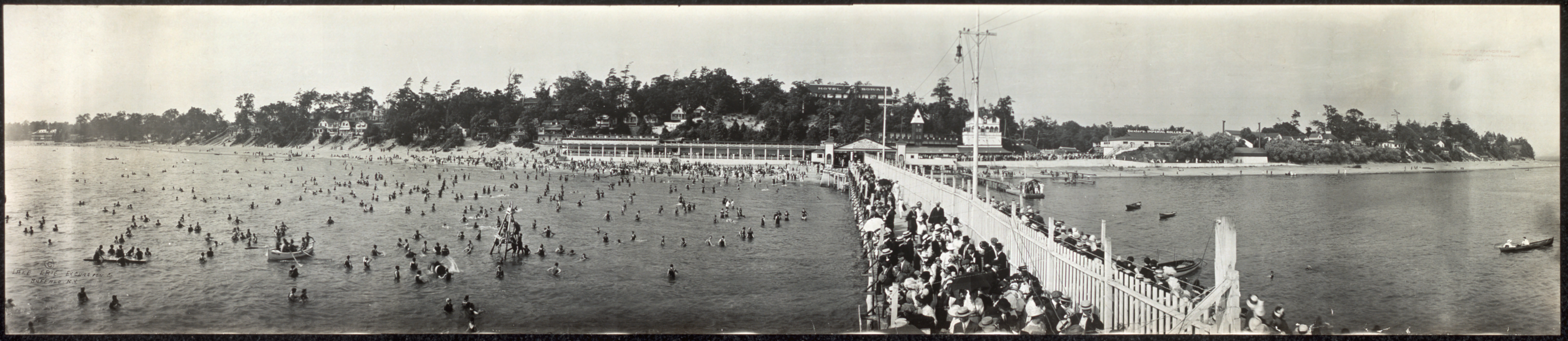
Crystal Beach Park, as seen from the end of the original wooden Canadiana pier, 1911.

=== George C. Hall and Van Hall (1924–1983) ===
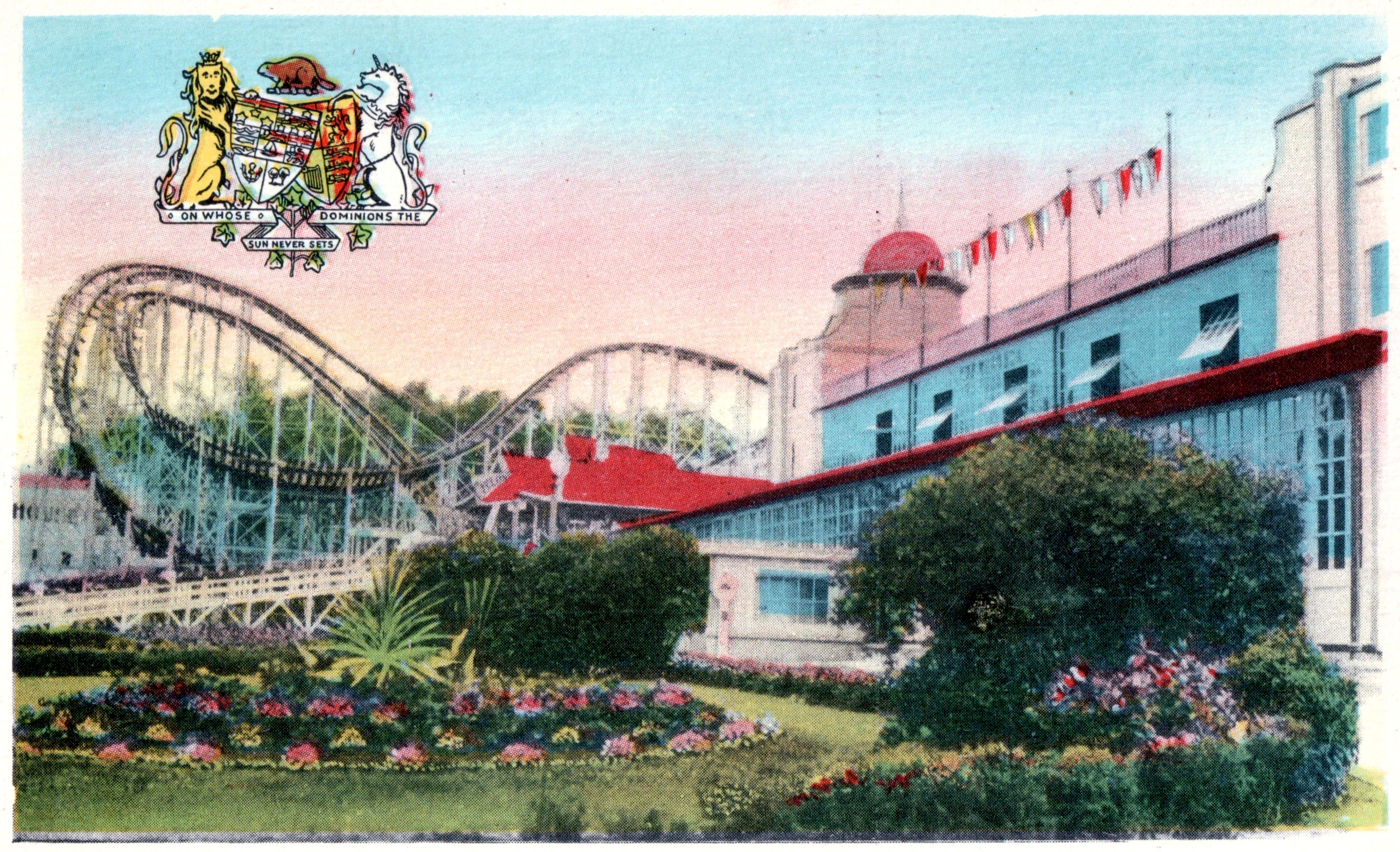
The Cyclone, next to the Crystal Ballroom, circa 1930s.

In 1924 the divided ownership of the park and the land ends with their acquisition by the Buffalo and Crystal Beach Company, of which George C. Hall was president and would fully own by 1948.

Hall had worked at the park for years running concessions, and was famous for his Gourmet Suckers. Rebstock would go on to open Bay Beach Park to the west of Crystal Beach Park in 1926.

Hall constructed the Crystal Ballroom in the winter of 1924. The dance hall's location required the addition of a concrete seawall and boardwalk along the park's border to Lake Erie. Many famous acts such as Count Basie, Frank Sinatra, Glenn Miller Orchestra, and Jelly Roll Morton played the Crystal Ballroom. Artie Shaw arrived late for his Labour Day performance at the venue in 1939, and the crowd of 7,000 rioted.

The Cyclone was added to the park in 1926. It was one of the Giant Cyclone Safety Coasters that were designed by Harry G. Traver, and known for their reputation as dangerous and terrifying. In 1947, the Cyclone was dismantled and its material was used to construct The Comet. The Comet is considered one of the greatest wooden coasters ever built, and was awarded Coaster Landmark status by American Coaster Enthusiasts.

At its peak in the 1940s and early 1950s, the park had about 20,000 visitors daily throughout the summer, from Victoria Day through Labour Day.

Boat service from Buffalo was discontinued after a race riot aboard the Canadiana in 1956.

George C. Hall died in 1972 and the park's ownership reverted to his estate. His grandson, Van Hall, purchased a controlling interest in the park.

=== Crystal Beach Park Limited (1984–1989) ===
By 1983, the park was losing business to Canada's Wonderland, Darien Lake, Fantasy Island, and Marineland of Canada. The park avoided bankruptcy by going into receivership and was taken over by Canadian Imperial Bank of Commerce. Crystal Beach Park Limited, an ownership group, bought the property out of receivership in 1984. Members of the ownership group included Edward Hall (son of George C. Hall), J. Allen Bernel, Joseph F. Biondolillo, and Rudy J. Bonifacio. Bernel died in 1985, and the remaining members bought out his interest in the park. They spent over $2 million during the next three seasons for renovations and improvements. Financial problems loomed again, however, and the park closed at the end of the 1989 season.

=== Legacy ===
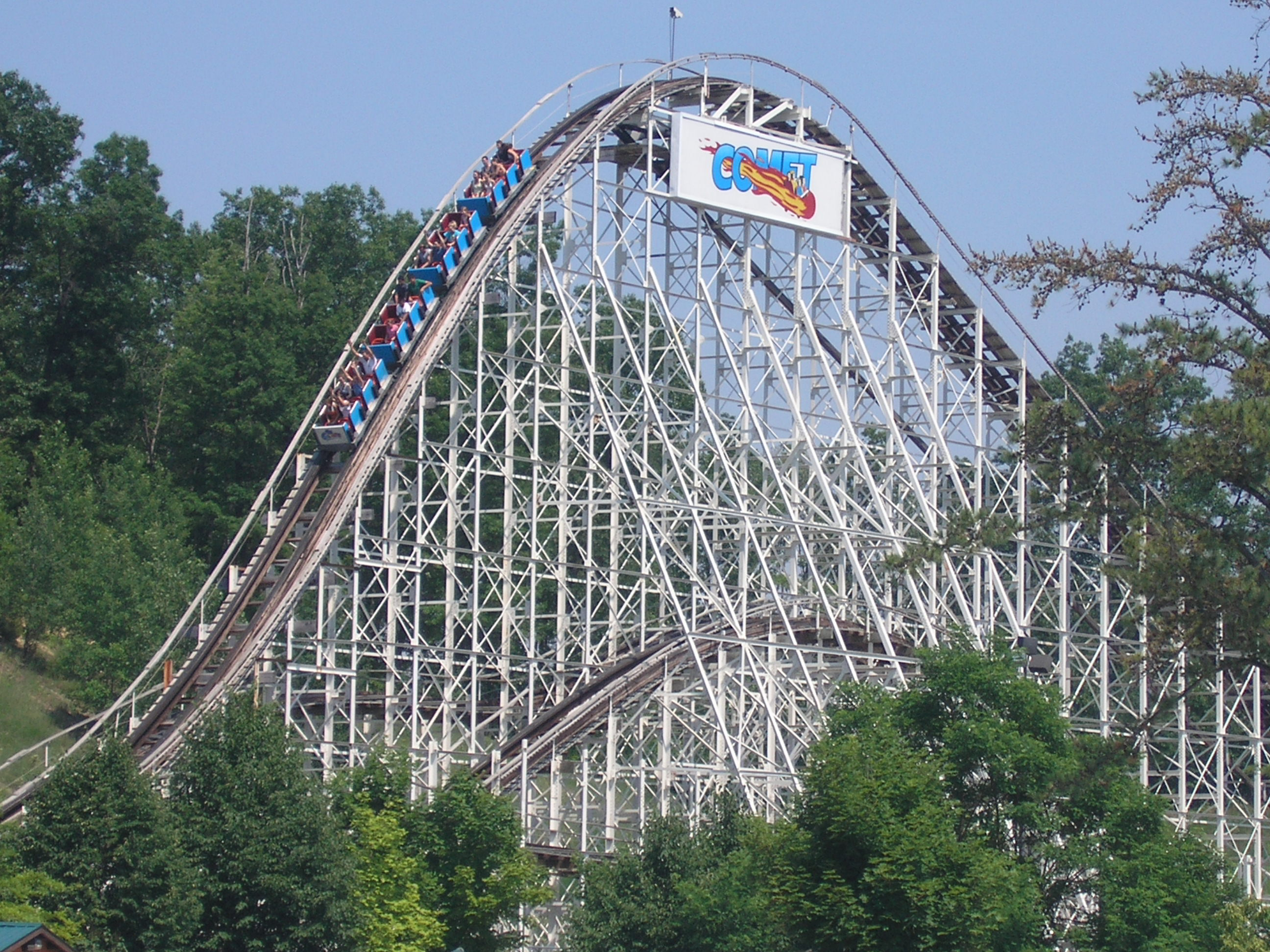
The Comet at The Great Escape and Hurricane Harbor, 2006.

Following the park's closure in 1989, the rides were sold at auction. The Comet was sold to Charles Wood and moved to The Great Escape and Hurricane Harbor in Queensbury, New York The Ferris wheel from the park was sold to Centreville Amusement Park in Toronto and remains in operation. The Giant Coaster, the oldest roller coaster in North America at the time, was bought for its cars and scrapped.

The gated community Crystal Beach Tennis & Yacht Club has occupied the park's land since 1992. The concrete pier that was built in 1921 and concrete seawall that was built in 1924 remain part of the complex. The housing development South Coast Village has occupied the park's former parking lot since 2016.

Crystal Beach Candy Company still produces Hall's Original Suckers and Crystal Beach Sugar Waffles using the park's original equipment. Coca-Cola still bottles and distributes PJ's Crystal Beach Loganberry, a drink the park made famous.

== Books ==
Several books have been written about the history of Crystal Beach Park:

- Crystal Memories: 101 Years of Fun at Crystal Beach Park - Rose Ann Jankowiak-Hirsch (2004)
- Crystal Beach: The Good Old Days - Erno Rossi (2005)
- Steamers of the Crystal Beach Line - William Kae (2007)
- Crystal Beach Live: Buffalo and Toronto Entertainers and More - William Kae (2009)
- Crystal Beach Park: A Century of Screams - William Kae (2011)
- Crystal Beach: Out of the Park - Gary Pooler (2022)

A queer Southern Ontario gothic novel set in the first summer (1990) after the park was closed, Sodom Road Exit by Amber Dawn, was published in 2018.

== Documentaries ==
Several documentaries have been produced about the history of Crystal Beach Park:

- The Life and Times of Crystal Beach - Pacific Productions (1994)
- I Remember Crystal Beach - WEX Studio (1998)
- Laugh in the Dark - Red Queen Productions (1999)
- The Canadiana and Crystal Beach - WEX Studio (1999)
- One Last Ride: Crystal Beach Amusement Park - Last Ride Productions (2000)
- Thanks For The Memories - RDPK Productions (2006)
- Remembering Crystal Beach Park - WNED-TV (2008)

== See also ==
- Crystal Beach Hill
