= Crystal Beach, Ontario =

Lakefront community in Fort Erie, Ontario

Crystal Beach
- Unincorporated community
- Bay Beach is the main beach in Crystal Beach, Ontario
- Nickname: The South Coast of Canada
- Location within Southern Ontario
- Coordinates: 42°52′3″N 79°3′33″W
- Country: Canada
- Province: Ontario
- Regional municipality: Niagara
- Town: Fort Erie

Area
  - Total: 11.34 km^{2} (4.38 sq mi)

Population (2016)
  - Total: 8,524
  - Density: 751.7/km^{2} (1,947/sq mi)
- Time zone: UTC-5 (EST)
  - Summer (DST): UTC-4 (EDT)
- Forward sortation area: L0S 1B0
- Area code: 905 / 289 / 365
- NTS Map: 30L14 Welland
- GNBC Code: FAUTT

Crystal Beach is a lakefront community in Fort Erie, Ontario, Canada. As of 2016, it had a population of 8,524. It was named for the "crystal clear" water conditions present when it was founded on the northeast shore of Lake Erie, across from Buffalo.

Crystal Beach Park occupied waterfront land within Crystal Beach from 1888 to 1989, turning the community into a popular resort town. It operated until 1989 when the park was closed permanently. It is now the site of private gated community.

Laugh in the Dark, a documentary about efforts to revitalize the community in the waning years of Crystal Beach Park, was released in 1999.

== History ==
The Crystal Beach settlement started as a police village with a summer post office in 1898; a year-round post office opened in 1908. The village was incorporated in 1928, with a population of 298. In 1970, the village was absorbed by Fort Erie, Ontario under the regional government scheme.

=== Bay Beach Park (1926-present) ===
In 1926, John E. Rebstock opened a public beach on land west of Crystal Beach Park called Bay Beach Park. It contained rental units, a snack bar, and a dance hall. Rebstock died in 1941, and his estate maintained the property until selling it to the Town of Fort Erie in 2001. A private developer planned to build a 12-story complex on the site called South Beach Condominiums, but the project was abandoned in 2014. Fort Erie has since renovated the site with modern amenities, and it was officially reopened in 2019.

=== Crystal Beach Hill Association (1983–present) ===
In the 1930s, Crystal Beach Park employees were allowed to build cottages on the Crystal Beach sand dune so that they could live near their jobs. The dune was called Crystal Beach Hill and eventually grew to 43 cottages. In 1983, residents of the land formed the Crystal Beach Hill Cottagers Organization, later renamed the Crystal Beach Hill Association, and purchased the land outright from the park's owner.

The Crystal Beach sign

=== Crystal Beach Tennis & Yacht Club (1992–present) ===
The land where Crystal Beach Park stood was converted into a gated community called Crystal Beach Tennis & Yacht Club in 1992. The concrete pier that was built in 1921 to service the Americana and Canadiana ferries remains part of the complex, albeit in a state of disrepair. The concrete seawall that was built in 1924 to reinforce the property also remains part of the complex.

=== Crystal Beach Waterfront Park (2005–present) ===
The town of Fort Erie has operated a public beach called Crystal Beach Waterfront Park to the east of Crystal Beach Tennis & Yacht Club since 2005. It features a boat launch and was next to the Palmwood restaurant which closed in 2021.

Pier that once served the Canadiana and Americana ferries.

=== South Coast Village (2016–present) ===
The land where the parking lot of Crystal Beach Park stood directly east of Crystal Beach Tennis & Yacht Club was converted into the upscale community South Coast Village in 2016.
