= Woodstock Express =

Woodstock Express (or Woodstock's Express) refers to seven family or kiddie roller coasters operated by Six Flags at former Cedar Fair parks, all of which are currently operating and are located in the Camp Snoopy/ Planet Snoopy section of each park:

- Woodstock Express (Cedar Point) a steel junior coaster at Cedar Point in Sandusky, Ohio
- Woodstock Express (Carowinds) a wooden roller coaster at Carowinds in Charlotte, North Carolina
- Woodstock Express (Kings Island) a wooden coaster at Kings Island near Cincinnati, Ohio
- Woodstock Express (Kings Dominion) a wooden coaster at Kings Dominion near Richmond, Virginia
- Woodstock Express (Dorney Park) a steel junior coaster at Dorney Park & Wildwater Kingdom in Allentown, Pennsylvania
- Woodstock Express (Michigan's Adventure) a steel family coaster at Michigan's Adventure in Muskegon, Michigan.
- Woodstock's Express (California's Great America) a relocated steel kiddie coaster at California's Great America in Santa Clara, California that had previously operated at the now defunct Hanna-Barbera Land in Spring, Texas
