= Nickelodeon in amusement parks =

Nickelodeon-themed amusement attractions

Since the 1990s, Nickelodeon, a worldwide children's television network and franchise, owned by Skydance, has had an involvement in the creation and theming of amusement parks rides.

Several amusement parks have featured themed areas entirely devoted to the Nickelodeon brand whilst others have featured standalone attractions. Nickelodeon attractions currently exist at Movie Park Germany, Pleasure Beach Blackpool, Mall of America, Sea World, and American Dream Meadowlands. Attractions previously existed at the former Paramount Parks (California's Great America, Canada's Wonderland, Carowinds, Kings Dominion, and Kings Island), as well as Dreamworld, Universal Studios Florida, Universal Studios Hollywood and WhiteWater World.

== History ==
On June 7, 1990, Universal Studios Florida opened with an attraction named Nickelodeon Studios. It was a television taping studio for the cable television channel Nickelodeon.

In 1995, Nickelodeon Splat City opened at three former Paramount Parks: California's Great America, Kings Dominion and Kings Island. These attractions were inspired by the game shows that aired on the television network and generally involved slime. In 1999, Kings Dominion closed Nickelodeon Splat City in preparation for the opening of its 2000 attraction, Nickelodeon Central. Nickelodeon Central brought a retheme of many of the park's children's rides as well as the addition of new ones. Kings Island followed suit, closing its Splat City in 2000 and opening Nickelodeon Central in 2001. This area would later be expanded and renamed Nickelodeon Universe in 2006.

In 2002, Australian theme park Dreamworld opened Nickelodeon Central. In 2003, Nickelodeon Central opened at California's Great America, Canada's Wonderland and Carowinds, and Jimmy Neutron's Nicktoon Blast opened in Universal Studios Florida. Expansions of these areas took place in 2005, 2006 and 2008 for Carowinds, Kings Island and Dreamworld, respectively. The Kings Island area was also renamed to Nickelodeon Universe at the same time. In 2007, Movie Park Germany opened a similar area entitled Nickland. In 2007, it was announced that Nickelodeon Universe would be opening in Mall of America in 2008, replacing Camp Snoopy. In 2009 and 2010, Cedar Fair terminated their contract with Nickelodeon resulting in all of the areas being rethemed to Planet Snoopy. In early 2011, at a cost of £10 million, Pleasure Beach Blackpool opened Nickelodeon Land. By mid-2011, Dreamworld had closed their Nickelodeon Central and rethemed it to the generic Kid's World theme (it was later revealed that the park had struck a deal with DreamWorks Animation). In 2012, Universal's Superstar Parade had its first performance which features floats based on SpongeBob SquarePants and Dora the Explorer and later opened a SpongeBob gift shop in Woody Woodpecker's Kidzone. In September 2016, it was announced that a new Nickelodeon Universe would open in the upcoming American Dream Meadowlands mall and entertainment complex owned by the Triple Five Group, which also owns the Mall of America. Nickelodeon Universe's American Dream location opened to visitors on 25 October 2019.

== Locations ==
Park	Area	Opening date	Closing date	Previous area	Replaced by
Alton Towers	Nickelodeon: Outta Control	1997	1998	—N/a	Frog Hopper
American Dream Meadowlands	Nickelodeon Universe	25 October 2019	—N/a	—N/a	—N/a
Blackpool Pleasure Beach	Nickelodeon Land	May 2011	—N/a	Beaver Creek children's park	—N/a
California's Great America	Nickelodeon Central	2000	2009	Hanna Barbera Land	Planet Snoopy
Canada's Wonderland	Nickelodeon Central	2003	2009	Hanna Barbera Land	Planet Snoopy
Carowinds	Nickelodeon Central	22 March 2003	2009	Happy Land of Hanna Barbera	Planet Snoopy
Dreamworld	Nickelodeon Central	26 December 2002	24 June 2011	Kennyland	Kid's World
Kings Dominion	Nickelodeon Central	2000	2009	Happy Land of Hanna Barbera	Planet Snoopy
Kings Island	Nickelodeon Universe	7 April 2001	2009	Happy Land of Hanna Barbera	Planet Snoopy
The Land of Legends	Nickelodeon Land	1 March 2025	—N/a	—N/a	—N/a
Tersane Istanbul	Nickelodeon Play!	28 November 2025	—N/a	—N/a	—N/a
Mall of America	Nickelodeon Universe	8 March 2008	—N/a	Camp Snoopy	—N/a
Movie Park Germany	Nickland	2007	—N/a	Unknown	—N/a
Parque de Atracciones de Madrid	Nickelodeon Land	April 2014	—N/a	Infantil Zone	—N/a
Nickelodeon Adventure Lakeside	Nickelodeon Adventure	February 2020	—N/a	—N/a	—N/a
Nickelodeon Adventure Madrid	Nickelodeon Adventure	December 2018	September 2019	—N/a	—N/a
Nickelodeon Adventure Murcia	Nickelodeon Adventure	December 2017	March 2023	—N/a	—N/a
Sea World	Nickelodeon Land	December 2011	—N/a	Beach Break Bay	—N/a
Sega World Sydney	Nickelodeon TV Machine	April 1997	2000	—N/a	—N/a
Universal Studios Florida	Nickelodeon Studios	7 June 1990	30 April 2005	—N/a	Blue Man Group Theatre
Universal Studios Hollywood	Nickelodeon Blast Zone	April 2001	7 January 2008	—N/a	The Adventures of Curious George
WhiteWater World	Nickelodeon Pipeline Plunge	8 December 2006	24 June 2011	—N/a	Pipeline Plunge
Sunway Lagoon	Nickelodeon Lost Lagoon	3 February 2016	2023	Extreme Park	Lost Lagoon

== Attractions ==
Below is a list of all of the attractions at Nickelodeon themed areas around the world. The dates shown in the columns refer to the opening and closing dates for the ride under that name. It does not mean that the ride was closed and/or removed.

Attraction	Type	CGA	CW	C	DW	KD	KI	MOA	MPG	PBB	ADM	TLOL	Standalone
Angry Beavers Spooty Spin	Matterhorn				2002-2011								
Avatar Airbender	Disk'O						2006–2009			2011-			
Avatar Airbender	Half Pipe roller coaster							2008-					
Avatar Air Glider	Giant Skychaser								2007-				
Back at the Barnyard Hayride	Powered roller coaster							2008-					
Backyardigans' Hip Hopper	Hopper								2007-				
Backyardigans' Mission to Mars	Junior Roller Coaster								2007-				
Backyardigans' Pirate Treasure	Swinging Ship									2011-			
Backyardigans' Swing-Along	Swinger			2005-2009			2006–2009	2008-					
Backyardigans Mighty Go Round	Carousel				2008-2011								
Back at the Barnyard Bumpers	Bumper cars								2007-				
Balloon Race	Balloon Ride							2008-2015					
Big Rigs								2008-					
Bikini Bottom Bus Tour	Crazy Bus									2011-			
Blue Flyer	Junior Roller Coaster									2011-			
Blue's Skidoo	Rotating Flat Ride				2003-2011		2006–2009	2008-	2007-2018		2019		
Boots Balloon Race	Balloon Ride			2005-2009									
BrainSurge	UniCoaster							2010-					
Bubble Guppies Guppy Bubbler	Spinning Tower Ride							2015-					
Cap’n Turbot's Sea Patrol												2025-	
Carousel	Carousel							2008-					
Crazy Cars	Bumper cars							2008-					
Danny Phantom Flyers	Kite Flyer						2006–2007						
Danny Phantom Ghost Zone	Teacups								2007-				
Danny Phantom Ghost Zone	Falling Star							2008-2015					
Diego's Rainforest Rescue	Balloon Ride									2011-			
Diego's Rescue Rider	Rotating Flat Ride								2007-				
Diego's Rescue Rider	Crazy Bus							2008-					
Dora's Adventure Express	Children's Train								2007-				
Dora's Big River Adventure	Log Flume								2007-				
Dora's Dune Buggies	Rotating Flat Ride	2003-2009	2003-2009										
Dora's Sky Railway	Monorail										2019		
Dora's World Voyage	Boat Ride									2011-			
Dora and Boots Sun Wheel	Ferris Wheel							2008-					
Dora the Explorer Azul's Adventure	Children's Train			2005-2009									
Dora the Explorer Sea Planes	Rotating Flat Ride				2002-2010								
Fairly Odd Coaster	Family Wooden Roller Coaster			2005-2009			2006-2009						
Fairly Odd Coaster	Spinning roller coaster							2008-????					
Fairy World Spin	Mack teacups								2013-				
Fairy World Taxi Spin	Rotating Flat Ride									2011-			
Flying Dutchman's Revenge	Rockin' Tug			2005-2009									
Ghost Blasters	Dark ride							2008-					
Ghost Chasers	Wild Mouse								2007-				
Go Diego Go	Jeep Ride						2006–2009						
Ice Age Adventure	Flume ride								2005-2016				
Jimmy Neutron's Atom Smasher	Bumper cars						2006–2009						
Jimmy Neutron's Atomic Collider	Rotating Flat Ride							2008-					
Jimmy Neutron's Atomic Flyer	Suspended Family Coaster								2007-				
Jimmy Neutron's Brainwasher			2003-2009										
Jimmy Neutron's Nicktoon Blast	Motion simulator												2003-2011 (USF)
Krusty Krab Order Up	Hopper									2011-			
La Adventura de Azul	Children's Train						2006–2009	2008-					
LazyTown Sportacopters	Pedal Helicopters			2005-2009			2006–2009						
Little Bill's Cruisers	Mini Speed Boat Ride			2005-2009									
Little Bill's Giggle Coaster	Junior Roller Coaster						2006-2009						
Log Chute	Log flume							2008-					
Marshall's Fire Patrol												2025-	
Mystery River	Raft ride								2005-2017				
Nick Jr. Drivers	Car Ride						2006–2009						
Nick Jr. Jets	Flying Jet Ride			2005-2009									
Nick O Round	Carousel			2005-2009	2002-2008		2006–2009						
Nickelodeon Blast Zone	Children's play area												2001-2007 (USH)
Nickelodeon Pipeline Plunge	Aqua play area												2006-2011 (WWW)
Nickelodeon Slime Streak	Steel roller coaster										2019-		
Nickelodeon Space Surfer	Swinger					2000–2009							
Nickelodeon Streak	Wooden roller coaster									2011-			
Nickelodeon Studios	Production studio and game show												1990-2005 (USF)
Pepsi Orange Streak	Steel roller coaster							2008-					
Danny Phantom's Phantom Flyers	Kite Flyer			2005-2009			2006–2009						
PAW Patrol to The Rescue												2025-	
Paw Patrol Show and Meet & Greet												2025-	
Pineapple Poppers	Jumping Castle							2008-					
Plankton's Plunge	Hopper						2006–2009					2025-	
Rocket Power Air Time	Swinging Ride			2003-2009									
Rocket Power Bumper Beach	Bumper cars				2002-2011								
Rugrat Reptarmobiles	Bumper cars							2008-					
Rugrats Lost River	Log flume									2011-			
Rugrats Runaway Reptar Roller Coaster	Suspended Family Coaster	2003-2009		2003-2009	2002-2011		2001-2009						
Rugrats Toonpike			2003–2009			2000–2009							
Sandy's Power Plant												2025-	
Sandy's Rocket Ride												2025-	
Sandy's Blasting Bronco	Steel launched roller coaster										2020-		
Sea Swing	Swinger								2007-				
Skye's Flyers												2025-	
Snailways Express												2025-	
Splat-O-Sphere	Aviator								2007-				
Splat-O-Sphere	Space shot							2008-					
SpongeBob and Friends												2025-	
SpongeBob's Boatmobiles		2003-2009											
SpongeBob's Crazy Carnival Ride	Darkride Shooter											2025-	2024
SpongeBob FlyPants	Kite Flyer				2008-2011								
SpongeBob's Jellyfish Jam	Swing ride										2019-	2025-	
SpongeBob SquarePants Rock Bottom Plunge	Euro-Fighter roller coaster							2008-					
SpongeBob SquarePants Splash Bash	Splash Battle/Twist 'n' Splash								2007-	2011-			
Swinger Zinger	Swinger				2002-2011								
Swiper's Sweeper	Speedway						2006–2009	2008-	2007-				
Tak Attack								2008-2011					
Team Umizoomi Number Tumbler	Zamperla Kiddie carpet								2013-				
Teenage Robot Roundabout	Zamperla Kiddie carpet								2007-2012				
Teenage Mutant Ninja Turtles Shell Shock								2012-					
The Flying Dutchman's Ghost Ship												2025-	
Timmy's Airtours	Giant Skychaser						2006–2009						
Tommy's Take Off	Rotating Plane Ride			2005-2009									
Totally Nickelodeon													1997-2000 (USH)
Traffic Trouble												2025-	
TV Road Trip	Car Ride			2005-2009									
Wild Thornberry's Rainforest Rampage	Ball play area				2002-2011								
Wild Thornberry's Rain Maze	Water play area	2003-2009											
Wild Thornberry's River Adventure	Water ride			2003–2008			2001–2009						
Wild Thornberry's Treetop Lookout		2003-2009	2003-2009										
Wonder Pets Big Circus Bounce	Miniature Carousel									2011-			
Wonder Pets Fly Boat	Hopper							2008-					
Zuma's Zoomers												2025-	

== Shows and Events ==
Some Nickelodeon shows and events held in different theme parks around the world recently.

Name	Typology	Park	Year
Let's Party	Live Show	Mirabilandia	2022
Let's Party	Live Show	Bobbejaanland	2022
Let's Party	Live Show	Movie Park Germany	?
Let's Party	Live Show	Parque de Atracciones Madrid	?
SlimeFest	Live Concert	Mirabilandia	2018-2019
Nickelodeon Meet and Greet	Meet & Greet	Mirabilandia	2022
Nickelodeon Meet and Greet	Meet & Greet	Bobbejaanland	2022
Nickelodeon Meet and Greet	Meet & Greet	Movie Park Germany	2007
Nickelodeon Meet and Greet	Meet & Greet	Parque de Atracciones Madrid	2014
Nickelodeon Meet and Greet	Meet & Greet	Nickelodeon Universe	?
Nickelodeon Meet and Greet	Meet & Greet	Mirabilandia	2022
Street Parade	Parade	Mirabilandia	2022

== Character appearances ==
A variety of Nickelodeon costumed characters have been showcased at theme parks, parades, and other themed-entertainment experiences. Since the mid-2000s, a majority of the listed costumes have been designed and fabricated by Custom Characters Inc., a company that Nickelodeon Experience Design often collaborates with.

- Aaahh!!! Real Monsters: Krumm, Ickis
- The Adventures of Jimmy Neutron, Boy Genius: Jimmy Neutron
- Allegra's Window: Allegra
- The Angry Beavers: Norbert, Daggett
- Avatar: The Last Airbender: Aang
- Baby Shark's Big Show!: Baby Shark
- Back at the Barnyard: Otis
- The Backyardigans: Uniqua, Pablo, Tyrone
- Blue's Clues: Blue, Magenta, Periwinkle, Rainbow Puppy
- Bubble Guppies: Molly, Gil, Bubble Puppy
- Butterbean's Cafe: Butterbean, Cricket
- Danny Phantom: Danny Phantom
- Dora the Explorer: Dora, Diego, Jaguar, Boots
- Dora and Friends: Dora, Kate, Emma, Alana, Naiya, Pablo
- Doug: Doug, Porkchop
- Eureeka's Castle: Eureeka, Batty, Magellan
- The Fairly OddParents: Cosmo, Wanda, Foop
- Fanboy & Chum Chum: Fanboy, Chum Chum
- Garfield: Garfield, Odie
- Hey Arnold!: Arnold Shortman
- Jack's Big Music Show: Jack
- LazyTown: Sportacus, Stephanie
- Little Bill: Little Bill
- The Loud House: Lincoln Loud, Luan Loud, Ronnie Anne
- Nella the Princess Knight: Nella
- Ni Hao Kai-Lan: Kai-Lan
- Oswald: Oswald
- PAW Patrol: Chase, Marshall, Rubble, Skye, Rocky, Zuma, Everest
- The Ren & Stimpy Show: Ren, Stimpy
- Rise of the Teenage Mutant Ninja Turtles: Leonardo, Donatello, Raphael, Michelangelo
- Rocko's Modern Life: Rocko
- Rugrats: Tommy Pickles, Chuckie Finster, Angelica Pickles, Phil DeVille, Lil DeVille, Susie Carmichael, Lou Pickles
- Santiago of the Seas: Santiago
- Shimmer and Shine: Shimmer, Shine
- SpongeBob SquarePants: SpongeBob SquarePants, Patrick Star, Squidward Tentacles, Sandy Cheeks, Mr. Krabs, Pearl Krabs, Mrs. Puff
- Tak and the Power of Juju: Tak
- Team Umizoomi: Milli, Geo
- Teenage Mutant Ninja Turtles: Leonardo, Donatello, Raphael, Michelangelo, Foot Soldier, April O'Neil
- T.U.F.F. Puppy: Dudley Puppy
- The Wild Thornberrys: Eliza Thornberry, Donnie Thornberry
- Winx Club: Bloom, Stella, Aisha
- Wonder Pets!: Linny, Tuck, Ming Ming

== Gallery ==
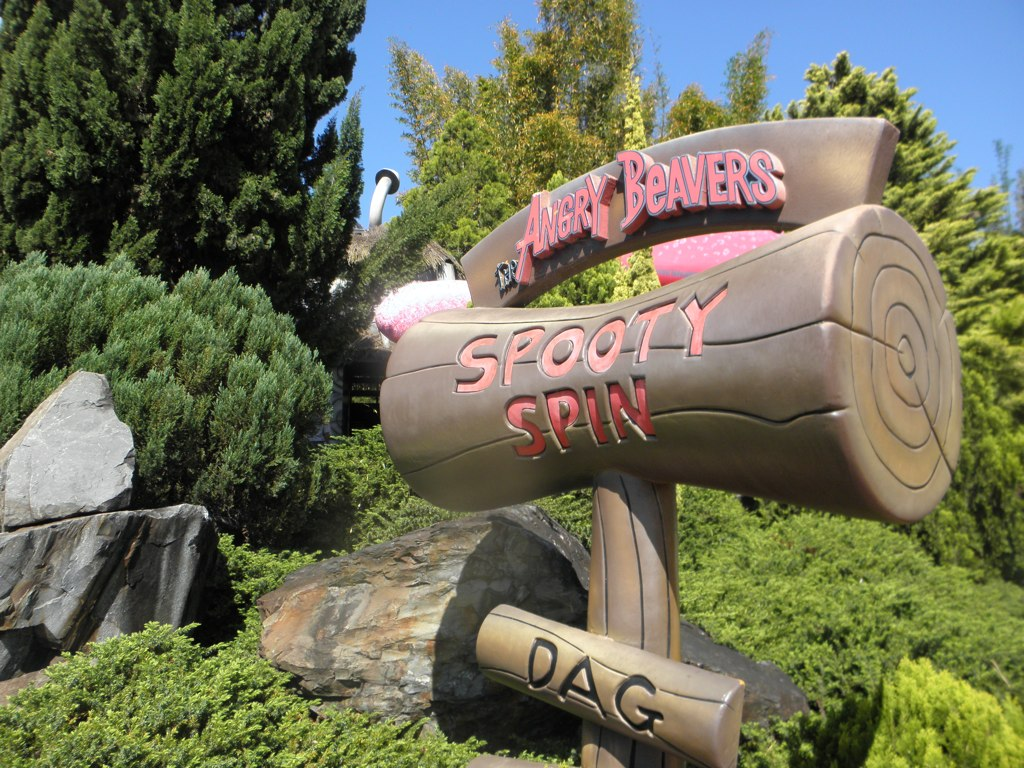
Angry Beavers Spooty Spin at Dreamworld

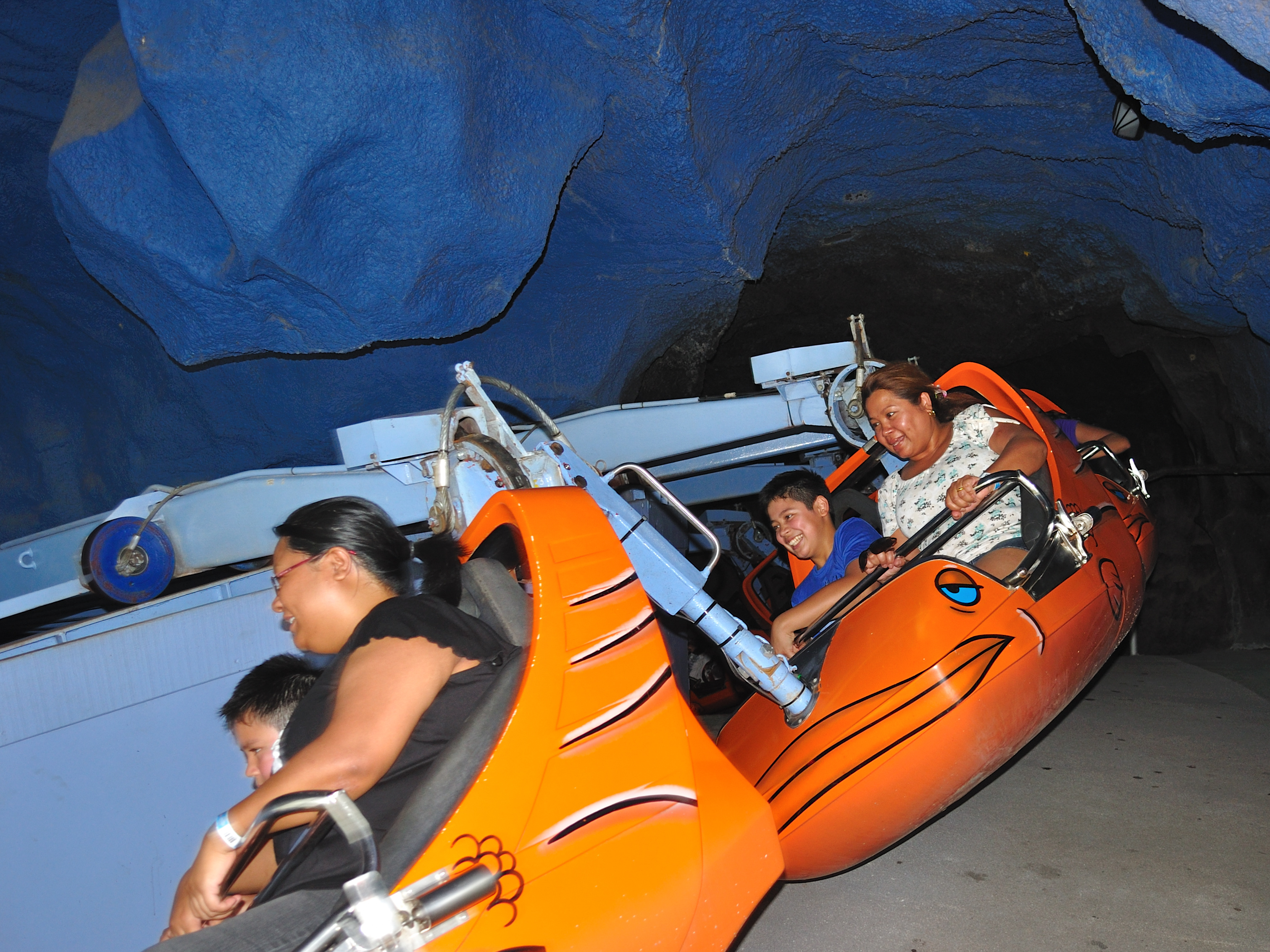
Angry Beavers Spooty Spin at Dreamworld

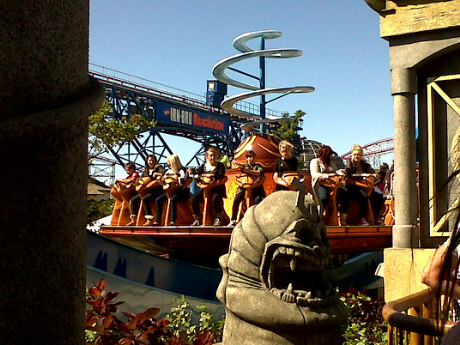
Avatar Airbender at Pleasure Beach Blackpool

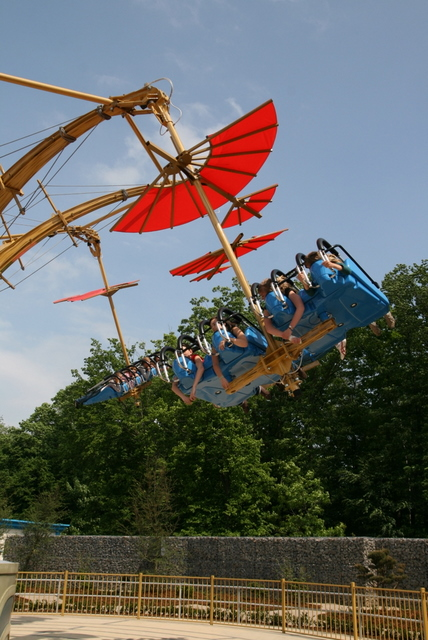
Avatar Air Glider at Movie Park Germany

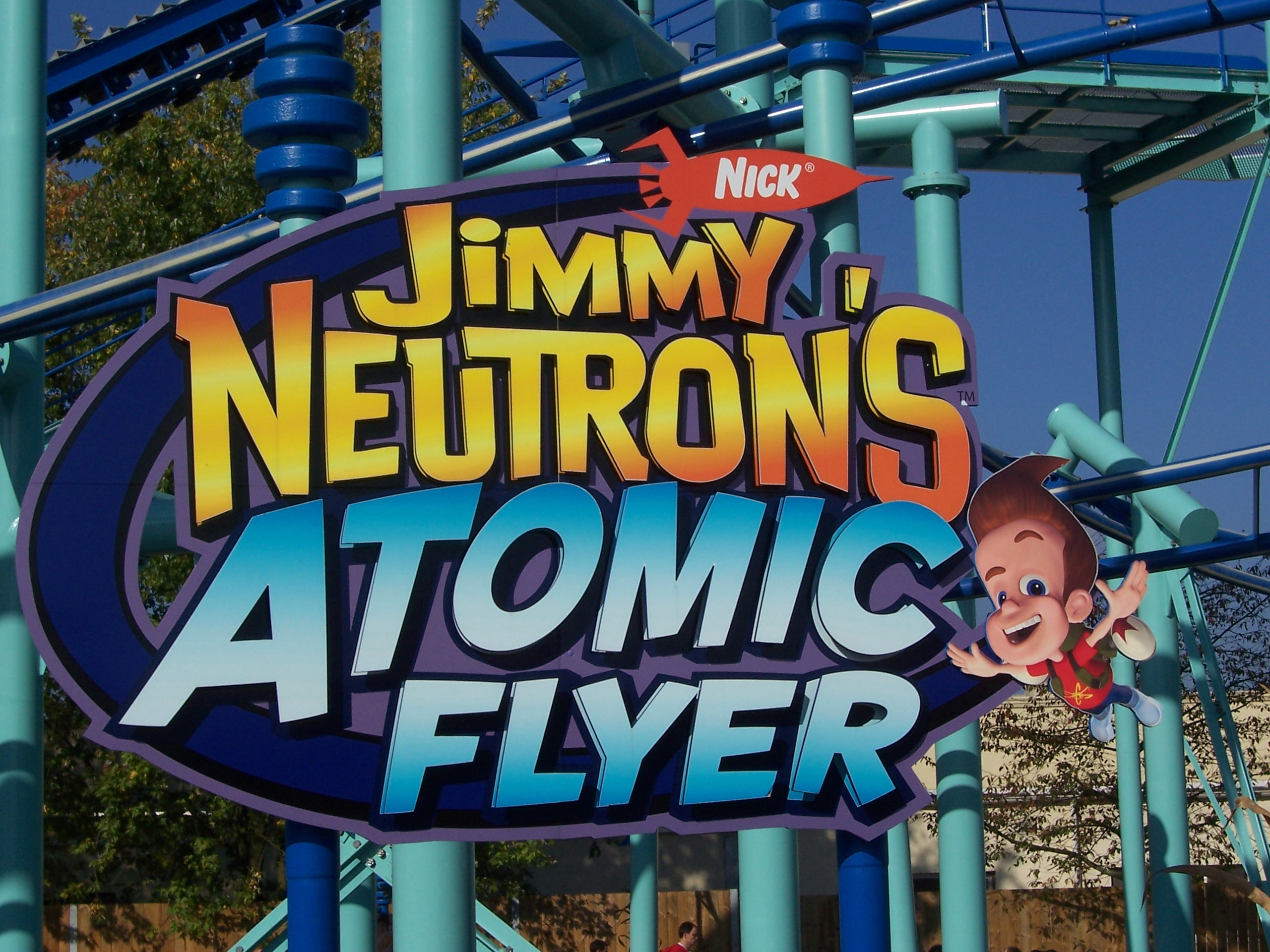
Jimmy Neutron's Atomic Flyer at Movie Park Germany

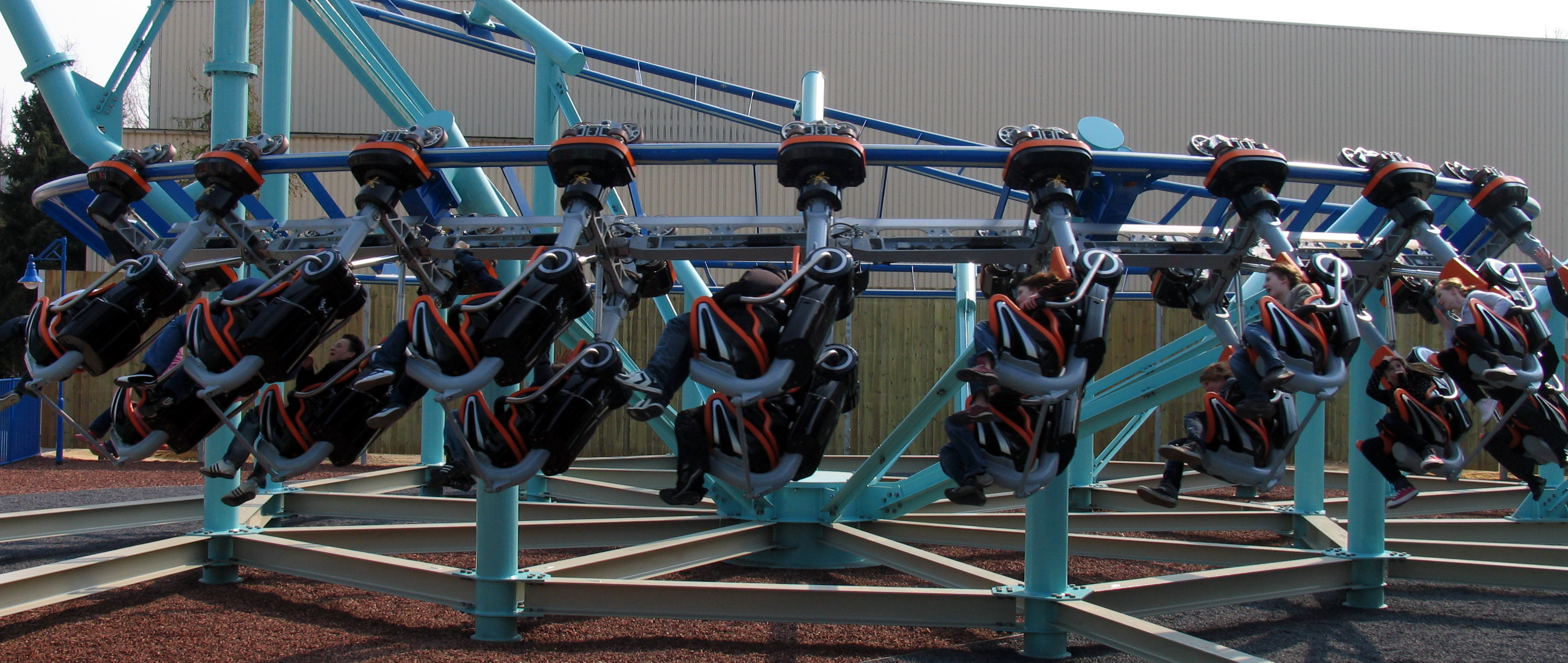
Jimmy Neutron's Atomic Flyer at Movie Park Germany

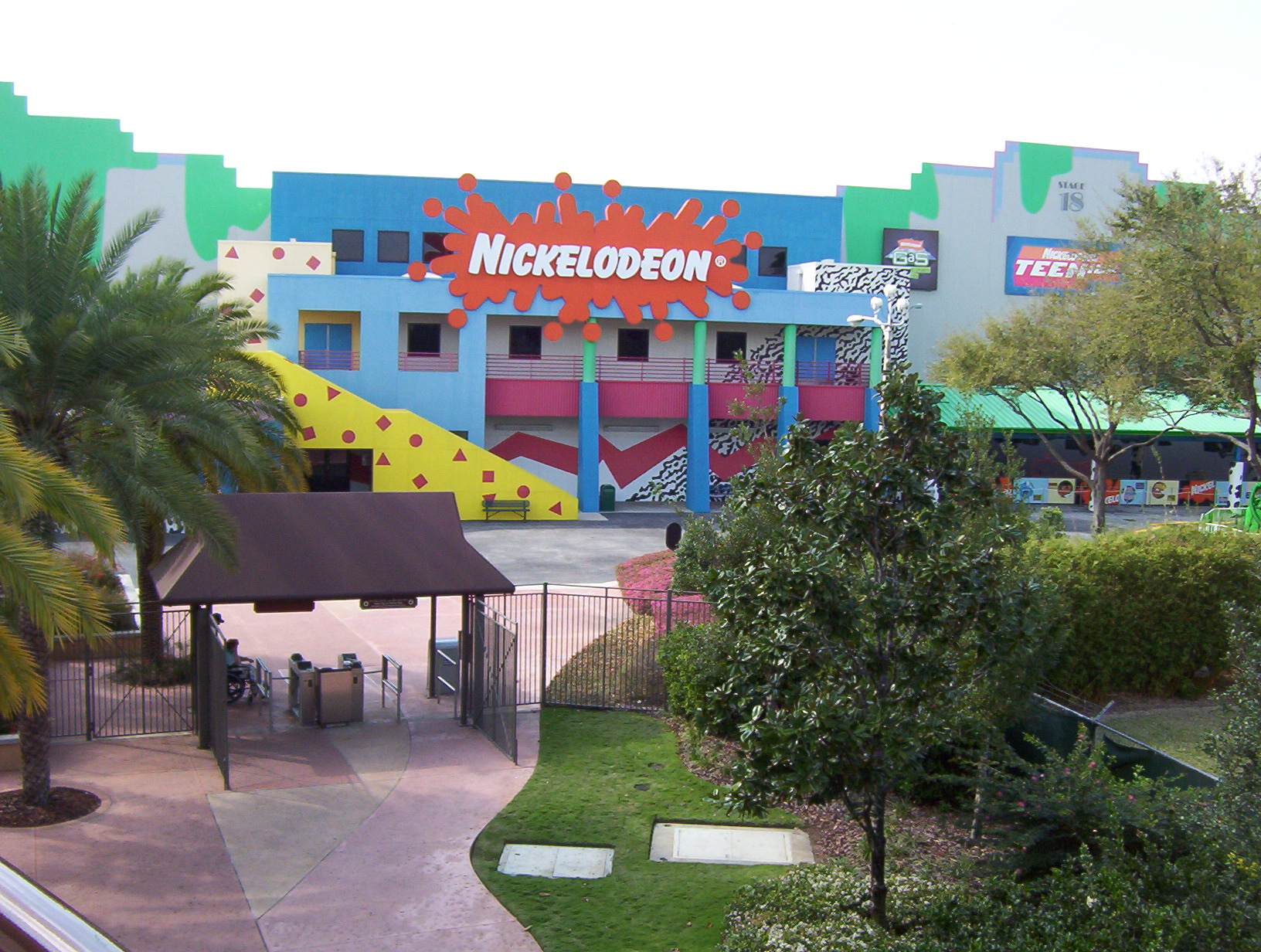
Nickelodeon Studios at Universal Studios Florida

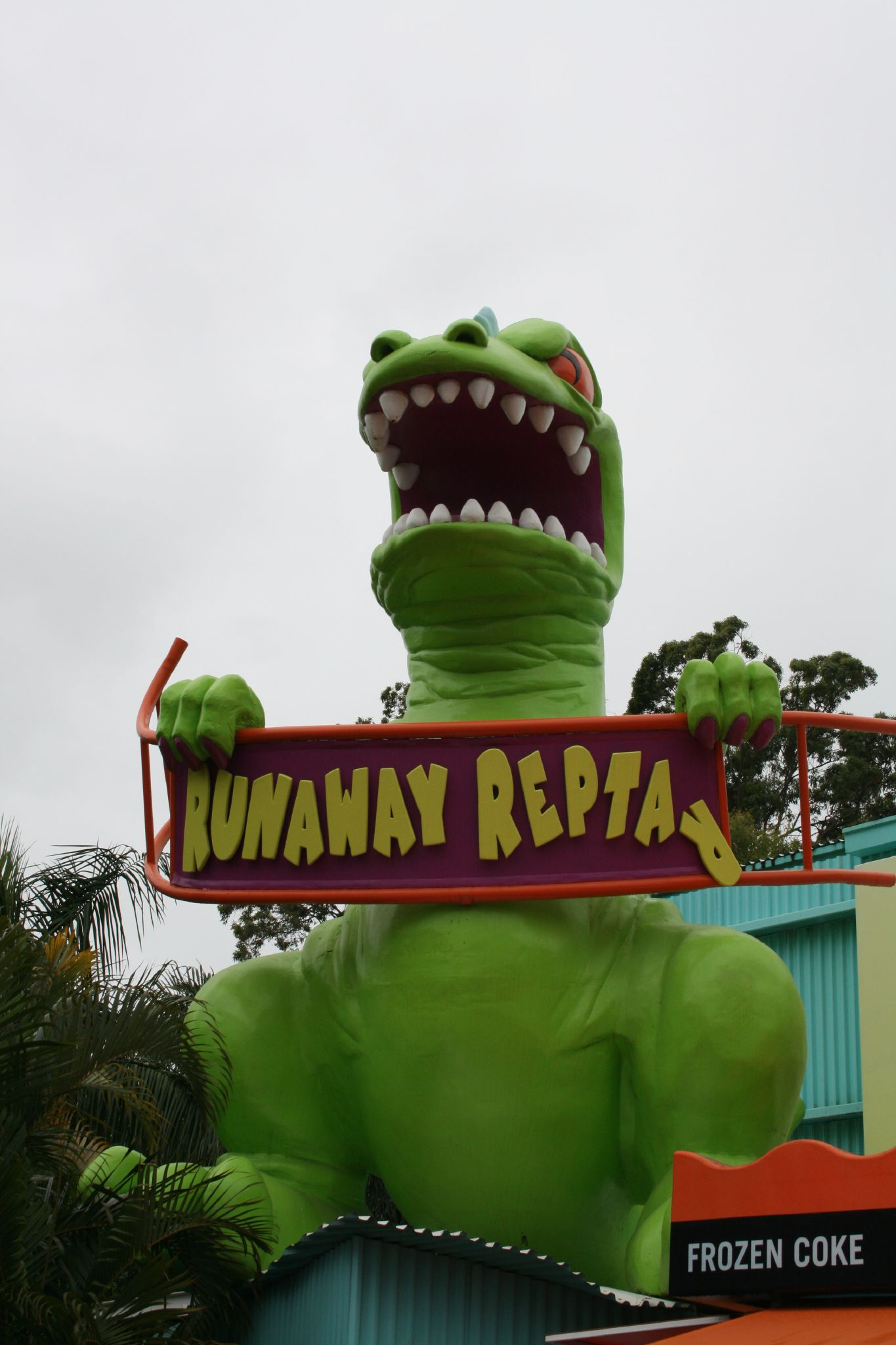
Rugrats Runaway Reptar at Dreamworld

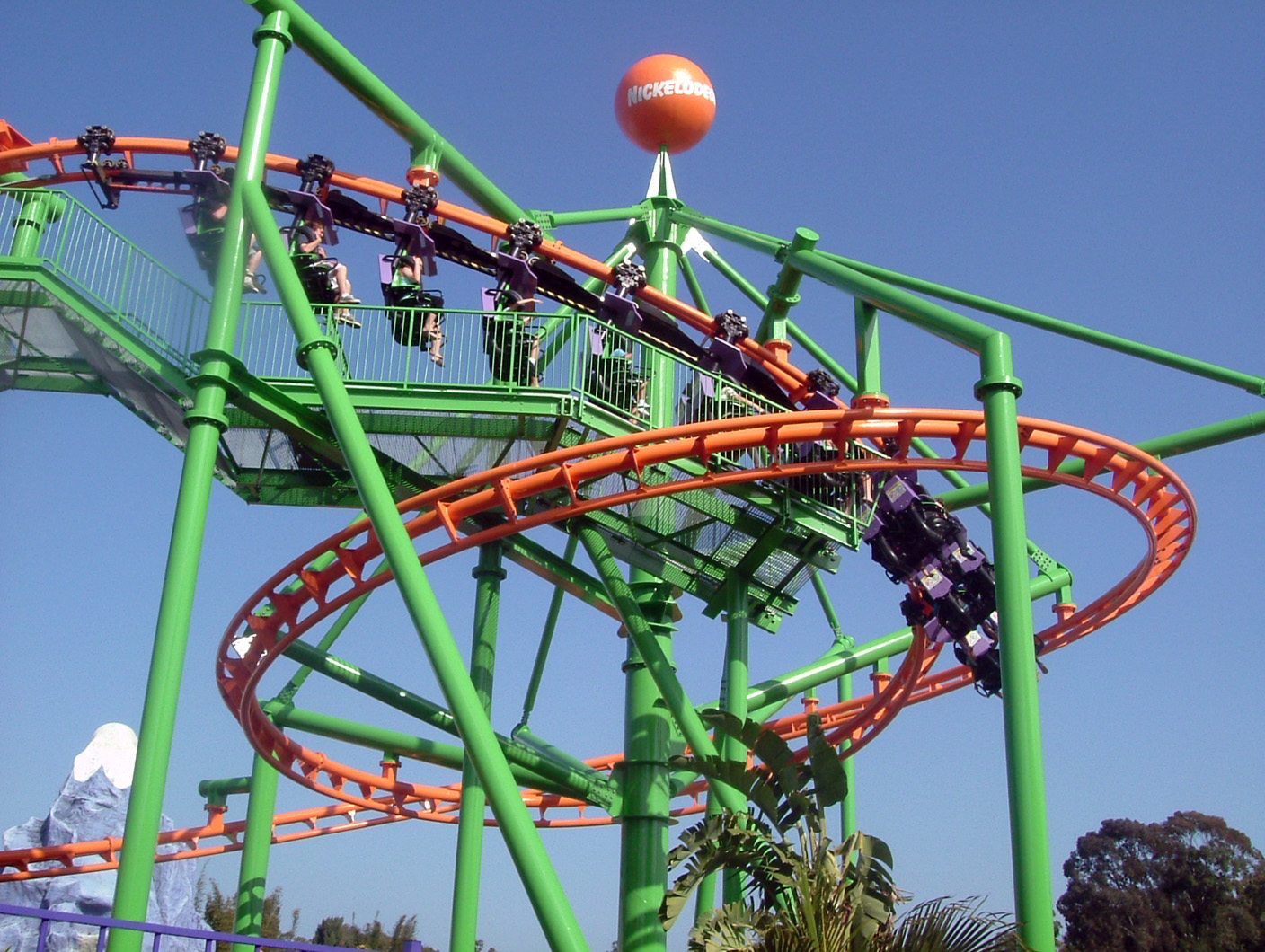
Rugrats Runaway Reptar at Dreamworld

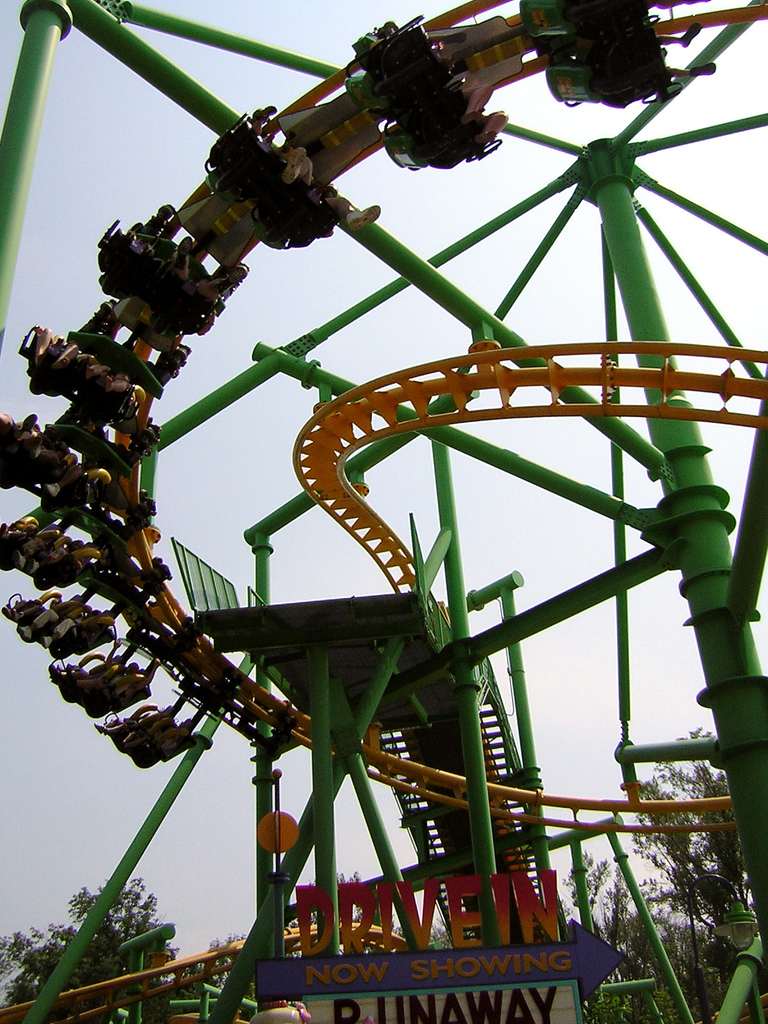
Rugrats Runaway Reptar at Kings Island

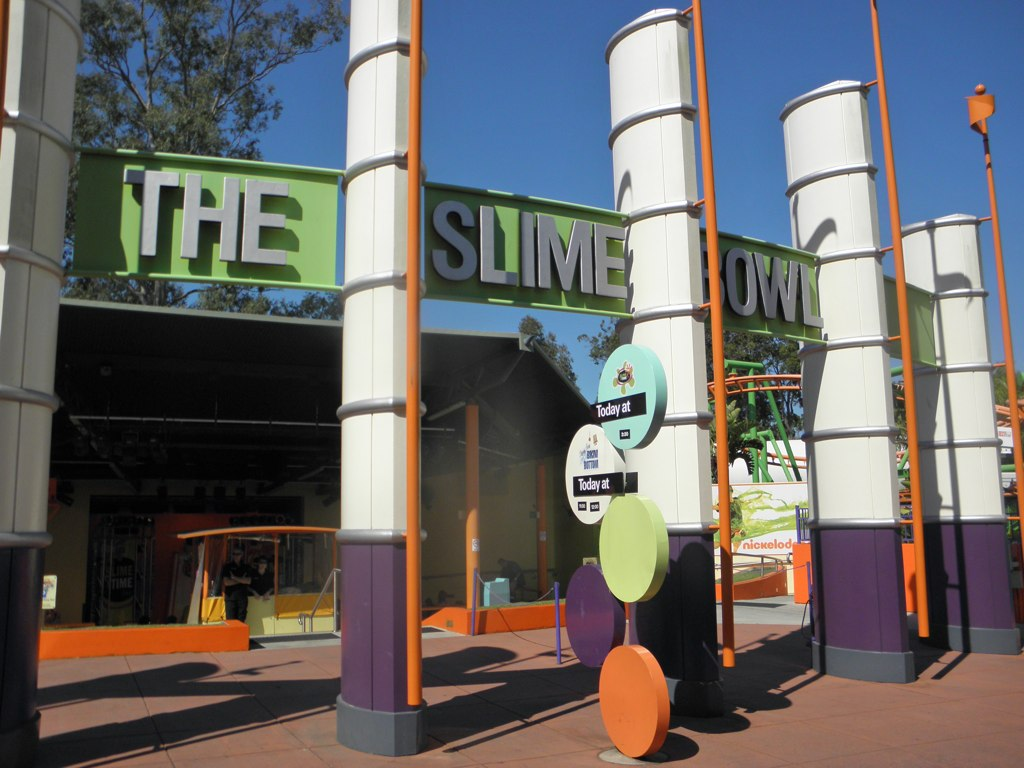
Slime Bowl at Dreamworld

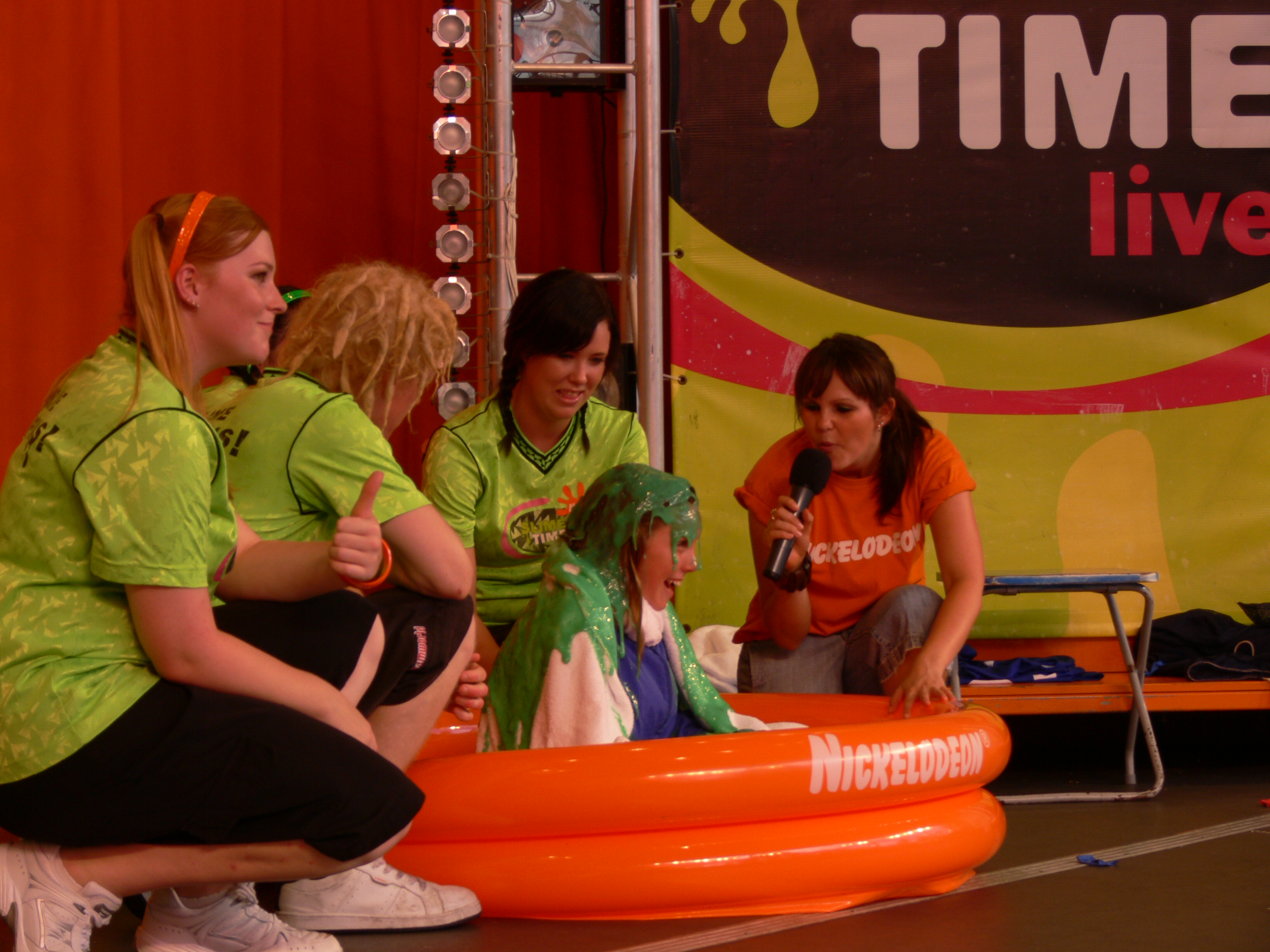
Slime Time Live at Dreamworld

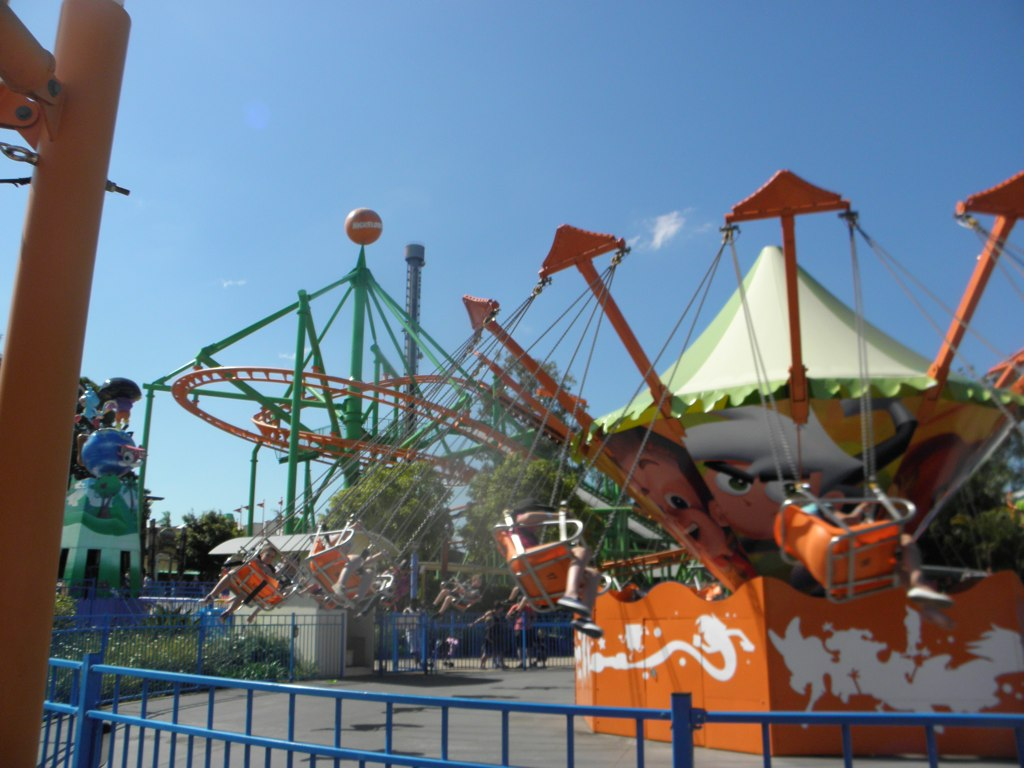
Swinger Zinger at Dreamworld

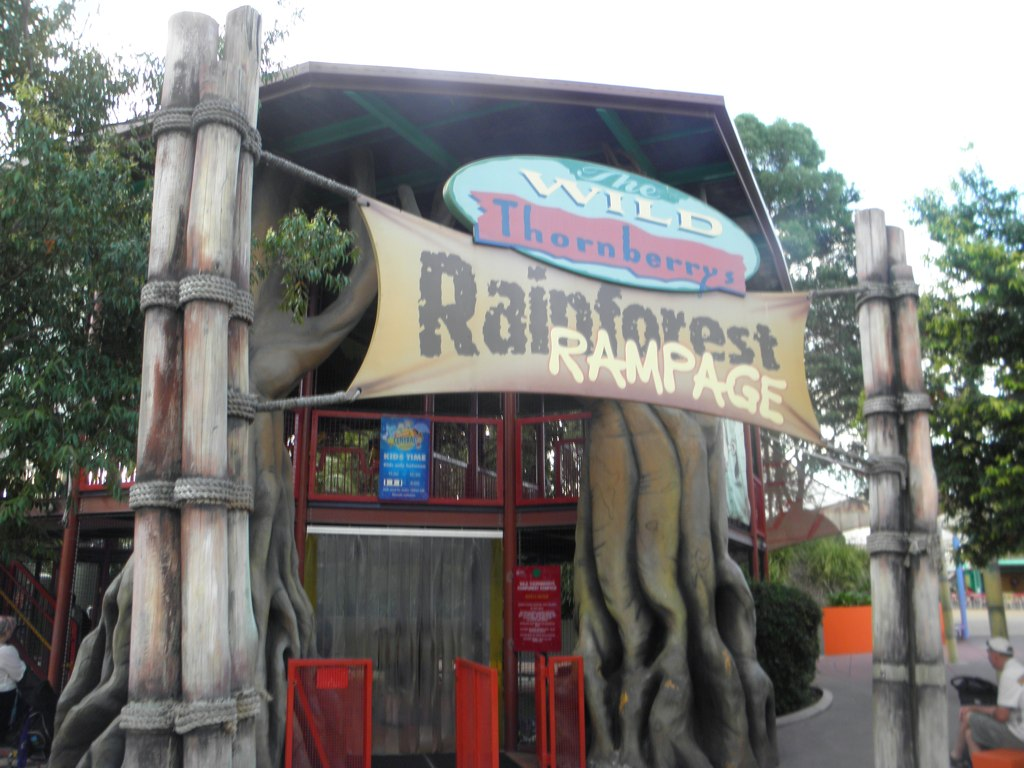
Wild Thornberrys Rainforest Rampage at Dreamworld

== See also ==
- Category:Nickelodeon in amusement parks
- Nickelodeon Splat City
