= Rugrats Runaway Reptar =

Rugrats Runaway Reptar was the name of several roller coasters which have since been renamed and rethemed. These include:

- Flying Ace Aerial Chase, a steel inverted roller coaster at Kings Island amusement park in Mason, Ohio and Carowinds amusement park in Charlotte, North Carolina
- Kenny's Forest Flyer, a steel inverted roller coaster at the Dreamworld theme park on the Gold Coast, Queensland, Australia

Runaway Reptar was the name of a roller coaster that has been renamed and themed,

- Woodstock's Express (California's Great America), a family roller coaster at California's Great America
