= Joe Cool's Dodgem School =

Joe Cool's Dodgem School is a dodgem ride for kids and is themed to the Cedar Fair kids area which is Planet Snoopy. It is located at three parks:

- Joe Cool's Dodgem School at Kings Island
- Joe Cool's Dodgem School at Canada's Wonderland
- Joe Cool's Dodgem School at Cedar Point
