= Woodstock's Air Rail =

Roller coaster designed by Vekoma

Woodstock’s Air Rail
- Previously known as Rugrats Runaway Reptar (2001–2009), Flying Ace Aerial Chase (2010-2023)
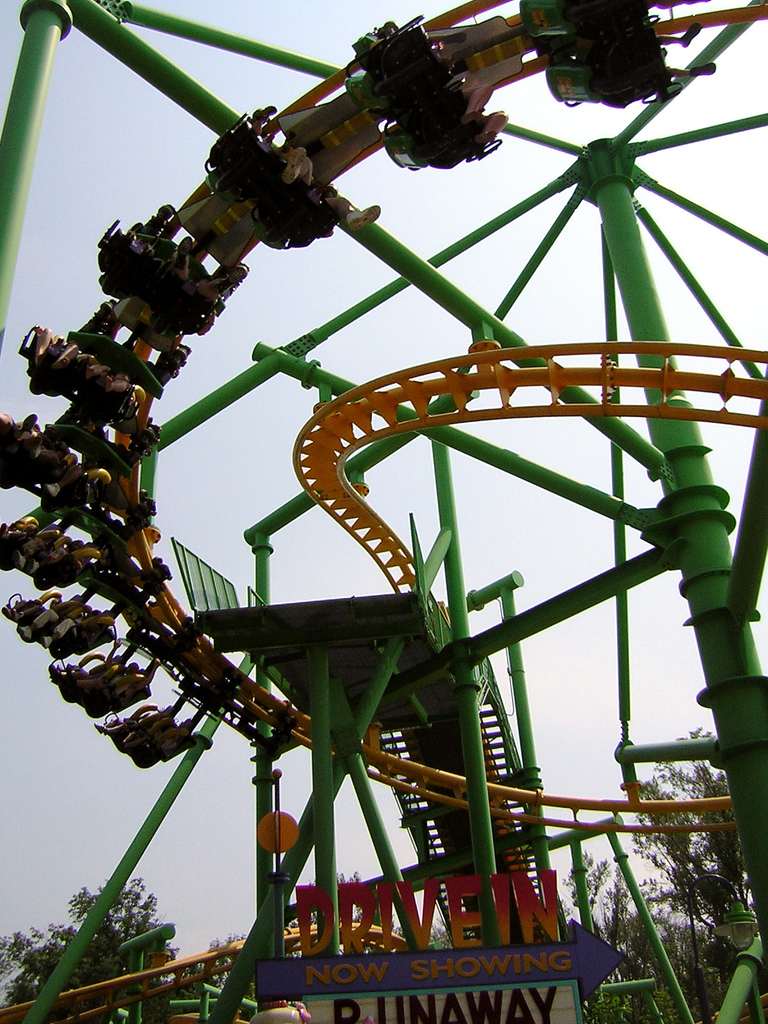
- Rugrats Runaway Reptar at Kings Island (2005)

Kings Island
- Park section: Camp Snoopy
- Coordinates: 39.341773°N 84.269114°W
- Status: Operating
- Opening date: April 7, 2001

Carowinds
- Name: Kiddy Hawk
- Park section: Thunder Road
- Coordinates: 35.102070°N 80.940689°W
- Status: Operating
- Opening date: March 22, 2003
- Website: Official website
- Former names: Rugrats Runaway Reptar (2003–2009); Flying Ace Aerial Chase (2010–2017)
- Kiddy Hawk at Carowinds at RCDB

General statistics
- Type: Steel – Family – Inverted
- Manufacturer: Vekoma
- Designer: Peter Clerx
- Model: Suspended Family Coaster 342m
- Lift/launch system: Booster wheel lift hill
- Height: 48.6 ft (14.8 m)
- Length: 1,122 ft (342 m)
- Speed: 26 mph (42 km/h)
- Inversions: 0
- Duration: 1:30
- Capacity: 650 riders per hour
- G-force: 2.2
- Trains: Single train with 10 cars; riders arranged 2 across in a single row for a total of 20 riders per train
- Website: Official website
- Fast Lane available at Kings Island
- Woodstock’s Air Rail at RCDB

Woodstock’s Air Rail is an inverted roller coaster located at Kings Island in Mason, Ohio, and at Carowinds in Charlotte, North Carolina. Manufactured by Vekoma, the Suspended Family Coaster model debuted at Kings Island in 2001 and was followed by another identical installation at Carowinds in 2003. Both rides originally opened as Rugrats Runaway Reptar, themed to the Nickelodeon animated television series Rugrats and its two-part episode "Runaway Reptar". Following Cedar Fair's acquisition of both parks in 2006, the roller coasters were eventually renamed Flying Ace Aerial Chase for the 2010 season, themed after the 1960s comic strip series Snoopy vs. the Red Baron by Peanuts creator Charles Schulz. The Carowinds installation was renamed again to Kiddy Hawk for the 2018 season. The Kings Island installation was renamed again to Woodstock’s Air Rail for the 2024 season.

== History ==
=== Kings Island ===
Woodstock’s Air Rail opened to the public on April 7, 2001 as Rugrats Runaway Reptar. This was Kings Island's fourth kids' coaster earning the park the title: "Kid's Coaster Capital of the World!". That same year, the Kings Mills Log Flume was refurbished and rethemed to Nickelodeon and was named The Wild Thornberry's River Adventure. Those two new rides formed a new area called Nickelodeon Central. This area was separate from the regular Hanna-Barbera children's area, but it was still a kids' area. It was not until 2006 that the rest of the Hanna-Barbera land was transformed into one kids' area, called Nickelodeon Universe. This change did not affect the two already existing rides in Nickelodeon Central, since they already had the Nickelodeon theme. In 2010, Nickelodeon Universe became Planet Snoopy, and changed the ride's name to Flying Ace Aerial Chase to fit the Snoopy theme. The support beams of the ride were repainted from green to orange. In 2024, to fit in with the theme of Camp Snoopy, the ride was renamed Woodstock’s Air Rail and the track was repainted green and the supports repainted brown.

=== Carowinds ===
When Rugrats Runaway Reptar became so immensely popular at Paramount's Kings Island, the then-owners, Paramount, decided to build a copy of the ride at Carowinds. Rugrats Runaway Reptar opened in 2003 at Paramount's Carowinds as a direct clone as the one found at Kings Island, the only difference being the color of the shoulder restraints. From 2010 through 2017, the ride was named Flying Ace Aerial Chase. For the 2018 transition from Planet Snoopy to Camp Snoopy, the name was changed to Kiddy Hawk, and was re-painted light blue and tan. It was also moved out of the kids' area and into Thunder Road. In 2025, the ride had an electrical fire.

== Ride layout ==
As the train comes out of the station, it makes a 90 degree turn to the right and starts up the tire drive lift hill. As the train exits the lift hill, it is sent on a double helix to the left. From there, the train makes its way under the lift hill and over to the top of the station, making the riders feel as if they could touch it with their feet. Then it turns right and travels alongside of the lift hill and then turns right 180 degrees. At this point the train is very close to the ground. Then, it turns 180 degrees to the left into the activating brakes.
