= Runaway Reptar =

- Rugrats episodes
- Episode nos.: Season 6 Episodes 24 and 25
- Directed by: John Holmquist; Jim Duffy
- Written by: Ali Marie Matheson; Jon Cooksey; Scott Gray (idea)
- Production codes: 110; 111; (995)
- Original air dates: August 3, 1999 (VHS); November 27, 1999 (TV)

Episode chronology
| ← Previous "Doctor Susie" | Next → "Accidents Happen" |

"Runaway Reptar" is a TV movie initially released as the 24th and 25th episodes of the sixth season of the animated television series Rugrats, and the 118th and 119th episodes of the series overall. It originally aired on the television network Nickelodeon on November 27, 1999, and the plot follows the babies watching a Reptar movie and imagining themselves as part of the story. It was directed by John Holmquist and Jim Duffy, and was the first two-part episode in the series.

== Plot summary ==
=== Part 1 ===
Lou Pickles brings Tommy, Dil, Chuckie, Lil, Phil, and Angelica to a drive-in movie theater, which the babies refer to as a "parking lot movie". Susie and her two older brothers are also at the drive-in, with Susie talking to Angelica via a pair of walkie-talkies. The babies watch the film Runaway Reptar; it begins with a giant pterosaur named Dactar terrorizing Japan. When Reptar, instead of fighting Dactar, helps him to destroy the city, Tommy suggests they should go to "Pokyo" and figure out what's wrong with their hero. Tommy summons his flying "Super Secret Reptar Car"; he, Phil, Lil, and Dil, joined at the last minute by a reluctant Chuckie, climb in and fly into the movie universe through the screen.

The town is mostly deserted, due to people fleeing the two monsters' rampage, and the babies soon find that Dactar is pursuing them. As Dactar tries to peck at them, they go through a tunnel so Dactar will get stuck. They see Reptar destroying a fire truck; convinced Reptar is too bad to redeem, Chuckie suggests a snail should be the new hero. He finds one, but Dil throws it away. Inspired by a remark from some news reporters, Tommy, Phil and Lil set a trap for Reptar with some dinosaur treats as bait; however, Reptar walks up behind them. Chuckie sees this and asks advice from a slug; receiving none, he hurries to push Tommy out of Reptar's way, falling into the pile of treats.

=== Part 2 ===
Reptar ignores the treats, and Tommy saves Chuckie from the pile. The Rugrats then discover that this Reptar is merely a robot replica, controlled by Angelica, who wishes to use it to force her parents to get her more toys. The man who gave her the idea appears on a blimp, and explains his plan for world domination. Angelica sends the Robot Reptar towards the babies' houses, so Tommy and the gang call Susie to tell her what's going on. The Rugrats head to Mount Fugelica to stop Angelica, but Dactar is behind them again; eating their way through the yam "lava" coming out of the mountain's top, they fly through the entrance to Angelica's lair, which is too small for Dactar to follow.

Susie and her brothers confront the robot Reptar in their Halloween costumes, and stop him from crushing Tommy's house. Meanwhile, Angelica, who has already imprisoned the real Reptar in a giant snow globe, captures the babies. While Tommy tries to break open their prison, Dil finds and pulls on a joystick Tommy calls "the tinkly thing"; this causes suction darts to shoot out of the Reptar car, breaking Angelica's controls for the robot Reptar. The robot Reptar returns to Mount Fugelica, dragging Susie and her brothers with it. It chases Angelica, and Tommy gets her to let them out so they can help her.

Susie hides Angelica in a pile of cookies. The robot Reptar damages the car and leaves with Dil, so Tommy frees the real Reptar with his screwdriver while Susie's brother Edwin repairs the car. Reptar then helps the babies by fighting his robot counterpart, aided by Dactar. While they fight, Tommy rescues Dil; the kids thank Reptar and return to the real world. Dactar and Reptar chase the robot into the sea. As the families go home from the drive-in, Tommy uses Angelica's walkie-talkie to thank Susie for helping. The kids doze off in the car; as Angelica falls asleep, she drops a toy snow globe, and a miniature Reptar appears inside it.

== Cast ==
- E.G. Daily as Tommy Pickles
- Christine Cavanaugh as Chuckie Finster
- Kath Soucie as Phil and Lil DeVille
- Tara Strong as Dil Pickles/Mariko (credited as Tara Charendoff)
- Cheryl Chase as Angelica Pickles
- Cree Summer as Susie Carmichael/Edwin Carmichael
- Joe Alaskey as Grandpa Lou Pickles/Announcer
- David Eccles as Reptar/Robot Reptar/Dactar
- Michael Donovan as Evil Scientist/Jim Hashimato
- Jess Harnell as Jingle Singer
- Freda Foh Shen as Pam
- Gedde Watanabe as Zack
- Joey Wilcots as Buster Carmichael
- Michael Keenan as The Professor

== Production ==
"Runaway Reptar" was inspired by an idea from Scott Gray. It was written by Ali Marie Matheson and Jon Cooksey, and directed by John Holmquist and Jim Duffy. It was presented as the eighteenth and nineteenth episodes of the sixth season of Rugrats, which was created by Arlene Klasky and Gábor Csupó, along with Paul Germain, founders of the self-titled company Klasky Csupo.

== Release ==
"Runaway Reptar" originally aired on Nickelodeon on Saturday, November 27, 1999, and was given a TV-Y parental guidance rating. The episode was viewed in 2.17 million households when it first aired. The episode became available on VHS on August 3, 1999 and on an Amazon-exclusive DVD set on October 6, 2011. The title is currently available for streaming on the Paramount+ service.

== Legacy ==
=== Book ===
"Runaway Reptar!" was adapted into a children's picture book by Cecile Schorbele. The book was published by Simon Spotlight on June 1, 1999, and is currently out of print.

=== Roller coasters ===
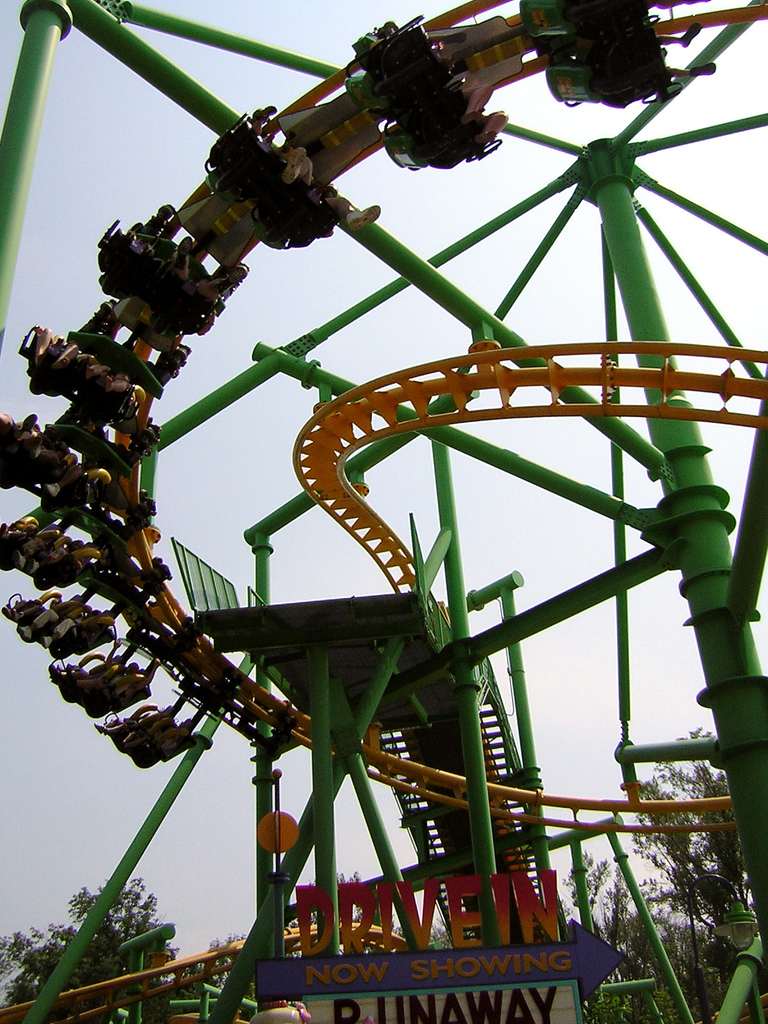
Rugrats Runaway Reptar at Kings Island

"Rugrats Runaway Reptar" was the name given to a trio of Suspended Family Coasters designed by Peter Clerx for the Vekoma company. The first of the three coasters debuted in 2001 at Kings Island, and the years 2002 and 2003 saw its counterparts open at Dreamworld and Carowinds, respectively. Also in 2003, the Green Slime Mine Car coaster at California's Great America was renamed "Runaway Reptar" and rethemed in honor of the episode; however, this ride, designed in 1987 by Intamin, is a small steel coaster with traditional sit-down cars. All four coasters have since been renamed and rethemed; as of 2025, all four are still operational.

| Name | Manufacturer | Amusement Park | Location | Opening Year | Theme Track Color | RCDB page |
|---|---|---|---|---|---|---|
| Rugrats Runaway Reptar | Vekoma Rides Manufacturing | Kings Island | Mason, Ohio, United States of America | 2001 | yellow track, green supports | |
| Rugrats Runaway Reptar | Vekoma Rides Manufacturing | Dreamworld | Gold Coast, Queensland, Australia | 2002 | orange track, green supports | |
| Rugrats Runaway Reptar | Vekoma Rides Manufacturing | Carowinds | Charlotte, North Carolina, United States of America | 2003 | yellow track, green supports | |
| Runaway Reptar | Intamin Amusement Rides | California's Great America | Santa Clara, California, United States of America | 1987 (theme 2003) | orange track and supports | |

== See also ==
- Reptar
- List of Rugrats episodes
- Klasky Csupo
