= Linus' Beetle Bugs =

Linus' Beetle Bugs is a kids' amusement ride with a Peanuts theme and may refer to:

- Linus' Beetle Bugs at Cedar Point
- Linus' Beetle Bugs at Kings Island
- Linus' Beetle Bugs at Valleyfair
- Linus' Beetle Bugs at Worlds of Fun
