= Hanna-Barbera in amusement parks =

Hanna-Barbera themed attractions

Through its history, Hanna-Barbera has operated theme park attractions, mostly as a section in Kings Island, Carowinds, California's Great America, Kings Dominion, Canada's Wonderland, and, recently, Six Flags Great America.

Outside North America, the theme parks were also available in several countries, notably in the United Kingdom, China, India, and Australia, which was part of Australia's Wonderland

== History of involvement in theme parks ==
Taft Broadcasting purchased Hanna-Barbera Productions, a television animation studio, in 1967. Two years later, it purchased Cincinnati's Coney Island amusement park, moving it and expanding it on a larger allotment of land, reopening it in 1972 as Kings Island. The company partnered with Top Value Enterprises to create Family Leisure Centers in 1973, opening Virginia's Kings Dominion in 1975; the company purchased Carowinds the same year. In 1979, Taft purchased 20% of the new Canada's Wonderland theme park in Toronto, Ontario, Canada, which opened in 1981. The year prior, Family Entertainment Centers was dissolved, making Taft the sole owner of Kings Dominion.

By 1984, a grouping of senior executives from Taft's Amusement Park Group and some park managers purchased Taft's theme park division. The group named the resulting company Kings Entertainment Company (KECO). Taft gave KECO a perpetual license to use Hanna-Barbera characters at all of their current parks. Australia's Wonderland, which opened in 1985, also licensed the characters, but 1989 KECO purchaser Great America did not opt to receive the license, or opt to separately license. In their first year of incorporation, KECO opened a short-lived Hanna-Barbera Land in Houston, Texas.

The Kings Entertainment Company theme parks all had Hanna-Barbera sections, some having The Flintstones sections, and Smurf sections, after the popularity of the 1980s television series The Smurfs. Through the years, these parks have largely removed or re-branded the areas into other children's sections (under the Nickelodeon brand and the Paramount Parks-created name "KidZVille"). Any of the still operating parks are part of Cedar Fair; Australia's Wonderland and the stand-alone Hanna-Barbera Land parks are both defunct.

=== Big hopes for motion-controlled attraction ===
In October 1989, animated film producer David Kirschner became Hanna-Barbera's president and CEO; Hanna-Barbera was part of the publicly traded Great American Broadcasting Company. He set out to make the company an entertainment conglomerate to rival Disney, by utilizing its existing core characters. Recognizing the Hanna-Barbera parks needed rejuvenation, he had the company create The Funtastic World of Hanna-Barbera, a motion simulation-ride.

Created to be one of Universal Studios Florida's original attractions, The Funtastic World of Hanna-Barbera cost between $13 and $14 million, and opened June 7, 1990. They also opened a concept store at the exit to the attraction, for a chain of Hanna-Barbera stores they hoped to open. The attraction operated for 12 years, until it was closed October 20, 2002, to make room for Jimmy Neutron's Nicktoon Blast (now Despicable Me Minion Mayhem)

== Hanna-Barbera Land ==
Hanna-Barbera Land was a theme park based on the cartoons of the Hanna-Barbera animation studio. It was located in Spring, Texas, United States, north of Houston. It was opened in the 1984 and 1985 seasons. The park was built under the purview of Taft Broadcasting, which became the Kings Entertainment Company as of the opening. Kings also owned the Australia's Wonderland, Canada's Wonderland, Carowinds, Kings Dominion, and Kings Island theme parks. Despite increased attendance in 1985, a bad regional economy and minimal spending in the park on concessions, gift shop purchases and souvenirs meant a death knell for the attraction.

Hanna-Barbera Land was sold to private investors and SplashTown USA was built in its place, then again to Bryant Morris, then to Six Flags, who purchased the park in 1999. After initially not wanting to brand the park and calling it "a member of the Six Flags family", Six Flags eventually decided to re-brand the park as Six Flags SplashTown. In 2007, the park was sold to PARC Management, which branded it as Wet 'N Wild SplashTown, until 2019, when it returned to Six Flags management as part of an operating agreement with PARC Management. Six Flags changed the name to Six Flags Hurricane Harbor SplashTown.

== As sections of larger parks ==
=== Canada's Wonderland ===
Hanna-Barbera Land opened in 1981 with three sections. The first section was Yogi's Woods, based on The Yogi Bear Show, which featured the attractions Balloon Race, Yogi's Cave, Boo Boo's Buggies and the Woodland Theatre (now the Playhouse Theatre). Scoobyville was the central town site, where a carousel and other attractions were included. On the opposite end of Scoobyville from Yogi's Woods was Bedrock, based on The Flintstones. Saltwater Circus was also in the section.

In 1984, Smurf Village replaced Yogi's Woods; the section featured the newly-popular Hanna-Barbera cartoon The Smurfs. A walk-through attraction, Smurf Village closed at the end of the 1992 season.

For the 1993 season, the Smurf Village section of the park became Kids Kingdom. In 1998, KidZVille replaced the Kids Kingdom and its two rides, the "Kid's Castle Playland" and the "Jumbo Bumps" were renamed "The Candy Factory" and the "Twizzler Twist" (and renamed again the next year to "Sour Cherry Blaster Twist"). Along with five new rides for KidZVille, "The Busy Little Town" was launched and it included the characters from Nickelodeon's Rugrats series. The Playhouse Theatre still had a Hanna-Barbera themed show, Scooby Doo's Scary School Daze. On slower days, the Scooby-Doo walkaround character may venture through this section of the park.

The Bedrock section of the park met its end soon after, being replaced by Nickelodeon Central in 2003. Only the bumper cars were kept, turned into the Rugrats Toonpike. The restaurant was de-themed and turned into a Pizza Pizza.

In 2010, Hanna-Barbera Land was replaced with Planet Snoopy.

=== Carowinds ===
Happy Land of Hanna-Barbera (1975-?)

In 1984, Carowinds added Smurf Island, which was a children's play area located on the 1.3-acre (5,300 m2) island surrounded by the Carolina Sternwheeler. Access to Smurf Island was gained in one of two ways – across the Carolina Sternwheeler and a ramp built on the island side of the boat, or on diesel-powered "Smurf Boats" launched from the area beside Harmony Hall. Children could enjoy two ball crawls and a climbing area complete with ropes, cargo nets, wood platforms, a rope tunnel and a 60-foot (18 m) tubular slide. Smurf characters roamed the island and led guests to the hidden Smurf village with four Smurf houses that children could enter. Smurf Island was eventually closed and later demolished to make space for the BORG Assimilator, a Star Trek-themed flying roller coaster. The Borg coaster is no longer operating today, but the theming was removed in 2008 and the name was changed to Nighthawk.

=== California's Great America ===
Opening in 1987, Smurf Woods featured a pint-sized steel coaster, the Blue Streak (now called Woodstock Express), as well as a Smurf village with mushroom houses. Smurf Woods was closed in 1995 and replaced with Nickelodeon Splat City. One Smurf house survived and can be seen in the Picnic Grove area. The area was renamed Planet Snoopy in 2010.

=== Six Flags Great America ===
Also, an area known as Camp Cartoon Network opened in 1998. It was a sub-section of the park's Yukon Territory. The rides were themed to Hanna-Barbera properties that aired in reruns on Cartoon Network at the time rather than original Cartoon Network programming (despite characters such as Johnny Bravo, Cow & Chicken, and Dexter from Dexter's Laboratory, appearing on the sign). In 2008, the area was renamed to simply Camp Cartoon, and the original CN characters were removed from the sign. Starting in 2018, the area was gradually re-themed to remove all Hanna-Barbera intellectual properties.

=== Kings Dominion ===
The Happy Land of Hanna-Barbera (1975–1997)

The earlier Land of the Dooz Mine Train attraction became Smurf Mountain. It was eventually closed to make room for the defunct Volcano: The Blast Coaster in 1998.

=== Kings Island ===
When Kings Island opened in 1972, one of its original themed areas was The Happy Land of Hanna Barbera. Original attractions included:

- Scooby-Doo, a wooden roller coaster; it was renamed the Beastie in 1980 and Fairly Odd Coaster in 2006. It is now known as the Woodstock Express.
- Enchanted Voyage (1972-1983)
- Winnie Witch's Cauldrons (1972–1991)
- Gulliver's Rub-A-Dub (1972–1982)
- Boo-Boo's Buggies (1972–1991)
- Boo-Boo's Baggage Claim (1972–2005)
- Jetson's Jet Orbiters (1972–2005)
- Baba Looey's Buggies (1972–2005)

Additionally, the parking lot featured a combination of a Hanna-Barbera character and a number to help guests remember their location at the end of the day.

Flintstone's Boulder Bumpers was added to the park in 1977. The 1977 park season wrapped with the Peanut Olympics, between teams led by Billy Carter, United States President Carter's younger brother, and Yogi Bear. The two-day event was won by Carter.

For the park's 10th anniversary in 1982, it expanded Hanna-Barbera Land, spending $2.1 million on the new attractions. Bill Hanna and Joe Barbera attended the media preview on Monday, April 9 at 10 am. The new attractions were:

- Yogi's Picnic, a live show
- the Woodland Theatre, with a puppet show
- Gumball Alley
- Hanna-Barbera Character Carousel
- a Hanna-Barbera Character Fountain
- climbing structures Shaggy's Silly Sticks and McScrappy's Farm
- Fool House
- Scooby Choo
- Jelly Bean Bowl

The Enchanted Voyage ride was closed in 1983, to be retrofitted to the upcoming Smurfs television series. "The Smurfs' Enchanted Voyage" debuted in 1984, while the television series was popular. People would ride in a boat around the world of the Smurfs celebrating the seasons of winter, fall, summer and spring.

The Flying Carpet slide was moved to Hanna-Barbera Land in 1986, becoming Scrappy's Slide.

Five rides were added to Hanna-Barbera Land in 1992. In 1994, Sunshine Turnpike was closed, to give more room for a new children's area. The Hanna-Barbera attraction received competition in 1995, from a "Nickelodeon Splat City" section. The park was purchased by Paramount Parks in 1992 and a $750,000 upgrade was made to the section; new attractions were the Enchanted Theatre, Scooby Zoom, Pixie and Dixie's Swingset and Dick Dastardly's Biplanes. Additionally, the Smurfs Enchanted Voyage was retrofitted for $3.5 million, into the Phantom Theatre. In 1998, Scooby's Ghoster Coaster (their second Scooby-Doo-themed coaster), Yogi's Skytours and Atom Ant's Airways were added to the park; Scooby Zoom was renamed Top Cat's Taxi Jam and Flintstone Flybots turned into Jetson's Jet Orbiters.

Nickelodeon Central was added to the park in 2001, taking over parts of Parts of Rivertown and Hanna-Barbera Land. For seven years in a row, 2001–2008, the collective kids area at the park has received Amusement Today magazine's "Golden Ticket for Best Kids' Area in the World in 2007".

The area was removed at the end of the 2005 season, to make way for Nickelodeon Universe, featuring 18 "new" rides. Scooby-Doo and the Haunted Castle was the only ride to remain as-is, having been created in 2003 as a complete overhaul of the existing Phantom Theater ride. The attraction was the park's first interactive ride.

The replacement section had SpongeBob SquarePants- and Dora the Explorer-themed neighbourhoods and 18 attractions. The Nickelodeon theming remained until 2010, when the area was rethemed to Planet Snoopy.

- Atom Ant's Airways is now Sally's Sea Plane
- Yogi's Sky Tours is now Woodstock Whirlybirds
- Top Cat's Taxi Jam is now The Great Pumpkin Coaster
- Pixie and Dixie's Swingset is now Charlie Browns Wind-Up
- Dick Dastardly's Biplanes is now Snoopy Vs. Red Baron
- Hanna Barbera Carousel is now Character Carousel
- Quick Draw's Railway is now Snoopy's Junction
- Flintstone's Boulder Bumpers is now Joe Cool's Dodgem School
- Fender Bender 500 is now PEANUTS 500
- Scooby Doo/Beastie is now Woodstock Express
- Huck's Hotrods is now PEANUTS Off Road Rally
- Alley Cat 500 is now Linus' Beetle Bugs

==== Shows with H-B characters ====
- 1979-80: The Yabba-Dabba Doo Caperoo (American Heritage Music Hall)
- 1981: Land of Happiness (International Showplace)
- 1982: Grin N Bear It (international Showplace)
- 1984: The Smurfs Are Here (International Showplace)
- 1985: Song of the Smurfs (International Showplace)
- 1986: The Curse of Gargamel (International Showplace)
- 1987: Yogi's Funtastic Machine (International Showplace)
- 1988: Yogi's Great Election (International Showplace)
- 1989: Scooby's School Daze (International Showplace)

=== Wonderland Sydney ===
Hanna-Barbera Land (1985–2002) at Australia's Wonderland (later named Wonderland Sydney) was largely based on the layout of the Canada's Wonderland park's section.

=== Small Flintstones parks ===
- Bedrock City in Custer, South Dakota (1966–2015)
- Bedrock City in Valle, Arizona (1972–present)
- Bedrock City in Kelowna, British Columbia (1970s–1998)
- Bedrock City / Dinotown in Chilliwack, British Columbia (1975–1994)
- Calaway Park in Springbank, Alberta

== Attractions ==
=== Scooby's Gasping Ghoster Coaster ===
It was a prototype Caripo Batflyer suspended roller coaster (billed as the first suspended coaster for kids). The ride had poor capacity and roughness complaints. It was removed in 2005 as a part of the Hanna-Barbera Land retheming at Kings Island For Nickelodeon Universe. However, the attraction using the same name in the city of Doswell, Virginia and in Vaughan, Ontario, Canada kept its name until 2010 when the Canadian version was renamed into simply the Ghoster Coaster. In Doswell, Virginia, although the name was also simplified, the usual Scooby-Doo theme was kept.

=== Scooby-Doo ===
Themed to Scooby-Doo, it was opened together with Kings Island in 1972. The second one was opened in 1974 at Kings Dominion, prior to the park's official 1975 opening. It was also opened in Carowinds. Paying homage to The Beast after its successful launch in 1979, a tunnel was added to the bottom of the first drop for the 1980 season, and the Kings Island version was renamed "the Beastie".

When those two parks were under the ownership of Viacom, they started to add areas themed to the Nickelodeon television channel. In 2005, during the process of re-branding of the roller coaster as the Fairly Odd Coaster, the wooden superstructure was painted indigo and the cars repainted to mimic the characters Cosmo and Wanda from The Fairly OddParents; one train pink and the other green, with the fairies' faces on the front of the cars. To depict these characters as roller coaster trains is accurate to the television show because on screen, the fairies can change their shape at will, though their faces always remain visible on whatever they become.

The same thing was done to the Kings Island version a year later. Ironically, Cedar Fair purchased both of those parks, as well as the three other parks that were owned by Viacom. Cedar Fair then decided to remove all remaining Hanna-Barbera and Nickelodeon themes from the kids area in time for the start of the 2010 season, and are now PEANUTS themed.

=== Scooby-Doo Spooky Coaster ===
Unusually, this attraction is a Wild Mouse roller coaster. It is not located at any of the former Paramount Parks altogether. It was built in 2002 and located in Warner Bros. Movie World in Gold Coast, Queensland, Australia.

=== Scooby-Doo's Haunted Mansion ===
This attraction was Carowinds, Kings Dominion, Kings Island and Canada's Wonderland's take on the traditional dark ride. On this ride, the scenes feature ghosts and monsters that riders shoot at using laser-outfitted guns. Riders in consecutive cars compete with each other to see who can shoot the most ghosts. In the United Kingdom, it was called Scooby-Doo and the Haunted Castle. It was possibly themed to the TV show What's New, Scooby-Doo?. The ride was re-themed on November 27, 2009, to remove the Scooby-Doo characters. The move is part of the park's broader move away from Hanna-Barbera characters. It became Boo Blasters on Boo Hill, a shooting dark ride themed to a large ghost.

=== Baba Looey's Buggies ===
Located in the South Pie section of Hanna-Barbera Land, these were simple handcars on a track. The Kings Island version was removed to make way for the Nickelodeon Universe expansion.

=== Jetson's Jet Orbiters ===
It was seen in Kings Island until 2005 due to the makeover to Nick Universe. It was known as a legal successor to the Flintstone Flybots and themed to The Jetsons.

=== McScrappy's Slide ===
This was a giant slide originally called the Flying Carpet Slide, which was moved from Coney Island to the spot where Zephyr is today. It was later relocated to Hanna-Barbera Land for the 1986 season (about where Flying Ace Aerial Chase is today) and renamed McScrappy's Slide. The attraction was removed indefinitely in 1995 to make way for the addition of Nickelodeon Splat City.

=== Attractions themed to Top Cat ===
Two attractions themed to the TV show Top Cat, named Top Cat's Taxi Jam and the Alley Cat 500, were located in Kings Island and Kings Dominion. Rumors said that the Alley Cat 500 was the predecessor to the Swiper's Sweepers, which closed permanently in 2010 when Cedar Fair decided to remove all remaining Hanna-Barbera and Nickelodeon themes in time for the start of the 2010 season. Top Cat's Taxi Jam was the successor of Scooby Zoom. From 2006 to 2010, it was known as Little Bill's Giggle Coaster. It was succeeded by the Great Pumpkin Coaster, which was introduced on September 8, 2009.

=== Other attractions ===
Attractions themed to The Flintstones also appear in Warner Bros. World Abu Dhabi and South Africa's Gold Reef City.

No attractions themed to Tom and Jerry appeared in any of the former Paramount Parks or Wonderland Sydney, although a promotional advertisement with Tom Cat holding a sign was shown in Canada's Wonderland prior to 2009 and there is a roller coaster called Tom & Jerry that has been operating at Parque Warner Madrid since 2002. The Super Friends shows which were also made by Hanna-Barbera never appeared in any of the Hanna-Barbera parks; the characters from those shows are controlled by Warner Bros. and are featured at Six Flags and Warner Bros. amusement parks.

The Hanna-Barbera attractions do not include shows such as The Powerpuff Girls, Dexter's Laboratory, or other shows that were co-produced with Cartoon Network Studios. Nor do they include most licensed properties such as Snorks, Pac-Man or Richie Rich, with The Smurfs being the sole licensed property to be featured among Hanna-Barbera attractions.

== As individual attractions ==
- Universal Studios Florida: In Production Central, characters appearing are Yogi Bear, Boo-Boo Bear, the Flintstones, the Jetsons, Scooby-Doo and Shaggy. In Woody Woodpecker's KidZone, Scooby, Shaggy, Velma, Daphne and Fred appear.
- Universal Studios Hollywood: Character photo-ops currently include Scooby-Doo and Shaggy; Fred Flintstone, Barney Rubble, Wilma Flintstone, and Betty Rubble previously appeared.
