= Danny Phantom Ghost Zone =

Flat ride in Nickelodeon Universe

Nickelodeon Universe
- Status: Removed
- Opening date: August 11, 1992
- Closing date: July 11, 2015
- Replaced by: Shredder's Mutant Masher

Ride statistics
- Attraction type: Falling Star
- Manufacturer: Chance Rides
- Height restriction: 42 in (107 cm)

Danny Phantom Ghost Zone (formerly known as Screaming Yellow Eagle) was a flat ride located in Nickelodeon Universe in the Mall of America. It was a Chance Falling star attraction that was located at the east entrance of the park.

== Description ==
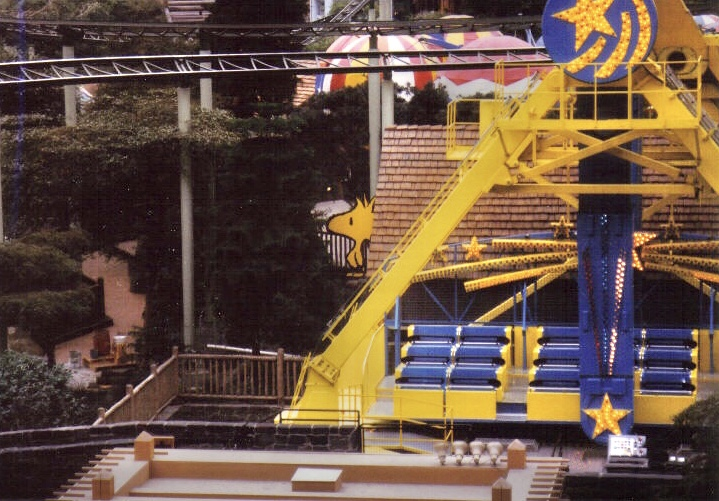
Woodstock near the Screaming Yellow Eagle in 2004.

The ride was moderate in speed compared to other rides of its type. The ride had lap bars that came down on riders that site theater style facing one direction. Thirty two people may ride at once. Minimum rider height: 42 inches. The ride rotated riders around the axle clockwise and counter-clockwise, coming close to the ceiling.

This was one of the few attractions in the world themed to Danny Phantom, another notable attraction is located at Kings Island known as "Phantom Flyers" (this has since been renamed to "Linus' Launcher" in 2010 after a makeover to the children area of the park now named "Planet Snoopy")

The base color was formerly yellow with blue support legs and the gondola was mainly yellow, featuring star elements. From the park's opening in 1992 to the loss of the Peanuts characters in 2006, Woodstock was formerly featured on the mechanical building behind the attraction, although the attraction was not themed to a specific Peanuts character.

=== Closure ===
On July 7, 2015, the park announced that the last chance to ride Danny Phantom Ghost Zone would be July 11, 2015. In November 2015, it was replaced by Shredder's Mutant Masher. It is based on Shredder, one of the villains from the Nickelodeon show, Teenage Mutant Ninja Turtles.

=== 1998 accident ===
On August 15, 1998, 14 days after the Log Chute accident, an 8-year-old girl had a heart attack after riding The Screaming Yellow Eagle, which was working properly. The girl died as a result of heart problems.
