= Kings Entertainment Company =

Former American theme park operator

- Industry: Entertainment
- Successor: Paramount Parks
- Headquarters: Charlotte, North Carolina
- Area served: Worldwide

Kings Entertainment Company (KECO) owned and/or operated six theme parks around the world. The company was originally owned by Taft Broadcasting and in 1984 was purchased for $167.5 million by senior executives and general managers of Taft's Amusement Park Group.

In 1992, the company was sold to Paramount Communications (formerly Gulf+Western, and later acquired by Viacom), then the parent of Paramount Pictures, which changed the name of the parks by adding "Paramount's" in front of their names. The park in Australia was not purchased by Paramount and was sold to a local company.

The company was renamed Paramount Parks in 1994, around the time of the Viacom purchase, and remained in existence until 2006. As part of the 2005 Viacom split, ownership of Paramount Parks was transferred to the CBS Corporation.

CBS, in turn, sold the parks to amusement park management company Cedar Fair Entertainment Company based in Sandusky, Ohio on June 30, 2006 (CBS decided that the parks would not fit a new corporate strategy that they were implementing). Beginning in January 2007, Cedar Fair began dropping the Paramount name from the individual parks and restoring their original KECO names with new Cedar Fair logos. This transaction also returned the parks to Ohio-based ownership, as Taft was once headquartered in Cincinnati.

On July 1, 2024, Cedar Fair merged with competitor Six Flags, forming the Six Flags Entertainment Corporation.

== Theme parks ==
The company owned:

- Canada's Wonderland, Vaughan, Ontario, Canada (sold to Paramount, now owned by Six Flags)
- Great America, Santa Clara, California (Sold to Paramount, now owned by Six Flags)
- Kings Island, Mason, Ohio (Sold to Paramount, now owned by Six Flags)
- Carowinds, Charlotte, North Carolina (Sold to Paramount, now owned by Six Flags)
- Kings Dominion, Doswell, Virginia (Sold to Paramount, now owned by Six Flags)
- Australia's Wonderland, Sydney, New South Wales, Australia (Sold to Sunway Group, now defunct)
- Hanna Barbera Land, Houston, Texas (sold to Six Flags and reopened as Splashtown)
- Marineland of the Pacific, Palos Verdes, California (sold to Harcourt Brace Jovanovich then owner of SeaWorld and promptly closed)

== See also ==
- Hanna-Barbera theme park attractions
