= Pepsi Orange Streak =

Roller coaster in Bloomington, Minnesota

- Previously known as Pepsi Ripsaw
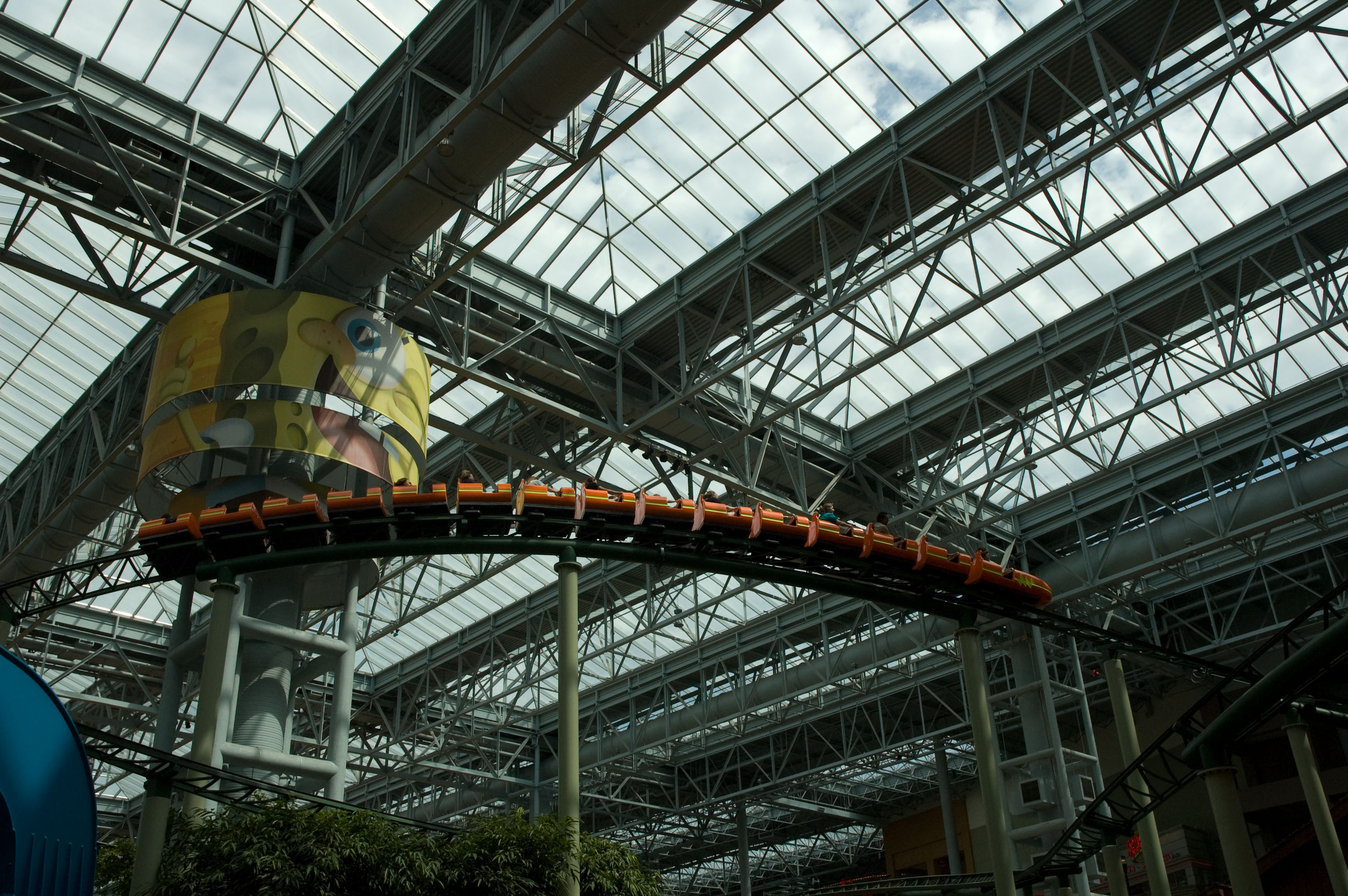
- Pepsi Orange Streak(After Re-Theming)

Nickelodeon Universe
- Location: Nickelodeon Universe
- Coordinates: 44°51′15″N 93°14′32″W
- Status: Operating
- Opening date: August 11, 1992

General statistics
- Type: Steel – Indoor
- Manufacturer: Zierer
- Designer: Werner Stengel
- Lift/launch system: Friction Wheels
- Height: 60 ft (18 m)
- Drop: 40 ft (12 m)
- Length: 2,680 ft (820 m)
- Speed: 40 mph (64 km/h)
- Inversions: 0
- Duration: 2:30
- Capacity: 1000 riders per hour
- Trains: 2 trains with 15 cars. Riders are arranged 2 across in a single row for a total of 30 riders per train.
- Pepsi Orange Streak at RCDB

Pepsi Orange Streak (formerly known as Pepsi Ripsaw) is a custom Zierer roller coaster located in Nickelodeon Universe in the Mall of America. It is located in the west side of the park, and debuted with the park in August 1992. Some of its features include two lift hills, a tunnel through the Log Chute, and three large helices, twisting its way through the park. The ride is sponsored by Pepsi, Mall of America's official soft drink.

== Ride experience ==
The ride vehicles exit the elevated platform at the boarding station, and travel up a 40 foot hill. The vehicles then make a sharp turn at the west-end of the building. The coaster proceeds to make two fast turns and runs to the opposite end of the building, with a few track-bumps along the way. The ride then slows to a crawl as it travels around the park's Log Chute attraction. The coaster then makes another tight turn and heads back into the boarding station.

== History ==
Since the ride travels throughout a decent amount of the theme park, it was built with steel track and nylon wheels, to keep its noise-levels relatively low.

The attraction was originally named "Pepsi Ripsaw" when the mall's theme park was themed to Camp Snoopy in 1992. It was then renamed to "Pepsi Orange Streak" during the rebranding to Nickelodeon Universe.

The track color is currently green with cream colored pylons. The ride used to have rustic looking, mine cart themed trains when it was known as Pepsi Ripsaw, but were changed to sleek orange trains during the theme park's retheming to Nickelodeon Universe.

The Pepsi Orange Streak's station currently shares space with the Rugrats Reptarmobiles attraction in a blue building, with designs similar to the front of Pepsi bottles and cans. This area of the station building used to contain a wilderness-themed shooting gallery.
