= Hanna-Barbera Land =

Former theme park near Houston, Texas

- Interactive map of Hanna-Barbera Land
- Location: Spring, Texas, U.S.
- Coordinates: 30.070°N 95.432°W
- Status: Defunct
- Opened: March 31, 1984; 42 years ago
- Closed: 1985
- Owner: Kings Entertainment Company
- General manager: Joseph Barbera
- Theme: Hanna-Barbera

Hanna-Barbera Land was a theme park based on the cartoons of the Hanna-Barbera animation studio. It was located in Spring, Texas, United States, north of Houston, and operated for the 1984 and 1985 seasons. After the park's closure following the 1985 season, the rides were sold and the land was reused as a water park, which is now operating as Six Flags Hurricane Harbor SplashTown.

== History ==
Subsections of larger theme parks featured characters from the Hanna-Barbera animation studio prior to 1984, primarily the parks owned by Taft Broadcasting such as Kings Island (1972), Kings Dominion (1975), Carowinds (1975), and Canada's Wonderland (1981).

The standalone theme park in Spring was built by Taft Broadcasting, which became the Kings Entertainment Company as of opening. Kings also owned the Australia's Wonderland, Canada's Wonderland, Carowinds, Kings Dominion, and Kings Island theme parks. The park was open daily from 10 a.m. to 8 p.m. except Saturdays, when the park closed at 10 p.m. The 1984 season lasted until Labor Day. Admission was US$6.50 (equivalent to $20 in 2025) for children and adults from Sunday through Friday, rising to US$7.50 (equivalent to $23 in 2025) on Saturdays; one grandparent was admitted free with each paid admission.

Despite increased attendance in 1985, a number of factors led to the park's closure. An oil bust in the early 1980s severely impacted the economy of the Greater Houston area, along with competition with the well-established and more centrally located AstroWorld, as well as minimal spending in the park on concessions, gift shop purchases, and souvenirs all eventually doomed the park.

The park was sold to private investors and the SplashTown USA water park was built in its place; the water park was sold again to Bryant Morris, then to Six Flags which purchased it in 1999. After initially not wanting to brand and call it "a member of the Six Flags family," Six Flags eventually decided to re-brand it as Six Flags SplashTown. In 2007 it was sold to PARC Management, which renamed it to Wet N' Wild Splashtown. After the park returned to Six Flags management as part of a 2019 operating agreement, it was rebranded Six Flags Hurricane Harbor SplashTown.

== Attractions ==
Visitors entered the park through a large rainbow archway.

The park featured:

- A character carousel, including Jabberjaw, Dino, and Yogi Bear
- A Scooby-Doo roller coaster, now at California's Great America as Woodstock's Express
- Boulder Bumpers
- Silly Stix, an enormous jungle gym of sorts that looked like it was constructed out of giant Tinker Toys; it was repainted and rebranded as "Pepsi Pavilion" for the replacement water park.
- H.B.L. Funliner
- The Funsonium, a "do-seum" designed by Edwin Schlossberg which housed interactive and educational hands-on games and experiences such as Your Name in Lights and You Are the Star; in addition, a continuous feed of Scooby-Doo cartoons was shown
- Pedal boats with themed characters including Snagglepuss, Quick Draw McGraw, and Huckleberry Hound
- Water body slides, added for 1985
- Puppet shows
- Papa Smurf's Forest restaurant
- A live Keystone Cops brass band (branded the 'Kops of Komedy') that performed Hanna Barbera theme songs
- 'Rufus the Rainmaker', a live performance featuring the "leading authority in the art of rainmaking"
