= Nickelodeon Splat City =

Nickelodeon Splat City was a themed area inside of California's Great America (1995–2002), Kings Island (1995–2000), and Kings Dominion (1995–1999). It was based on many Nickelodeon shows, such as Double Dare, which had attractions that involved getting wet or messy.

== Attractions ==
- Green Slime Zone: An attraction that involved guests navigating a maze of pipework that randomly burst with water, and in the early years, green tinted water. The maze still stands at one theme park, California's Great America, named Snoopy's Splash Dance.
- Green Slime Transfer Truck: A truck that featured water hoses, video screens, and various levers and buttons triggering water bursts. The truck was also added at the Nickelodeon Studios, but was different than the one at Splat City (minus water hoses and video screens). The one at the Studios was used as a setting for U-Dip segments on Nick in the Afternoon, the one at Splat City looked similar to the Studios' Slime Geyser.
- Emergency Slime Shower and Slime Pit: A slime-dripping shower that poured slime on those who pressed its lever. The shower was located over a large pit of Green Slime, and Slime often poured from the sides and top of the tower. The one located at California's Great America still stands, albeit with a new paint job.
- Crystal Slime Aerobic Mining Maze: An obstacle course that was like play areas at Chuck E. Cheese's
- Big Rig GS-1: A large Oil Rig that spewed water every 15 minutes. Two of them still stand today, each with new color schemes (and one with a Wild Thornberrys theme).
- Slime Bowl: A large theater that featured shows with Nicktoons and game shows. The following shows ran in the Slime Bowl Theater before the respective areas were converted to Nickelodeon Central.
  - 1995–1996: Mega Mess-a-Mania - A messy show that took elements from Double Dare, You Can't Do That on Television, and What Would You Do?, and combined them together into one messy game show experience. The finale of the show involved Green Slime being shot out of portions of the set, as well as three "Slime Towers" located in the audience seating area. This show was taped exclusively to sell to the audience of the show.
  - 1997: More Mega Mess-a-Mania - the sequel to the previous show, this edition features more Nicktoon-inspired games and content, and featured characters such as Krumm, Ickis and Oblina from Aaahh!!! Real Monsters and Angelica from Rugrats.
  - 1998: Nicktoons' Block Party - A brand-new show which featured games and performances based on popular Nicktoons at that time. The set featured a large cityscape in which characters would pop out of windows and doors on stage. The show featured characters like Tommy, Chuckie, and Angelica from Rugrats, and Norbert and Daggett from The Angry Beavers.
  - 1999: Nicktoons' Rockin' Countdown - A New Year's Eve/Millennium themed version of the previous show complete with a simulated "ball drop" from the top of a building in the theater, a brand new climactic game called "Do Dil's Diapers", and the return of the Rugrats and Angry Beavers, but with an appearance by "Guest DJ" CatDog to teach the audience "The CatDog Scratch".
  - 2000–2001: Nicktoons' Summer Jam - an updated version of the previous show, with a summer theme and new games based on popular shows. SpongeBob SquarePants also makes an onstage appearance along with Angelica to cheer on the teams. Norbert, Daggett, and CatDog continue to make appearances.
  - 2002: Slimetime Live on Stage - A live version of the popular block, the show featured games and segments based on the television block as well as an appearance by SpongeBob SquarePants and Plankton.
- Green Slime Mine Cart Coaster: a mini roller coaster that only existed at California's Great America in Splat City.
- Gak Kitchen: a small area where the Gak and Slime was made for the game shows in the Slime Bowl. These kitchens were converted to character meet and greet areas in 1997, and became home to Tommy, Chuckie, and Angelica from Rugrats.
