= Log Chute =

Amusement ride

Coordinates: 44°51′17.68″N 93°14′28.83″W

Log Flume
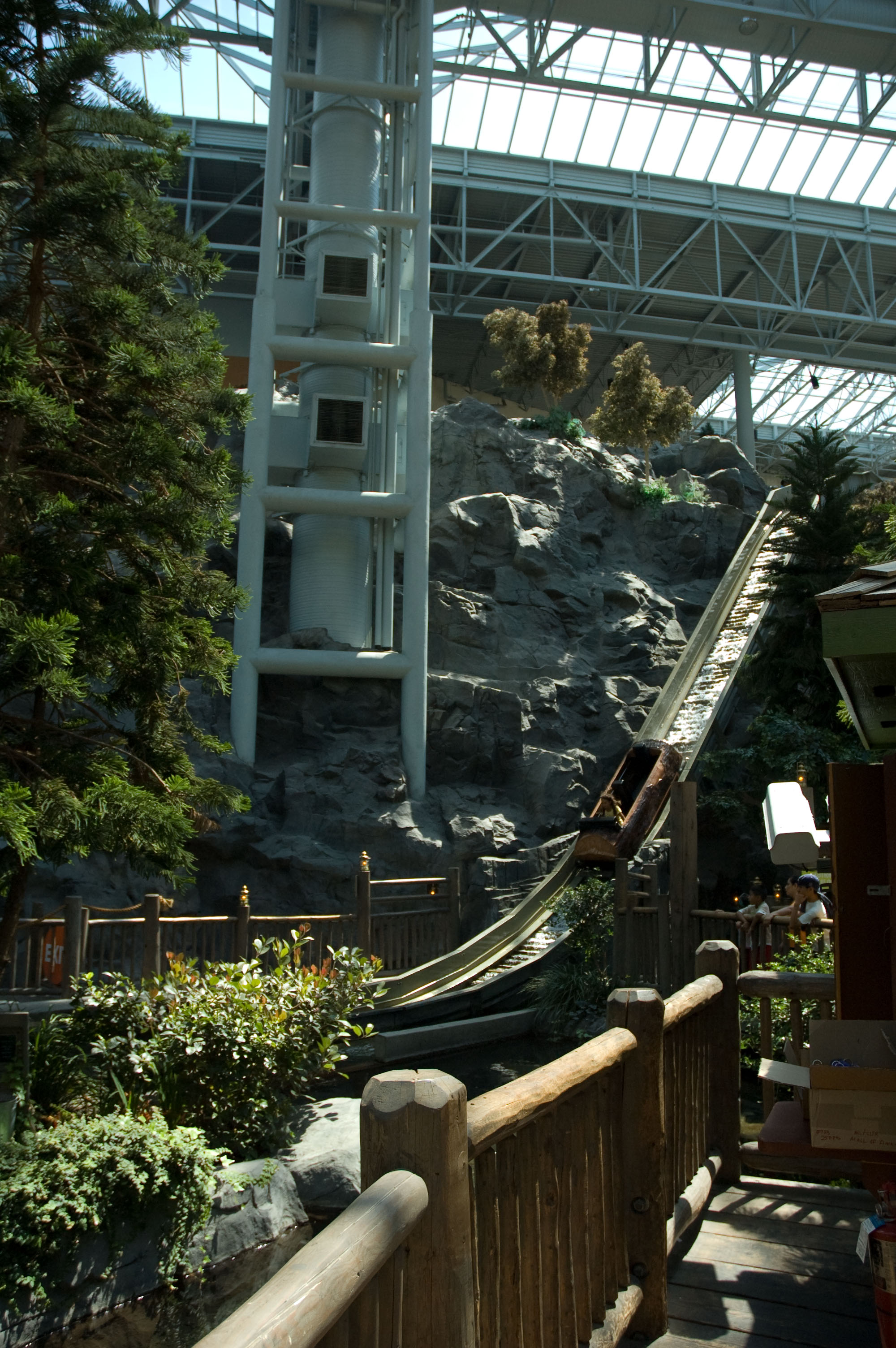
- Final splashdown chute at the end of the ride

Nickelodeon Universe
- Status: Operating
- Opening date: August 11, 1992; 34 years ago

General statistics
- Type: Log flume
- Manufacturer: Hopkins Rides
- Lift system: 2 conveyor belt lifts
- Drop: 40 ft (12 m)
- Height Restriction: 36 in (91 cm) with adult, 47 in (120 cm) alone

Log Chute, formerly known as Paul Bunyan's Log Chute sometimes Fog Chute for Halloween or Yule Log Chute for Christmas, and the Love Chute for Valentine's Day is a log flume attraction sponsored by Xcel Energy (formerly sponsored by Brawny) at Mall of America's Nickelodeon Universe in Bloomington, Minnesota. It opened on August 11, 1992, and is one of the mall's oldest surviving acquisitions from Knott's Camp Snoopy. The ride is based on the tall tale of Paul Bunyan and is set in a mountain lumber mill featuring two lift hills and two drops as passengers experience singing animatronics, including a 19-foot tall Paul Bunyan (modeled after the Brawny mascot) and Babe the Blue Ox. The attraction was designed to keep riders dry enough so that they could comfortably continue shopping. Holiday overlays for Halloween and Christmas have been put into place since 2017 with the "Fog Chute" and "Yule Log Chute", with the animatronic characters being dressed in festive costumes. For Halloween, Paul has been dressed as a pirate, Jim Hopper from Stranger Things, and Hulk Hogan promoting the short-lived Pastamania restaurant once housed in the mall. A 2022 April Fools Day prank had the attraction become the "Kenny Loggins Chute" with Paul being dressed as the musician.

The ride is also the site of Harmon Killebrew's 520-foot home run record at the former Metropolitan Stadium and is marked by one of the stadium's original chairs located on the wall above the ride.

== Background ==
After going through a queue winding through a mine within the attraction's mountain, guests board their logs and make their way through Paul's logging camp, with one of his axes being set near a bend in the river while singing can be heard throughout. As guests enter the kitchen, riders see workers preparing Paul's breakfast of giant pancakes, with an enormous bottle of Knott's Berry Farm brand Boysenberry Syrup on the table left over from the park's Camp Snoopy days. Going outside, the flume passes another of Paul's axes and various critters such as beavers and skunks before going inside again to pass a bear cub in a tree and more lumberjacks. After this is the attraction's first drop, which leads guests into a cave to see Paul Bunyan and Babe pulling down trees. Paul warns the riders of the saw mill ahead as we go up a lift hill. The saw operator quickly notices the riders and turns off the saw and hopes to see guests again before guests go down the second drop, which is home to the attraction's on-ride photo camera. A short loop brings riders back to the boarding station.

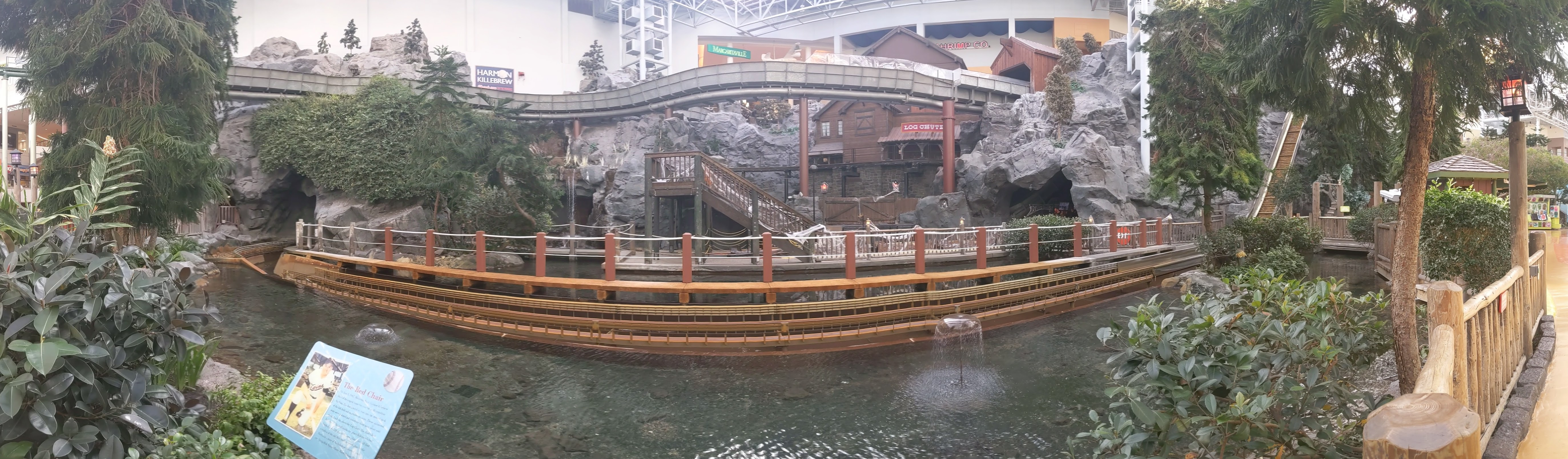
Panoramic photo of the splashdown and loading areas. The "Red Chair" marking Harmon Killebrew's home run record is visible in the background (and a plaque in the foreground).

== Accidents ==
- On August 20, 1992, the ride was shut down for five hours due to a faulty gear. Maintenance workers noticed that the gear that ran the conveyor belt had started to strip. Park officials stated the fault never posed a safety risk.
- On Saturday, August 1, 1998, a 12-year-old boy fell off the log chute. As his boat neared the top of the final chute, the boy began to panic and stood up to reach a railing. The ride was stopped, but the boat began to fall. Losing his grip, he fell off the chute, falling onto the landscaping rocks, and later died from the injuries he sustained. O.D. Hopkins Associates, Inc., the manufacturer of the ride, inspected it and found that the ride was in proper working order, and that restraints would not have prevented the incident, while a safety consultant disagreed with the latter statement. It was the park's (then Camp Snoopy)'s first major accident.
- On November 4, 2007, a conveyor belt malfunctioned, causing one log-themed boat to crash into another. There were only minor injuries. The ride was inspected and fixed. The ride re-opened on November 15, 2007.
