= Woodstock's Express (California's Great America) =

Roller coaster

Woodstock Express
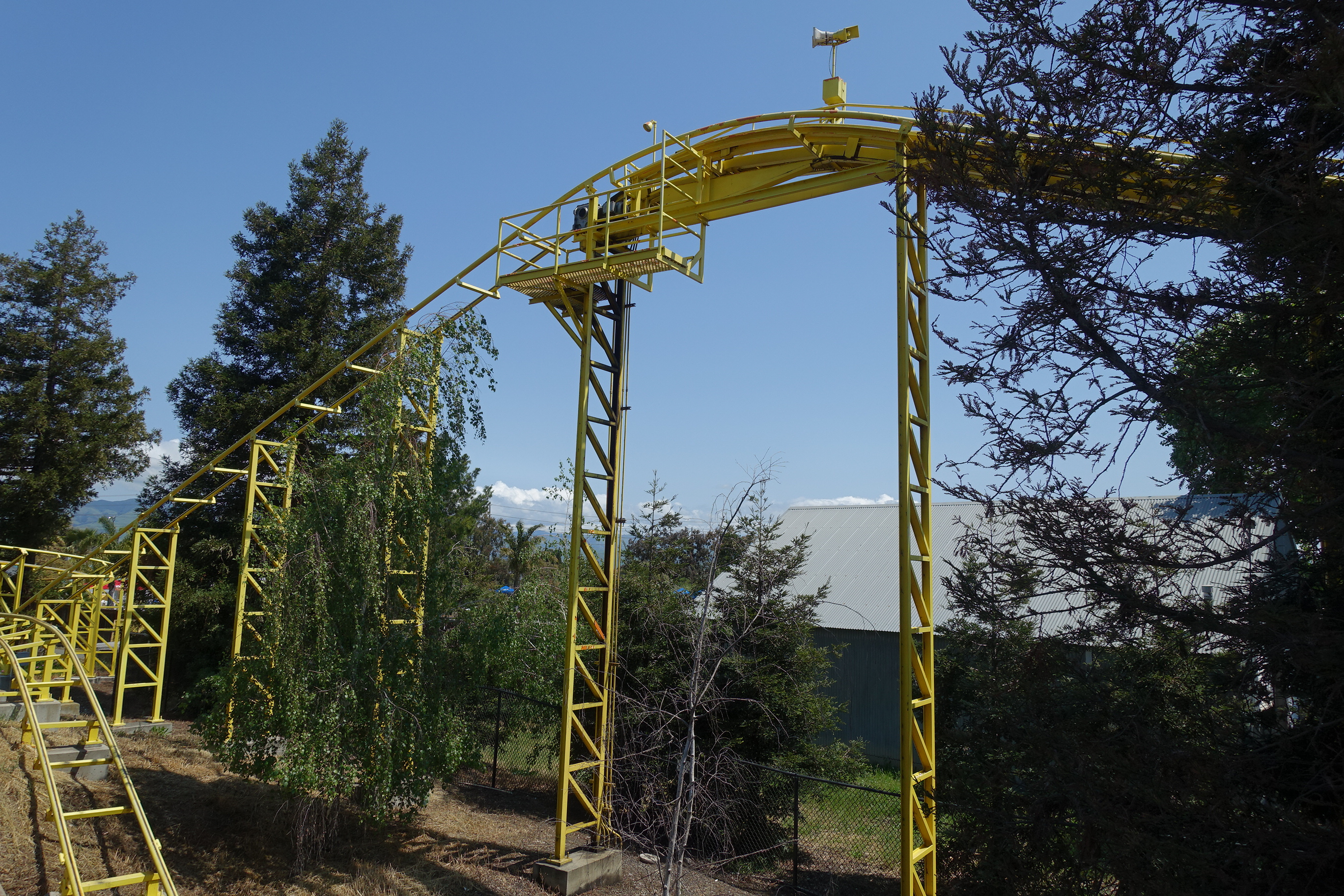
- Woodstock Express in 2017

California's Great America
- Park section: Planet Snoopy
- Coordinates: 40.579326°N 75.532553°W
- Status: Operating
- Opening date: 1987

Hanna-Barbera Land
- Status: Removed
- Opening date: 1984
- Closing date: 1986

General statistics
- Type: Steel
- Manufacturer: Intamin
- Height: 36 ft (11 m)
- Length: 1,300 ft (400 m)
- Inversions: 0
- Height restriction: 46 in (117 cm)
- Trains: Single train with 4 cars; riders arranged 2 across in 2 rows for a total of 16 riders per train
- Woodstock Express at RCDB

Woodstock Express is a steel kiddie roller coaster located at California's Great America in Santa Clara, California. The coaster has slight drops and turns and uses a lap bar for guests' safety. It is themed to Woodstock, the best friend of Snoopy from the Peanuts comic strip. On November 6, 2026, Six Flags announced that California’s Great America would be permanently closing on September 6, 2027.

== History ==
Since the roller coaster opened in 1987, it has been re-themed at least three times. It was designed by Intamin and originally opened in 1984 as Scooby's Ghoster Coaster at Hanna-Barbera Land in Spring, Texas. The coaster moved to California's Great America, reopening in 1987 as Blue Streak. The coaster had a Smurfs theme when it opened within "Smurf Woods," a land featuring a Smurf village with mushroom houses. Smurf Woods was closed in the early 1990s.

Paramount Parks acquired Great America in 1993 and opened Nickelodeon Central. The coaster was given new yellow and green seats, and it was named Green Slime Mine Car in 1995. One Smurf house managed to survive; it may still be seen in the Picnic Grove area. In 2002, Paramount Parks repainted the coaster orange and re-themed it as Rugrats Runaway Reptar.

In 2007, Cedar Fair Entertainment Company acquired all 5 Paramount Parks (Kings Island, Canada's Wonderland, Carowinds, Kings Dominion, and California's Great America). The park did not have the license to use Nickelodeon property, so Nickelodeon Central was re-themed to Planet Snoopy in 2010. Cedar Fair (now Six Flags) gave the coaster a new yellow paint job and the name Woodstock Express; famously named after Snoopy's best friend, Woodstock.
