= Ali Baba (ride) =

Amusement ride

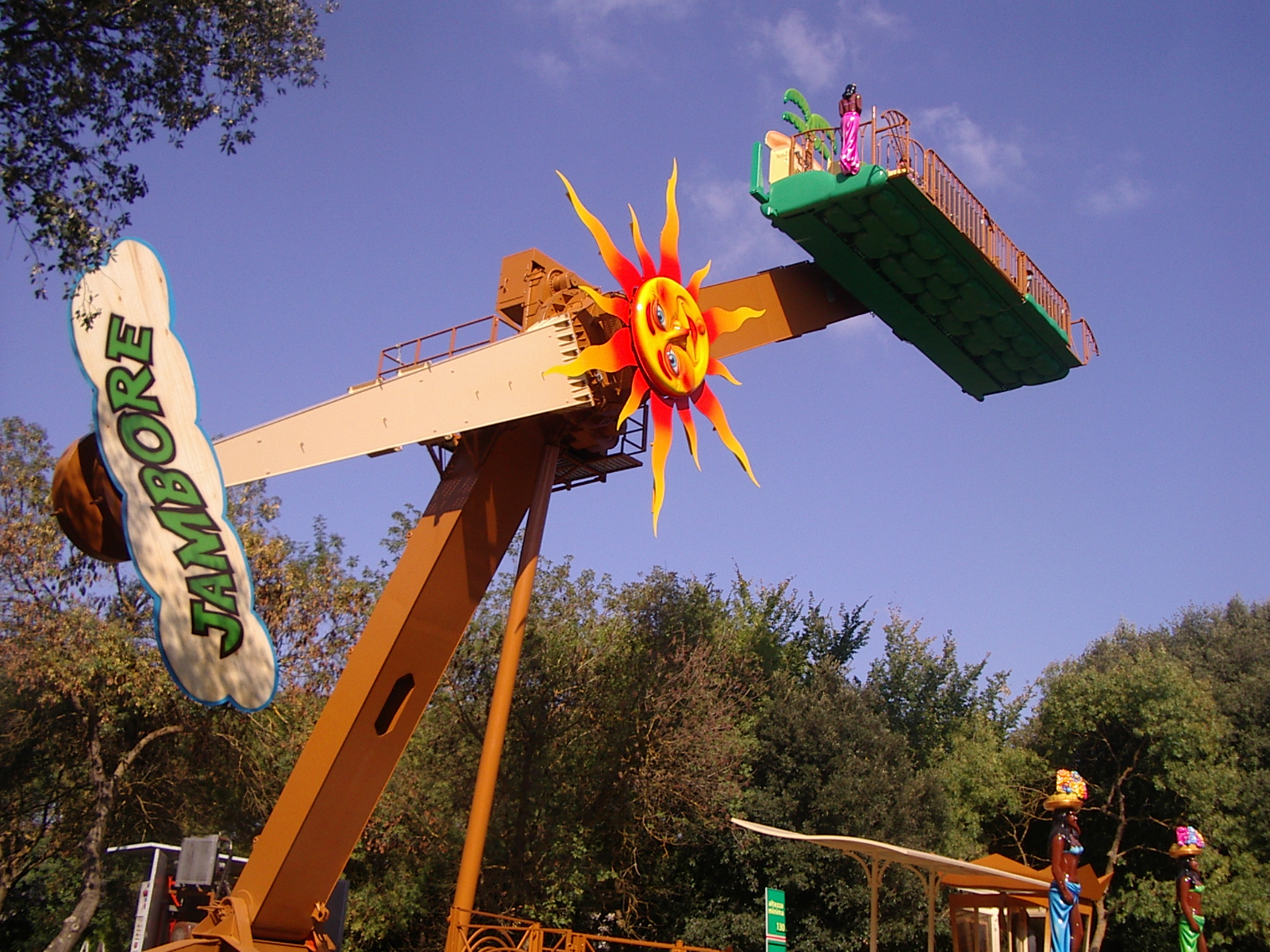
Jambore in motion, photographed at Cavallino Matto (it) in 2007, originally manufactured by HUSS

The Ali Baba (or magic carpet) is a type of amusement ride consisting of a stationary horizontal gondola with a 360 degree swinging pendulum.

== Design ==
A single stationary tower is attached to a base, or portable trailer with outriggers. Attached to the stationary tower is a swinging arm that moves with the push of a 64KW drive motor. Fixed to both sides of the swinging arm is an opposite propulsion conduction system via two drive shafts that run from the connection point of the stationary tower and swinging arm, to the connection point where the swinging arm attaches to the passenger gondola, which keep the passenger gondola upright. On the other end of the swinging arm is a counter weight, usually with the ride's name as an illuminated sign fixed to it.

== Operation ==
The arm with gondola attachment is swung back and forth and continues to gain in height until the arm makes a complete 360 degree turn. Most of these rides are operated with toggle handles.

== Safety features ==
- Double lock anti-air shoulder harnesses or lap bars that lock in absence of air.
- Emergency power cut off button.
- Operator foot pedal that completes electric circuit, also disabling controls in absence of operator.

== See also ==
- Rainbow (ride)
