= Camp Snoopy =

Peanuts-themed area at Six Flags parks

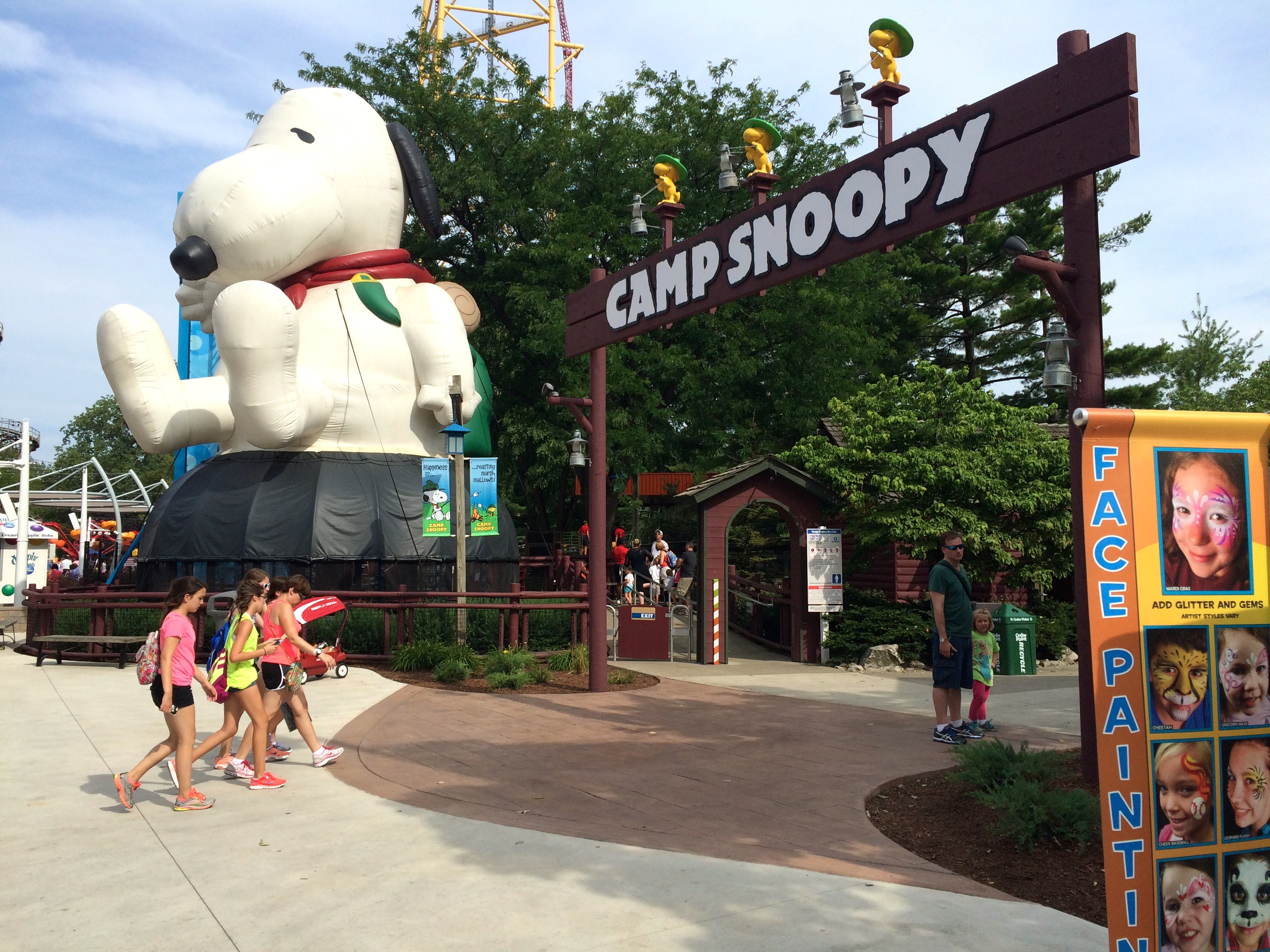
- Camp Snoopy entrance in Cedar Point near Snoopy Bounce.
- Opened: 1983; 43 years ago
- Theme: Peanuts

Current: 5 Six Flags and Enchanted Parks parks Former: 3 Six Flags parks

Camp Snoopy is a Peanuts-themed area for children at several Six Flags and Enchanted Parks amusement parks. All of them originally opened while the parks were under the ownership of Cedar Fair prior to its merger with Six Flags in 2024.

== History ==
Camp Snoopy was first introduced at Knott's Berry Farm in 1983. This was the first amusement park with a section dedicated to children under 12 years old.

On August 27, 2013, Camp Snoopy at Cedar Point received the relocated Frog Hopper which was renamed Woodstock's Airmail and Jr. Gemini was renamed Wilderness Run. On August 16, 2017, Carowinds announced Planet Snoopy would be re-themed and expanded by six new rides to create Camp Snoopy for the 2018 season. After multiple decades, Camp Snoopy officially reopened on June 27, 2024, at Knotts Berry Farm.

== Locations ==
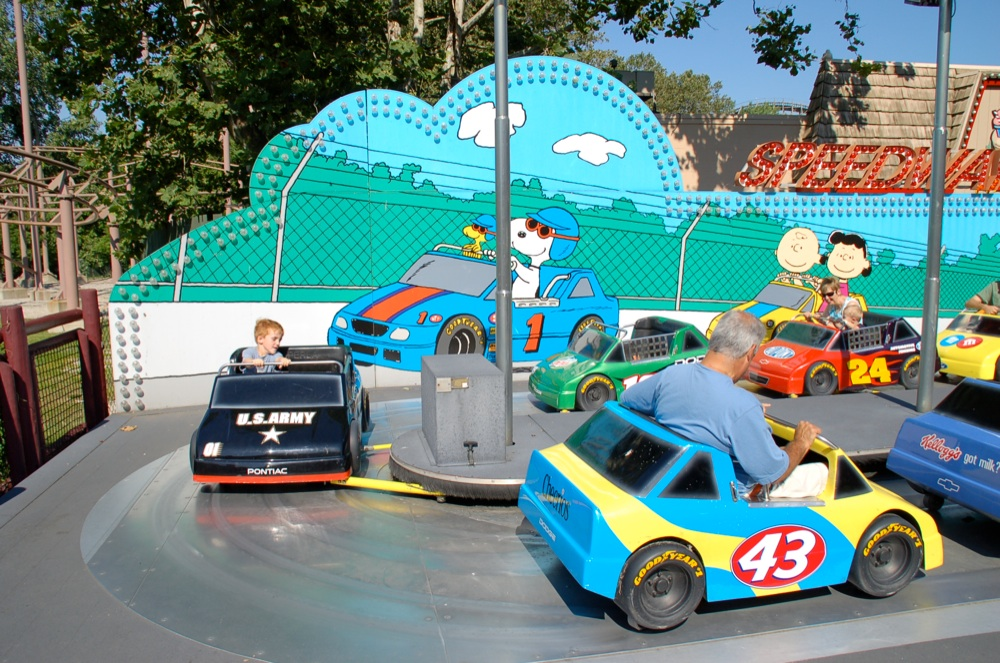
Peanuts 500 in the Camp Snoopy section of the park at Cedar Point

=== Current ===
Park	Location	Opening date	Replaced	Attractions
Carowinds	Charlotte, North Carolina	March 24, 2018	Planet Snoopy	14
Cedar Point	Sandusky, Ohio	May 9, 1999	Super Himalaya	9
Kings Island	Mason, Ohio	May 25, 2024	Snoopy's Snack Shack/Planet Snoopy	6
Knott's Berry Farm	Buena Park, California	July 1, 1983	The Cable Car	13
Michigan's Adventure	Muskegon, Michigan	May 29, 2021	Be-Bop Blvd	6

=== Former ===
Park	Opened	Closed	Replacement
Dorney Park & Wildwater Kingdom	2000	2010	Planet Snoopy
Mall of America	1992	2006	Nickelodeon Universe
Worlds of Fun	2001	2010	Planet Snoopy

== Rides ==
- Carowinds: Beagle Scout Acres, Camp Bus, Charlie Brown’s River Raft Blast, Charlie Brown's Wind-Up, Flying Ace Balloon Race, Kite Eating Tree, Peanuts Pirates, Peanuts Trailblazers, Pig Pens Mud Buggies, Snoopy’s Racing Railway, Snoopy Vs. Red Baron, Wilderness Run, Woodstock Express, Woodstock Whirlybirds
- Cedar Point: Balloon Race, Camp Bus, Charlie Brown's Wind-Up (Previously Lolli Swing until 2015), Linus’ Beetle Bugs, Peanuts 500, Red Baron, Wilderness Run, Woodstock Express, Woodstock's Airmail
- Kings Island: Beagle Scout Acres, Charlie Brown’s Rushing River Log Ride, Franklin’s Flyers, Linus Launcher, Snoopy's Soap Box Racers, Woodstock’s Air Rail
- Knott's Berry Farm: Balloon Race, Beagle Express Railroad, Charlie Brown's Kite Flyer, Flying Ace, Linus Launcher, Camp Snoopy Trail Trackers, Pig Pens Mud Buggies, Rapid River Run, Sally's Swing Along, Sierra Sidewinder, Snoopy's Tender-paw Twister
- Michigan's Adventure: Beagle Scout Acres, Beagle Scout Lookout, Camp Bus, Peanuts Trailblazers, Pig Pens Mud Buggies, Woodstock Express
