= Planet Snoopy =

Peanuts-themed area at Six Flags parks

- Theme: Peanuts

Current: 8 Six Flags and Enchanted Parks parks Former: 1 Six Flags park

Planet Snoopy is a Peanuts-themed area at several Six Flags and Enchanted Parks amusement parks. All of them originally opened when the parks were owned by Cedar Fair, prior to Cedar Fair's merger with Six Flags in 2024. On November 6, 2026, Six Flags announced that California’s Great America would be permanently closing on September 6, 2027.

== Locations ==
=== Current ===
Park	Opening date	Replaced	Rides
California's Great America	March 28, 2010	Nickelodeon Central (in 2010) & KidZville (in 2015)	15
Canada's Wonderland	May 1, 2010	Nickelodeon Central (in 2010) & The Happy Land of Hanna-Barbera (in 2010)	15
Cedar Point	May 12, 2008	Peanuts Playground	8
Dorney Park & Wildwater Kingdom	May 4, 2011	Camp Snoopy	16
Kings Dominion	April 2, 2010	Nickelodeon Central (in 2010) & KidZville (in 2013)	18
Kings Island	April 17, 2010	Nickelodeon Universe	15
Valleyfair	May 14, 2011	KidWorks	18
Worlds of Fun	April 16, 2011	Camp Snoopy	16

Planet Snoopy at Kings Island was awarded the "Best Kids Area" Golden Ticket Awards from 2001 to 2018 by Amusement Today. It was the largest Planet Snoopy in the Six Flags chain until 2013 when Kings Dominions expanded theirs to 14 acres (5.7 ha).

=== Former ===
Park	Opening date	Replaced	Replacement
Carowinds	March 27, 2010	Nickelodeon Central	Camp Snoopy

== Rides ==
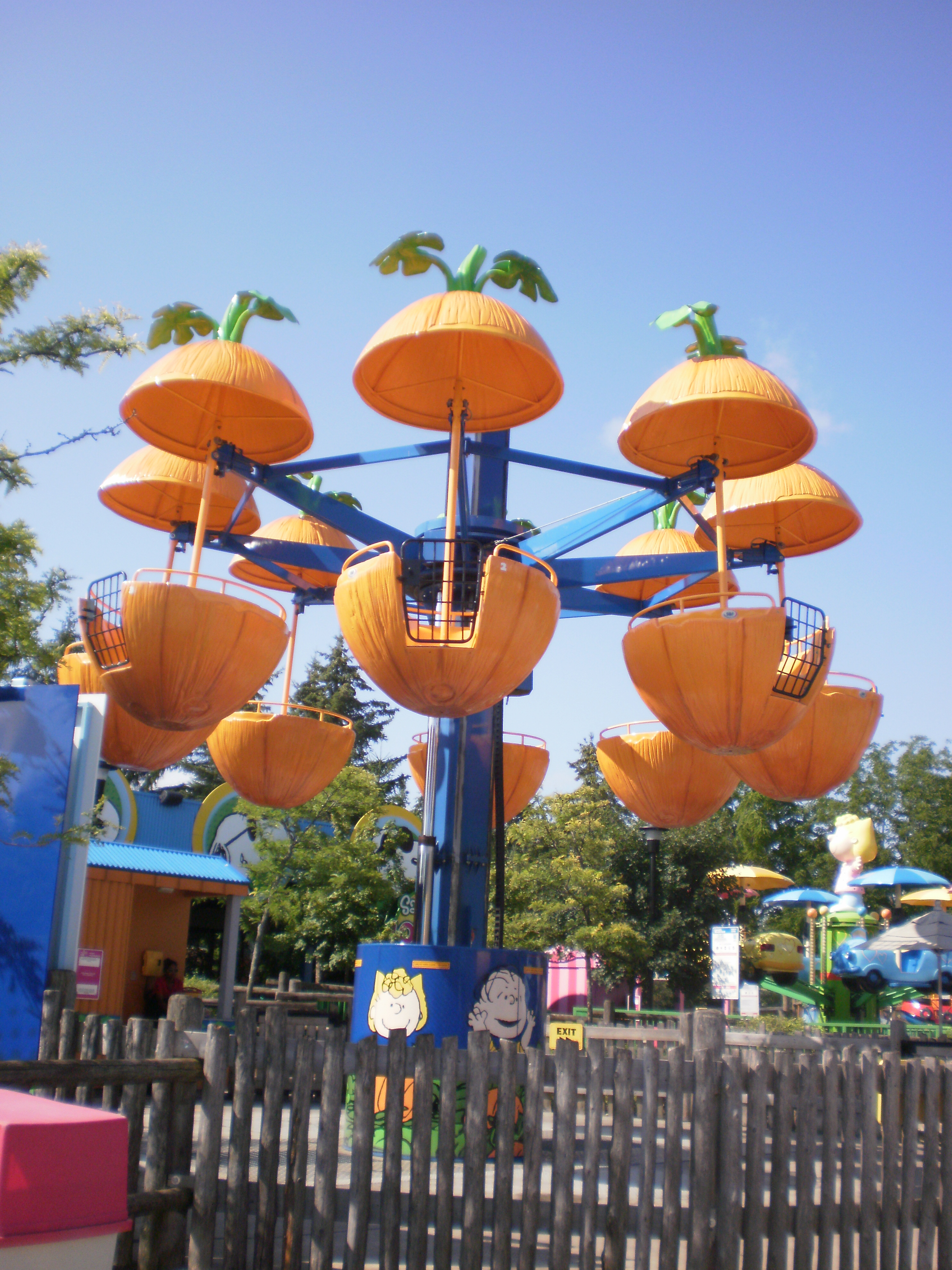
The Pumpkin Patch ride at Canada's Wonderland

- California's Great America: Character Carousel, Flying Ace, GR8 SK8, Joe Cool's Dodgem School, Kite-Eating Tree, Lucy's Crabbie Cabbies, PEANUTS 500, PEANUTS Pirates, Planet Snoopy Construction Zone, Sally's Love Buggies, Sally's Swing Set, Snoopy's Space Buggies, Snoopy's Space Race, The Pumpkin Patch, Woodstock Express
- Canada's Wonderland: Beagle Brigade Airfield, Boo Blasters on Boo Hill, Character Carousel, Ghoster Coaster, Joe Cool's Dodgem School, Lucy's Tugboat, PEANUTS 500, Sally's Love Buggies, Snoopy vs. Red Baron, Snoopy's Racing Railway, Snoopy's Revolution, Snoopy's Space Race, Swan Lake, The Pumpkin Patch, Woodstock Whirlybirds
- Cedar Point: Flying Ace Balloon Race, Joe Cool's Dodgem School, Kite-Eating Tree, PEANUTS Road Rally, Snoopy's Deep Sea Divers, Snoopy's Space Race, Snoopy's Express Railroad, Woodstock Whirlybirds
- Dorney Park & Wildwater Kingdom: Camp Bus, Charlie Brown's Wind-Up, Flying Ace, Flying Ace Balloon Race, Kite-Eating Tree, Linus Launcher, PEANUTS 500, PEANUTS Road Rally, Sally's Swing Set, Snoopy's Cloud Climbers, Snoopy's Junction, Snoopy's Rocket Express, Woodstock Express, Woodstock Whirlybirds, Woodstock's Wagon Wheel
- Kings Dominion: Boo Blasters on Boo Hill, Charlie Brown's Wind-Up, Flying Ace, Flying Ace Balloon Race, Great Pumpkin Coaster, Kite-Eating Tree, Linus Launcher, Lucy's Crabbie Cabbies, Lucy's Tugboat, PEANUTS 500, PEANUTS Turnpike, Sally's Sea Plane, Snoopy vs. Red Baron, Snoopy's Junction, Snoopy's Rocket Express, Snoopy's Space Buggies, Woodstock Express, Woodstock Whirlybirds
- Kings Island: Character Carousel, Charlie Brown's Wind-Up, Joe Cool's Dodgem School, Kite-Eating Tree, Linus’ Beetle Bugs, PEANUTS 500, Peanuts Off-Road Rally, Sally's Sea Plane, Snoopy vs. Red Baron, Snoopy's Junction, Snoopy's Space Buggies, Surf Dog, The Great Pumpkin Coaster, Woodstock Express, Woodstock Whirlybirds
- Valleyfair: Charlie Brown's Wind-Up, Cosmic Coaster, Flying Ace Balloon Race, Kite-Eating Tree, Linus Launcher, Linus’ Beetle Bugs, Lucy's Tugboat, PEANUTS 500, PEANUTS Playhouse, PEANUTS Road Rally, Sally's Swing Set, Snoopy vs. Red Baron, Snoopy's Deep Sea Divers, Snoopy's Rocket Express, Woodstock Whirlybirds
- Worlds of Fun: Beagle Brigade Airfield, Camp Bus, Charlie Brown's Wind-Up, Flying Ace Balloon Race, Kite-Eating Tree, Linus’ Launcher, Lucy's Tugboat, PEANUTS 500, PEANUTS Playhouse, PEANUTS Road Rally, Sally's Swing Set, Snoopy vs. Red Baron, Snoopy's Junction, Snoopy's Space Buggies, Woodstock Gliders, Woodstock Whirlybirds

== See also ==
- 2013 in amusement parks
