= Sandy's Blasting Bronco =

Launched roller coaster

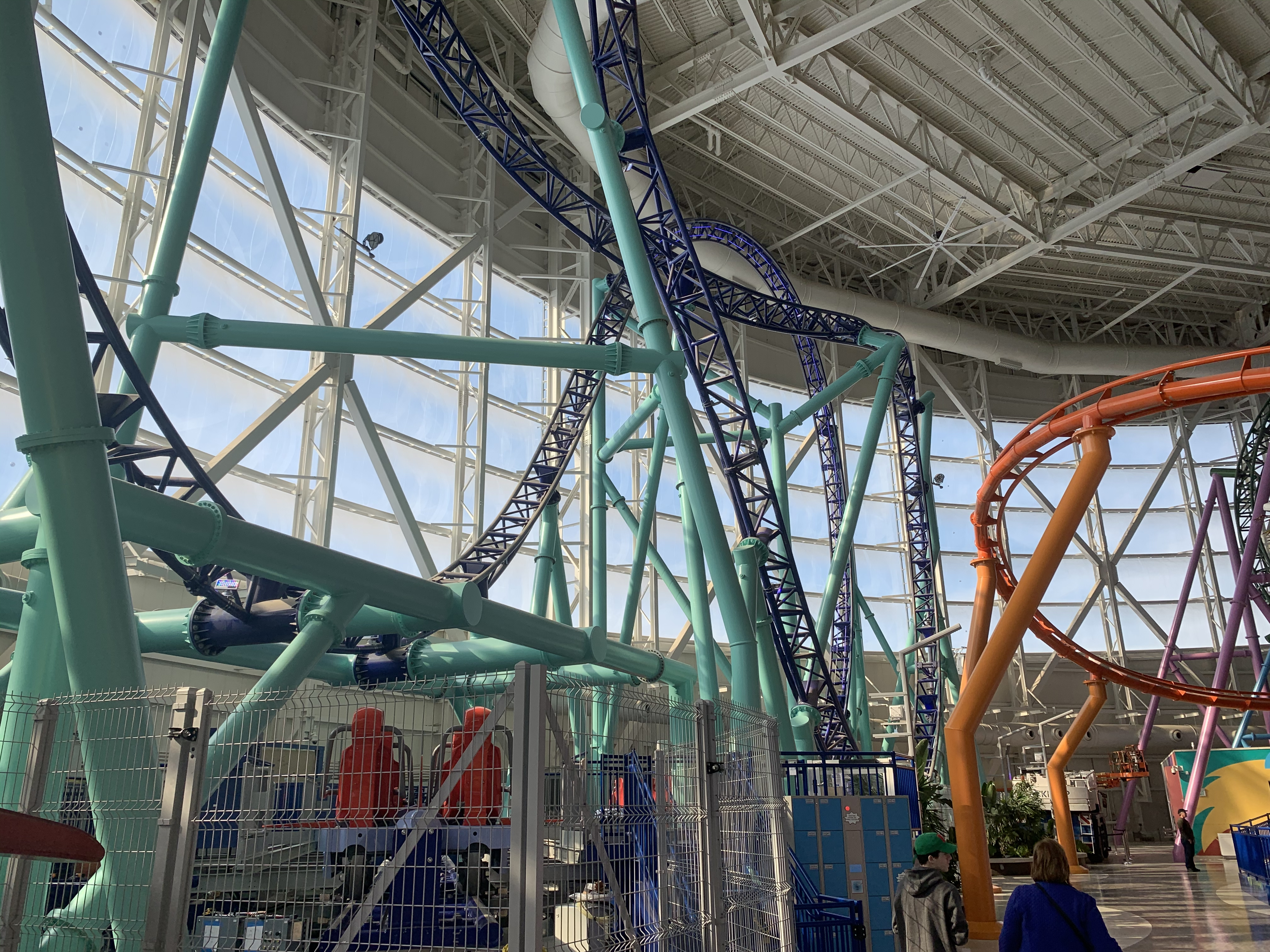

Nickelodeon Universe
- Location: Nickelodeon Universe
- Coordinates: 40.805561°N 74.070987°W
- Status: Operating
- Opening date: October 1, 2020; 4 years ago

General statistics
- Type: Steel – Launched – Indoor
- Manufacturer: Intamin
- Lift/launch system: LSM launch
- Height: 85.3 ft (26.0 m)
- Length: 1,607.6 ft (490.0 m)
- Speed: 47.8 mph (76.9 km/h)
- Inversions: 4
- Duration: 1:40
- Height restriction: 52 in (132 cm)
- Trains: Single train with 3 cars. Riders are arranged 2 across in 2 rows for a total of 12 riders per train.
- Sandy's Blasting Bronco at RCDB

Sandy's Blasting Bronco is a compact steel launched roller coaster at Nickelodeon Universe amusement park, within the American Dream Meadowlands shopping and entertainment complex, at the Meadowlands Sports Complex in East Rutherford, New Jersey, United States. The coaster is located indoors and launches riders both forwards and backwards through a compact layout.

== History ==
In September 2016, following Triple Five's takeover of the project five years earlier, officials at the long-delayed American Dream Meadowlands shopping mall announced that the Nickelodeon Universe theme park would be built within the mall. Concept artwork from as early as November 2017 showed the then-unnamed compact launch coaster located at the back of the park, and in January 2019, construction company Ride Entertainment Group would share images of the coaster layout. On February 2, 2019, American Dream officials held a press conference at the ACE EastCoaster event at Hersheypark in Hershey, Pennsylvania, where four of the park's coasters were revealed. Sandy's Blasting Bronco was revealed to be the name of the coaster, presumably tying in with the SpongeBob SquarePants character Sandy Cheeks.

Although the Nickelodeon Universe Theme Park would open to the public on October 25, 2019, Sandy's Blasting Bronco would not open until nearly a year later. It was initially among a group of rides that had not yet been certified by the New Jersey Department of Community Affairs as ready to operate. Speculation on the cause(s) would ensue for several months, with various unverified reports and rumors attempting to explain its delayed opening until the park was forced to shut down in March due to the emerging COVID-19 pandemic. With no reopening date for the American Dream mall set by summer 2020, as well as various reports of financial trouble from Triple Five, the mall's future was brought into question, and a possibility of the complex not reopening became widely discussed.

In August 2020, Triple Five struck an agreement with lenders in order to avoid foreclosure on the Mall of America, thus aiding in keeping the American Dream mall, and Nickelodeon Universe afloat. After State Governor Phil Murphy green-lit the reopening of indoor amusement parks, Nickelodeon Universe reopened on October 1, 2020. Sandy's Blasting Bronco, as reported for some time previously, opened with the park and began regular operations for the public.

== Characteristics ==
=== Ride experience ===
The train is immediately launched out of the station, hitting a top speed of 47.8 mph (76.9 km/h). The train quickly navigates a back-to-back pair of Immelmann inversions. The train exits into a final Roll over (two inversions) before coming to a complete stop in the station. The turntable station then proceeds to spin the train a full 180° around, facing the train backwards. The train then goes for its second lap, navigating the launch and layout once again, although with the riders facing backwards. Once the train has returned to the station, the turntable once again rotates the train into a forwards-facing position, and riders then unboard.

=== Statistics ===
Sandy's Blasting Bronco packs 4 inversions and 1,607.6-foot (490.0 m) of track into an extremely compact site, where it stands as tall as 85.3-foot (26.0 m). The ride is powered by a Linear Synchronous Motor (LSM) launch, which can send riders into a top speed of 47.8 mph (76.9 km/h), whether the train is positioned forwards or backwards. The station platform also doubles as a turntable, which can rotate the train to take the layout both facing forwards and backwards. It can also lead to a maintenance track designated for the attraction's single 12 passenger train.

Sandy's Blasting Bronco was designed and manufactured by Liechtenstein-based Swiss manufacturer Intamin, and is the first installation of their recent Vertical LSM Model. It is the first Intamin product to feature a track lighting package from Iowa based KCL Engineering, who had installed similar, extravagant packages on various Gerstlauer coasters, including the neighboring TMNT Shellraiser. The Monster, TMNT Shellraiser and subsequent rides lighting system's originator and designer, Mike Lambert, was recognized with (2) Illuminating Engineering Society (IES) Illumination Awards for Innovation in Design.
