= SpongeBob SquarePants Rock Bottom Plunge =

Gerstlauer Euro-Fighter roller coaster

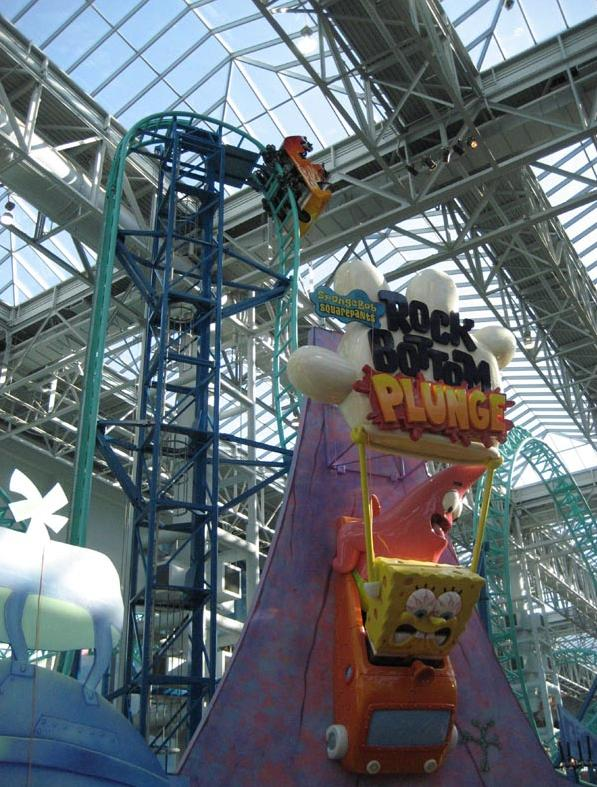
- SpongeBob SquarePants Rock Bottom Plunge

Nickelodeon Universe
- Location: Nickelodeon Universe
- Coordinates: 44.8553°N 93.2425°W
- Status: Operating
- Opening date: March 15, 2008
- Cost: $2,500,000
- Replaced: The Mystery Mine Ride, SpongeBob SquarePants 4-D, The Funtastic World Of Hanna-Barbera (ride)

General statistics
- Type: Steel – Euro-Fighter – Indoor
- Manufacturer: Gerstlauer
- Designer: Werner Stengel
- Model: Euro-Fighter (Custom)
- Track layout: Compact
- Lift/launch system: Vertical Chain lift
- Height: 74.5 ft (22.7 m)
- Length: 1,371.4 ft (418.0 m)
- Speed: 43.5 mph (70.0 km/h)
- Inversions: 2
- Duration: 2:00
- Max vertical angle: 97°
- Capacity: 750 riders per hour
- G-force: 4.4
- Height restriction: 48 in (122 cm)
- Trains: Several trains with a single car. Riders are arranged 4 across in 2 rows for a total of 8 riders per train.
- SpongeBob SquarePants Rock Bottom Plunge at RCDB

SpongeBob SquarePants Rock Bottom Plunge is a Gerstlauer Euro-Fighter roller coaster located at Nickelodeon Universe in the Mall of America, Bloomington, Minnesota. Standing 74.5 feet tall, it is the tallest roller coaster in the park. It also features a beyond vertical (97 degrees) drop. It is the first roller coaster themed to SpongeBob SquarePants, and opened with the Nickelodeon Universe grand opening on March 15, 2008. The ride features a vertical loop, and a heartline roll. The ride was installed by Ride Entertainment Group, which handles all of Gerstlauer's operations in the Western Hemisphere.

== Ride experience ==
The ride, starting partway up the lift hill and running until it is obscured by a wall as it returns to the station

The ride vehicles exit the boarding station by turning to the left and climb the 67 foot tall lift hill. Guests then "plunge" down the past-vertical drop at 97 degrees, and ride through: a vertical loop at 40 miles per hour, speed hill, cutback overbank turn, heartline roll, mid-course brake run, overbank helix, an additional brake run, then finally return to the boarding station.

== History ==
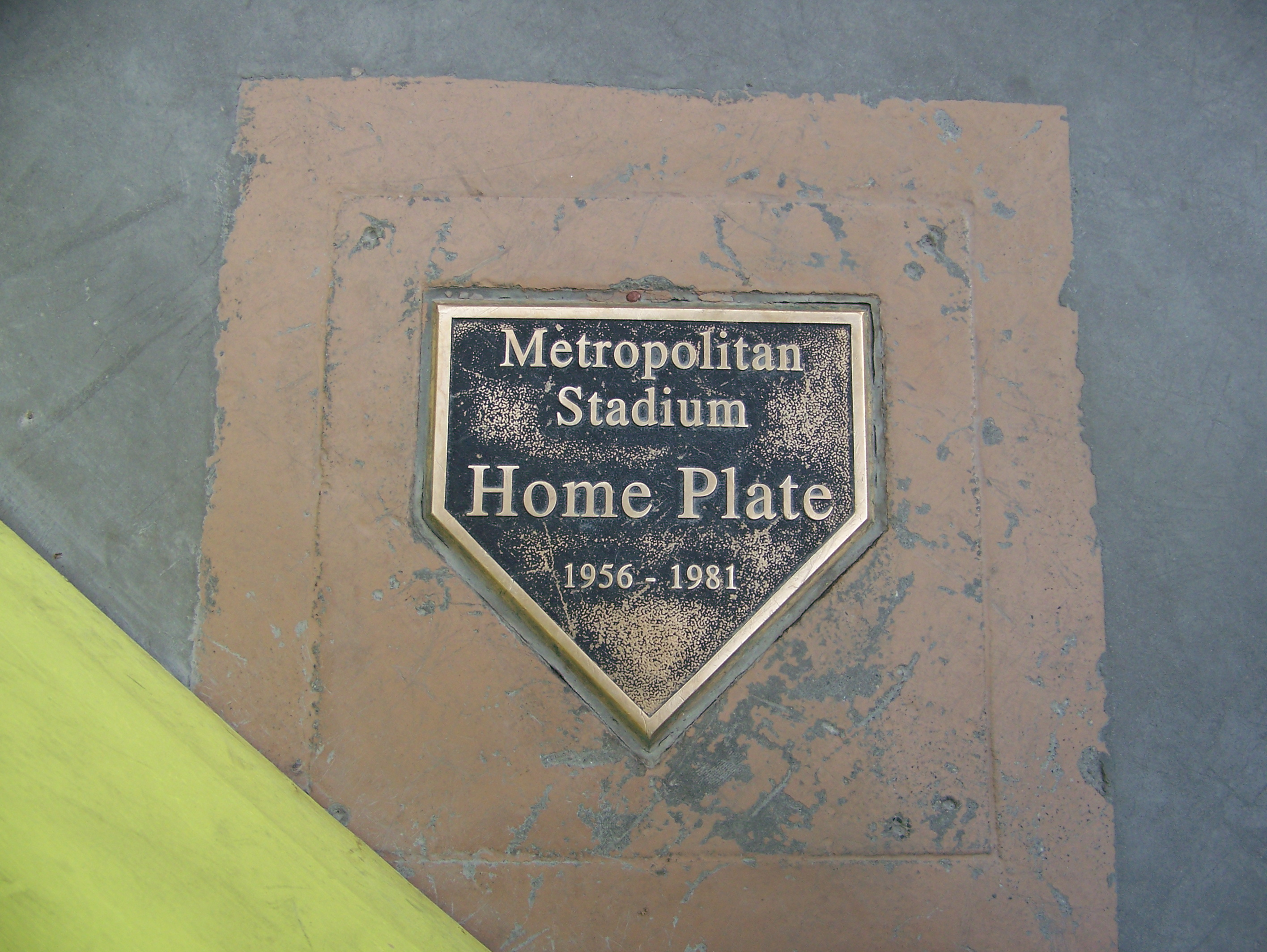
The home plate plaque in Nickelodeon Universe

In 2007, the ride replaced Camp Snoopy's Mystery Mine attraction which housed the SpongeBob SquarePants 4-D ride and The Funtastic World of Hanna-Barbera ride (under the name of Yogi's Big Rescue). Concept artwork for the ride was revealed to the public via the theme park's construction walls in 2007. The ride is based on the SpongeBob SquarePants episode "Rock Bottom", and features a prominently placed statue of SpongeBob and Patrick riding an orange bus down a 90-degree angle while holding a glove over his head. Design and fabrication for the giant statue was handled by Tivolitoo, a company that Nickelodeon Experience Design often collaborates with.

Mall of America and its Camp Snoopy theme park were built upon the former site of the Metropolitan Stadium, and a plaque was installed at the previous location of the stadium's home plate. This plaque was kept intact during the theme park's conversion to its Nickelodeon re-theming, and now sits outside the entrance of Rock Bottom Plunge.

On June 23, 2016, the guests who rode in the attraction's 1 millionth coaster ride were given 1 million free rides to the theme park and were the inaugural inductees into the "1 Million Ride Club".

A similarly structured Gerstlauer-produced Euro-Fighter rollercoaster, TMNT Shellraiser, opened at American Dream Meadowland's Nickelodeon Universe theme park in 2019. This ride also features a vertical plunge, with an even steeper drop of 121.5 degrees.

Unknown	World's steepest roller coaster March 15, 2008 – July 5, 2008; 97°	Succeeded by Steel Hawg; 111°
