= Rock Bottom (SpongeBob SquarePants) =

- SpongeBob SquarePants episode
- Title card
- Episode no.: Season 1 Episode 17b
- Directed by: Nick Jennings (art); Tom Yasumi (animation); Paul Tibbitt (storyboard); Ennio Torresan (storyboard); Alan Smart (supervising)
- Written by: Paul Tibbitt; Ennio Torresan; David Fain
- Production code: 2515-138
- Original air date: March 15, 2000

Episode chronology
← Previous "Arrgh!"	Next → "Texas"
- SpongeBob SquarePants (season 1)

"Rock Bottom" is the second segment of the 17th episode of the first season of the American animated television series SpongeBob SquarePants. It first aired on Nickelodeon in the United States on March 15, 2000. In this episode, SpongeBob gets stranded in Rock Bottom, a strange city in the abyssopelagic zone.

The episode was written by Paul Tibbitt, Ennio Torresan, and David Fain, and the animation was directed by Tom Yasumi. The premise of the episode was inspired by a childhood incident from series writer and voice of Plankton, Mr. Lawrence, wherein he got on to the wrong bus on his way back from school. The idea was simple enough for the storyboarders to create most of the gags and humor.

Upon release, "Rock Bottom" was viewed by over two million households. It has received positive reviews from critics, and is widely regarded as one of the best SpongeBob episodes. The episode inspired the SpongeBob SquarePants Rock Bottom Plunge ride which opened in 2008 at Mall of America's Nickelodeon Universe. It also inspired levels in several SpongeBob video games.

== Plot ==
Boarding a bus home from Glove World, a glove-themed amusement park, SpongeBob and Patrick accidentally board the wrong bus, which takes them down a 90-degree cliff to Rock Bottom, a town inhabited by many strange deep-sea animals. Patrick is frightened, so SpongeBob leaves him at the bus stop while he goes to get a bus schedule. As soon as SpongeBob leaves, the next bus to Bikini Bottom arrives, and Patrick leaves SpongeBob behind. Unable to climb the 90-degree cliff, SpongeBob waits for the next bus.

After a number of mishaps prevent him boarding a bus, SpongeBob heads to a bus station and waits in a very long line. Reaching the front, he finds that the next bus leaves in 5 seconds; he misses it and learns it was the last one until morning. As the lights go out for the night, SpongeBob hears a noise and dashes back to the cliff in terror. The source of the noise is revealed to be a friendly anglerfish, who has retrieved SpongeBob's glove balloon. The anglerfish inflates the balloon and ties it to SpongeBob's wrist, allowing him to float up the cliff. Believing that SpongeBob is still stuck in Rock Bottom, Patrick boards a bus and heads down the cliff to fetch him. SpongeBob spots him on the way up, but leaves Patrick on his own as to not get stuck again.

== Production ==
"Rock Bottom" was written by Paul Tibbitt, Ennio Torresan, and David Fain, with Tom Yasumi serving as animation director. Tibbitt and Torresan also worked as storyboard directors. The premise of the episode was inspired by an incident from series writer and voice of Plankton, Mr. Lawrence's childhood of hopping onto the wrong bus on his way back from elementary school. Though the experience lasted for a short time, he described it as a traumatic one for his young self and felt it to be one a lot of other children could relate to, despite Lawrence not being literally stranded like in the episode. Series head writer of the first season Merriwether Williams described the episode as one of the series' best, and one with a simple story. She said "it stayed with one idea" and was "so small that you could explore gags and opportunities for gags." The episode was an example of "a good outline" in the series where the storyboards and humor were done easily. Williams said that in "many ways, my job was to create situations where the board guys could be funny, to create a situation that could be funny, and let them go for the actual, specific jokes."

== Broadcast and reception ==
"Rock Bottom" originally aired on Nickelodeon in the United States on March 15, 2000, and was watched by 2.1 million households upon its release. The episode has largely received positive reception from critics and fans alike. As of 2022, the episode alongside its accompanying segment, "Arrgh!", rank No. 9 in the highest rated SpongeBob SquarePants according to IMDb.

In 2011, Emily Estep of WeGotThisCovered.com ranked the episode No. 5 on her "Top 10 Episodes of SpongeBob SquarePants" list. She said "While 'Rock Bottom' is mostly a goofy episode, it's also one of the scarier episodes of SpongeBob." She added that the episode had "the ideal balance of cuteness and sheer terror" that made it very memorable. In 2021, Jordan Moreau, Katcy Stephan and David Viramontes of Variety ranked the episode No. 14 on their 15 best SpongeBob episodes list. They noted how the episode flips the usual dynamics of SpongeBob annoying people around him by putting SpongeBob in a setting weirder than him. In 2024, Andrew Firriolo of BuzzFeed ranked the episode No. 4 in their 25 Best SpongeBob episodes list. They highlighted the episode's writing and relatability factor (in the form of boarding the wrong bus) as positives. In 2025, Mike Bedard of /Film ranked the episode No. 10 in their 15 Best SpongeBob episodes list. The writer praised the episode's abundance of great jokes and commemorated its memorability due to a scary atmosphere and SpongeBob being placed in an unusually terrifying situation.

"Rock Bottom" is notable among SpongeBob fans and critics as one of the series' scarier episodes. In 2023, Guillermo Kurten, Fawzia Khan, and Robbie Robinson of CBR, ranked it No. 10 in their 20 Darkest SpongeBob episodes list. They pointed out that the episode's tone and setting, Rock Bottom, darkly contrasted with that of most of the regular series and its main location, Bikini Bottom. They also commented that the episode might host some commentary on mental health in the "hints of depression and anxiety SpongeBob feels in desperately trying to escape from his literal — and metaphorical — 'Rock Bottom.'" In 2023, J.S. Gornael of Collider ranked the episode No. 2 in their 10 Darkest SpongeBob episodes list. They praised the episodes dark and dimly lit atmosphere, creepy residents of the title town, and Tom Kenny's voice acting for effectively creating a chilling experience.

== Home media ==
"Rock Bottom" was released on the DVD compilation called The Best of SpongeBob SquarePants on May 11, 2004. It was also included on the SpongeBob SquarePants: The Complete 1st Season DVD, released on October 28, 2003. On September 22, 2009, the episode was released on the SpongeBob SquarePants: The First 100 Episodes DVD, alongside all the episodes of seasons one through five.

== Legacy ==
=== Amusement park ride ===
"Rock Bottom" served as an inspiration for the SpongeBob SquarePants Rock Bottom Plunge ride. The ride first opened on March 15, 2008, at the Mall of America's Nickelodeon theme park re-branded from the Mall of America's Park at MOA, formerly Camp Snoopy, to Nickelodeon Universe in the Minneapolis-St. Paul suburb of Bloomington, Minnesota.

The SpongeBob SquarePants Rock Bottom Plunge features vertical lifts and 90-degree turns providing the riders a 60-plus foot drop, a maximum speed of over 40 miles per hour and a 4.4 maximum G-force rating. The ride time is approximately two minutes and is the shortest Gerstlauer roller coaster built yet.

=== Video games ===
Levels inspired and based on the titular setting of the episode have featured in several SpongeBob games such as Employee of the Month (2002), Battle for Bikini Bottom (2003), and The Yellow Avenger (2005). A Halloween-themed version of Rock Bottom appears in The Cosmic Shake (2023). One of the most famous gags from the episode, where SpongeBob is repeatedly shafted by the bus at a nearby stop, is incorporated as an easter egg within both Battle for Bikini Bottom and The Cosmic Shake.
