= Nickelodeon Slime Streak =

Indoor roller coaster at Nickelodeon Universe at American Dream Meadowlands

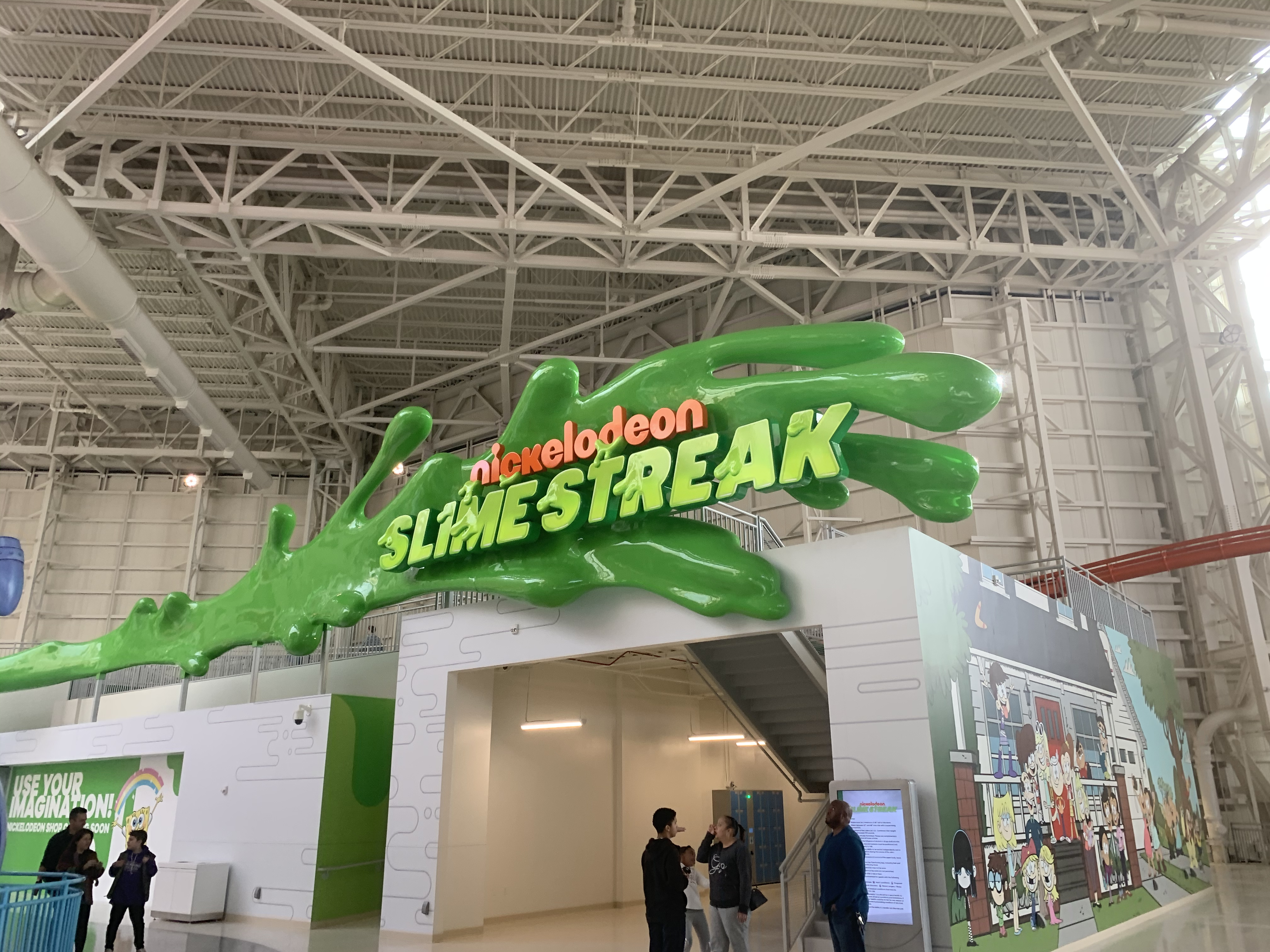

Nickelodeon Universe
- Location: Nickelodeon Universe
- Coordinates: 40.806093°N 74.070553°W
- Status: Operating
- Opening date: October 25, 2019; 6 years ago

General statistics
- Type: Steel – Family – Indoor
- Manufacturer: Chance Rides
- Designer: Joe Draves
- Model: Big Dipper
- Lift/launch system: Drive tire
- Height: 70 ft (21 m)
- Length: 1,263 ft (385 m)
- Speed: 37 mph (60 km/h)
- Inversions: 0
- Duration: 1:10
- Capacity: 550 riders per hour
- G-force: 2.5
- Height restriction: 42 in (107 cm)
- Trains: Single train with 5 cars; riders arranged 2 across in 2 rows for a total of 20 riders per train
- Nickelodeon Slime Streak at RCDB

Nickelodeon Slime Streak is a steel family roller coaster located in the Nickelodeon Universe Theme Park at the American Dream Meadowlands megamall in East Rutherford, New Jersey. The coaster opened for the park's grand opening on October 25, 2019, and is primarily targeted at children and younger audiences.

== History ==
In September 2016, following Triple Five's takeover of the project five years earlier, officials at the long-delayed American Dream Meadowlands shopping mall announced that the Nickelodeon Universe theme park would be built within the mall. The coaster could be found in park concept artwork from as early as November 2017, and a train for the then-unannounced ride was placed on display at the Chance Rides booth at the IAAPA Expo in November 2018.

Construction was well under way throughout 2018/2019, and on February 2, 2019, American Dream officials held a press conference at the ACE EastCoaster event at Hersheypark in Hershey, Pennsylvania, where four of the park's coasters were revealed. reportedly due to the coaster's interactions with the park's Sky Ride and other attractions. Nickelodeon Slime Streak was revealed to be the name of the coaster, where blueprints and detailed statistics of the attraction were presented, with the ride being themed after the brand's trademark slime.

Nickelodeon Slime Streak began public operations on October 25, 2019 - the park's grand opening - with New Jersey Governor Phil Murphy and Triple Five President Don Ghermezian in attendance. Amid shortages of operational rides, Slime Streak was only one of two roller coasters in the park that actually opened that day; the other was the TMNT Shellraiser, and the park's remaining three coasters began public operations at later dates.

== Characteristics ==
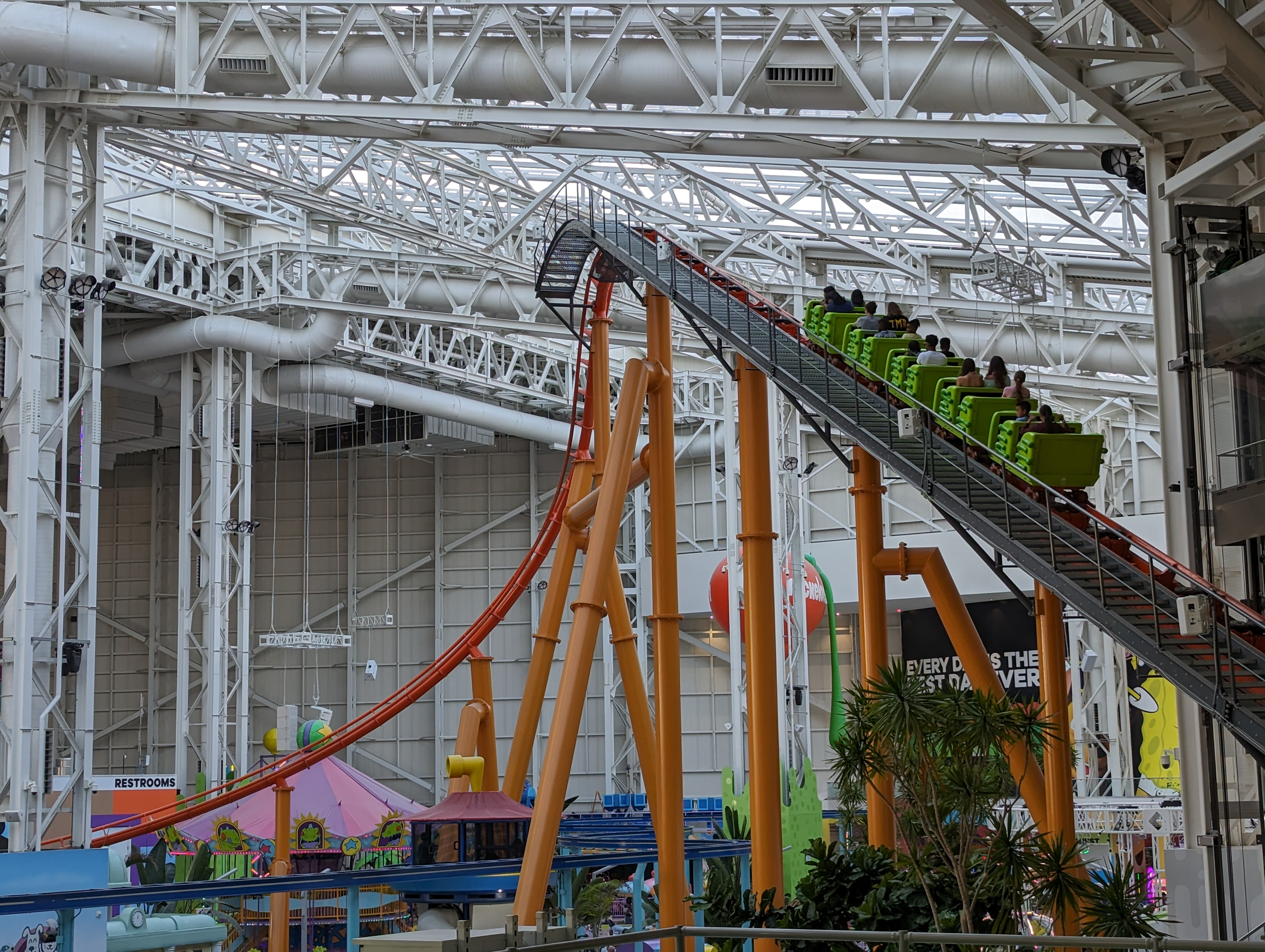
A train climbing the lift hill

=== Ride experience ===
Riders dispatch the station and make a slight turn, the proceeding to ascend the Lift hill. At the top of the coaster's 70-foot (21 m) peak, the ride drops down into a curved drop and up into an airtime hill. Riders proceed through a short series of airtime hills and turns, followed by a helix around the Jimmy Neutron's Atomic Smasher attraction. The ride passes directly overhead Timmy's Halfpipe Havoc, navigates a few smaller airtime bumps, and enters the brake run, thus returning to the station. The ride lasts approximately 70 seconds.

=== Statistics ===
Nickelodeon Slime Streak has a track length of 1,263 feet (385 m), a peak height of 70 feet (21 m), and can attain a top speed of 37 mph (60 km/h). Despite the height, the coaster's station is on a platform 12 feet (3.7 m) off of the ground, and has a total elevation change of 50 feet (15 m) throughout the ride. The coaster's layout features 10 potential airtime moments throughout the ride layout, where riders can be subjected to as little as 0.2 vertical G-forces.

The coaster is serviced by a single 20 passenger train, which is made up of five cars with two rows of two riders each, and can board anybody with a minimum height of 42 inches. The train has received criticism from roller coaster enthusiasts and larger riders over its cramped, tight nature and thin, unpadded metal lap bar restraints.

=== Model ===
Nickelodeon Slime Streak was manufactured by Chance Rides in Wichita, Kansas, and designed by rollercoaster engineer Joe Draves, who had also worked on projects such as Steel Curtain at Kennywood and Merlin's Mayhem at Dutch Wonderland. It is referred to as a Family Twister Coaster.
