= Fairly Odd Coaster =

Amusement ride

- Previously known as Timberland Twister (2004–2007)
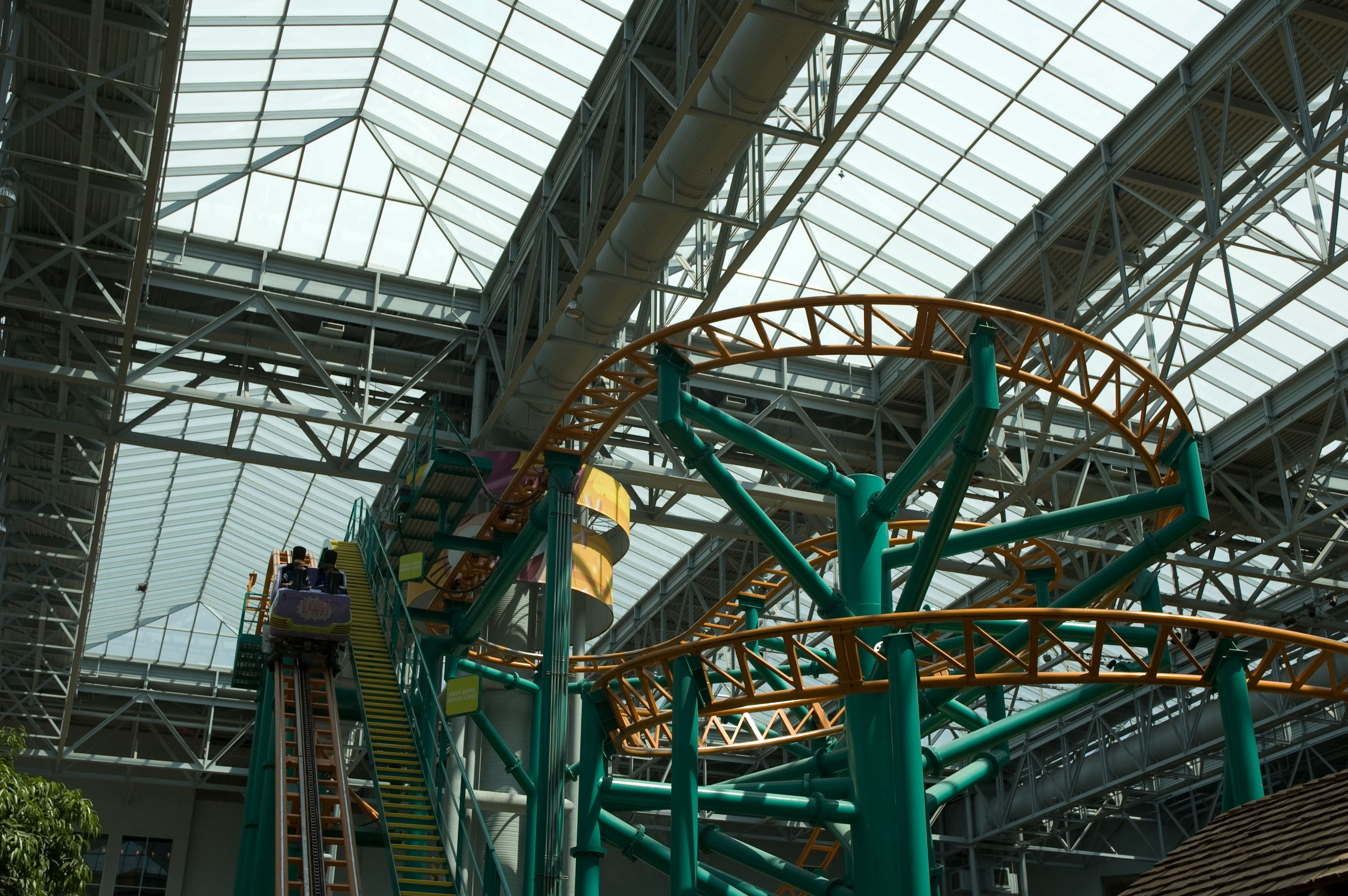
- Fairly Odd Coaster

Nickelodeon Universe
- Location: Nickelodeon Universe
- Park section: Southeast
- Coordinates: 44°51′15″N 93°14′32″W
- Status: Operating
- Opening date: March 15, 2004

General statistics
- Type: Steel – Spinning – Indoor
- Manufacturer: Gerstlauer
- Designer: Werner Stengel
- Model: Spinning Coaster Model 420/4
- Track layout: Twister
- Lift/launch system: Chain-lift
- Height: 54 ft (16 m)
- Drop: 34 ft (10 m)
- Length: 1,345 ft (410 m)
- Speed: 31 mph (50 km/h)
- Inversions: 0
- Duration: 1:30
- Max vertical angle: 50°
- Capacity: 480-720 riders per hour
- G-force: 3.2
- Height restriction: 43 in (109 cm)
- Trains: 6 trains with a single car. Riders are arranged 2 across in 2 rows for a total of 4 riders per train.
- Fairly Odd Coaster at RCDB

Fairly Odd Coaster (known formerly as Timberland Twister) is a spinning roller coaster themed around The Fairly OddParents that opened on March 15, 2004, at Nickelodeon Universe in the Mall of America. Individual cars have two rows facing each other and each car spins independently throughout the course of the ride. The ride is geared toward families. The ride was installed by Ride Entertainment Group, who handles all of Gerstlauer's operations in the Western Hemisphere.

== Ride experience ==
The ride vehicles exit the boarding station and climb a 54-foot-tall (16 m) chain lift hill. At the top, the vehicles are released and enter a series of flat tight curves to get them spinning. Guests then ride through: a set of speed-retarders, several helix turns, an additional set of speed retarders, a series of large track-hills, another set of speed retarders, and a series of fast sharp bumps. Riders then take one last tight sideways turn, and the vehicles return to the boarding station.

== History ==
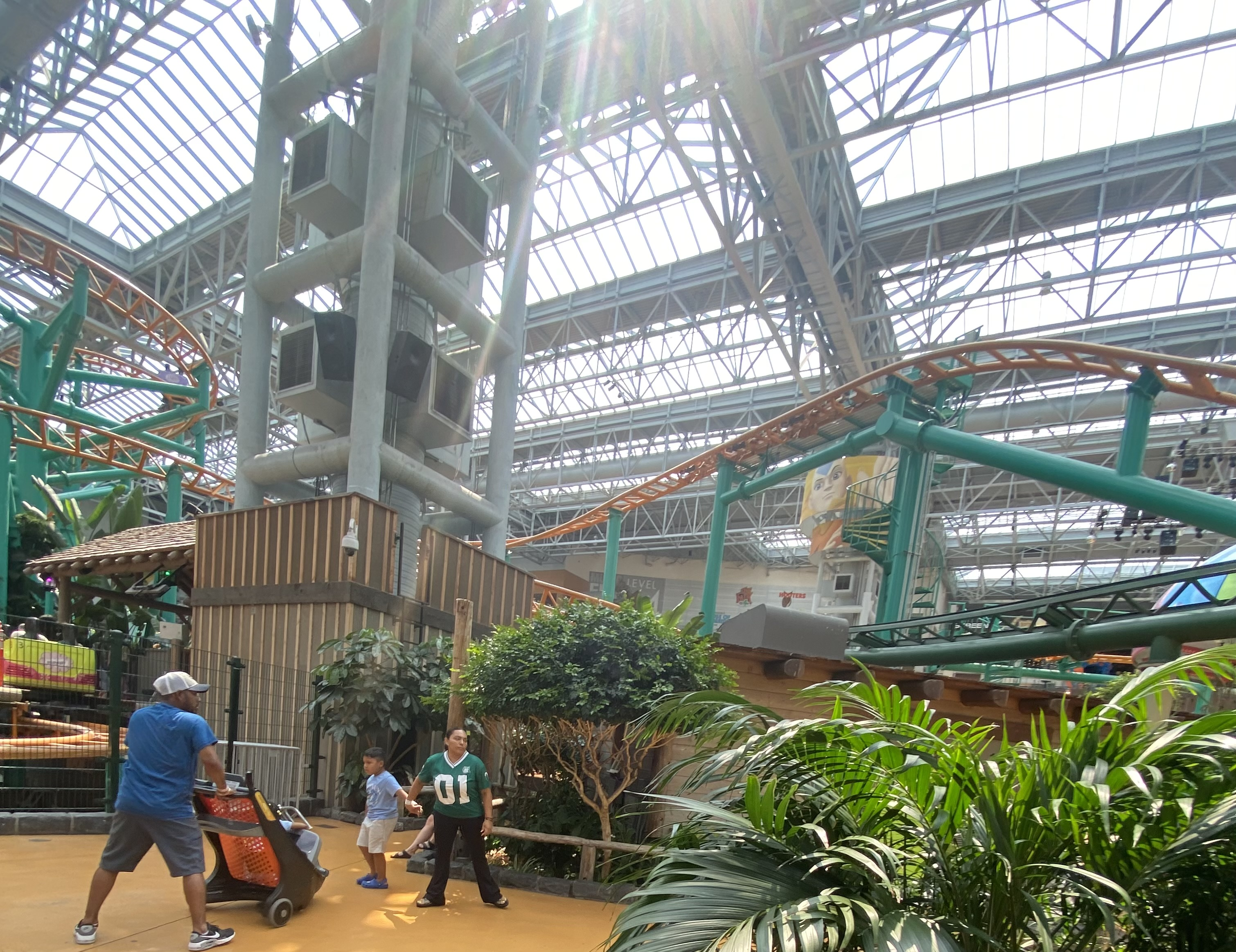
Track of Fairly Odd Coaster

Fairly Odd Coaster opened as "Timberland Twister" when the park was themed after Camp Snoopy and was the first spinning roller coaster manufactured by Gerstlauer. A month later, an identical ride opened at Worlds of Fun amusement park in Kansas City, Missouri called Spinning Dragons. A discontinued feature of Fairly Odd Coaster was an on-ride video system that allowed guests to purchase DVDs of their ride on the attraction.

The Fairly Odd Coaster name was previously shared with rollercoasters at Carowinds in Charlotte, North Carolina and Kings Island near Cincinnati, Ohio before they were both renamed and rethemed as Woodstock Express.
