= Teenage Mutant Ninja Turtles Shell Shock =

Amusement park ride

Nickelodeon Universe
- Status: Operating
- Opening date: March 17, 2012
- Replaced: Tak Attack

Ride statistics
- Manufacturer: Gerstlauer
- Model: Sky Fly
- Theme: Teenage Mutant Ninja Turtles
- Height: 72 ft (22 m)
- Speed: 25 mph (40 km/h)
- Capacity: 264lbs riders per hour
- Vehicles: 12
- Riders per vehicle: 1
- Height restriction: 48 in (122 cm)

Teenage Mutant Ninja Turtles Shell Shock is a Gerstlauer Sky Fly ride operating at Nickelodeon Universe at Mall of America in Bloomington, Minnesota. Teenage Mutant Ninja Turtles Shell Shock opened on March 17, 2012, and was the first of its kind in the United States. The ride was installed by Ride Entertainment Group, who handles all of Gerstlauer's operations in the Western Hemisphere.

== Summary ==
Riders enter through a queue themed to look like the Ninja Turtles' underground sewer headquarters before boarding the ride vehicles, which feature the turtles' shells and their weapons on the back. Once the 12 single-rider gondolas are carried up, the gondola brakes are released and guests are able to control the rotation of their vehicles. Since the boom is tilted, riders go up 72 feet (22 m) and come down each revolution around the central tower at speeds of 25 miles per hour (40 km/h).

== History ==
On July 25, 2011, the Park Thoughts podcast interviewed the marketing director of Nickelodeon Universe, and confirmed that a new major attraction was in the works for the 2012 season. On January 20, 2012, Nickelodeon Universe announced Teenage Mutant Ninja Turtles Shell Shock for the 2012 season, and was expected to open in March 2012. The attraction replaced Tak Attack, which closed on November 14, 2011.

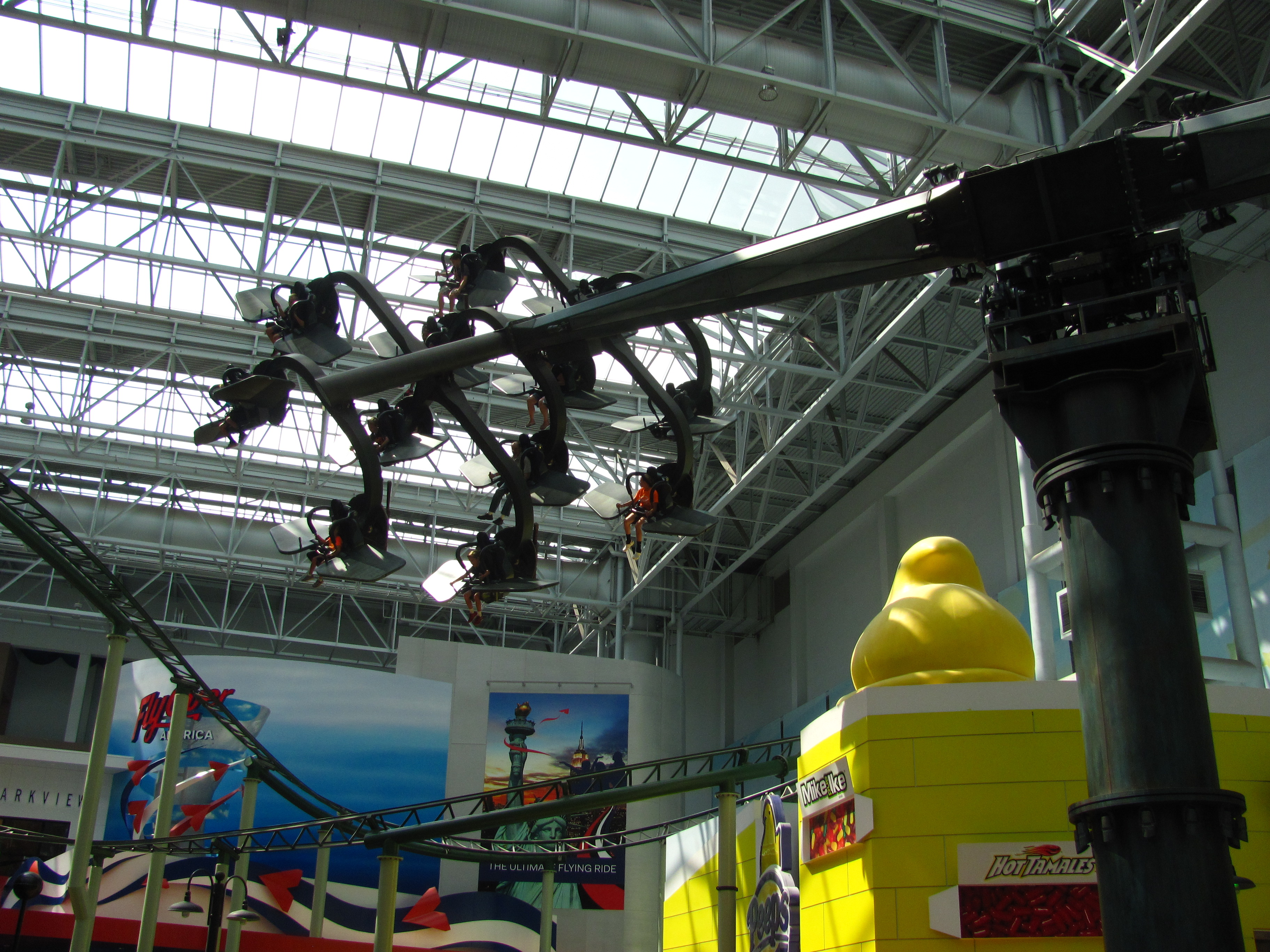
Teenage Mutant Ninja Turtles Shell Shock

On March 17, 2012, the attraction officially opened several months before the premiere of the television series that it is based upon. Nickelodeon Universe hosted a Be A Part of Turtles History at Nickelodeon Universe! event to conduct the Guinness World Record for the Largest Gathering of Ninja Turtles. The record was broken on March 17, 2012, with 836 people dressed up as Ninja Turtles in front of the ride. The previous record for the largest gathering of Ninja Turtles was set at Rutgers University in 2008 with 786 people.

== See also ==
- 2012 in amusement parks
