= Indoor roller coaster =

Roller coaster in a structure

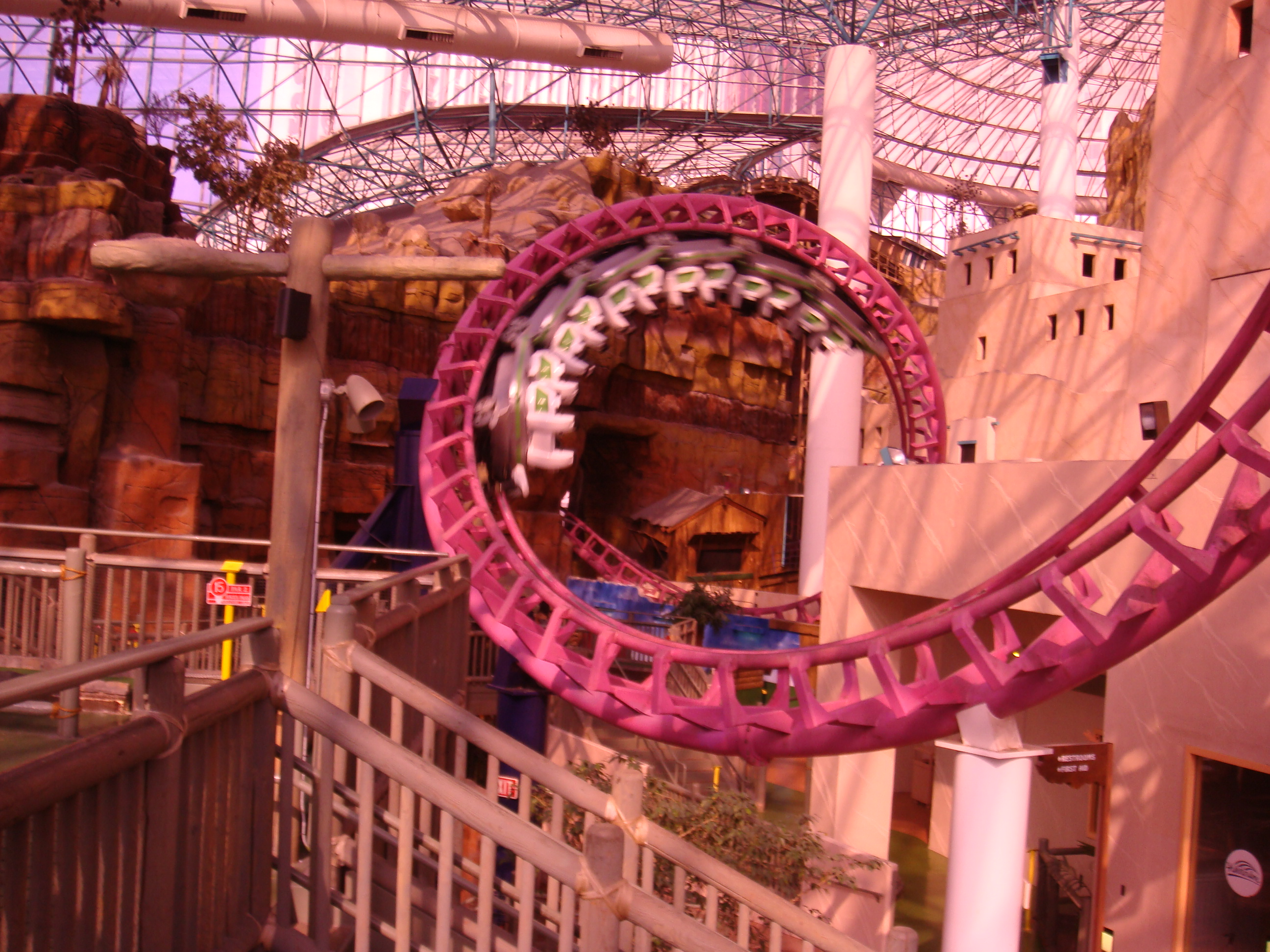
Canyon Blaster inside the Adventuredome indoor theme park in Circus Circus Hotel & Casino in Las Vegas, Nevada.

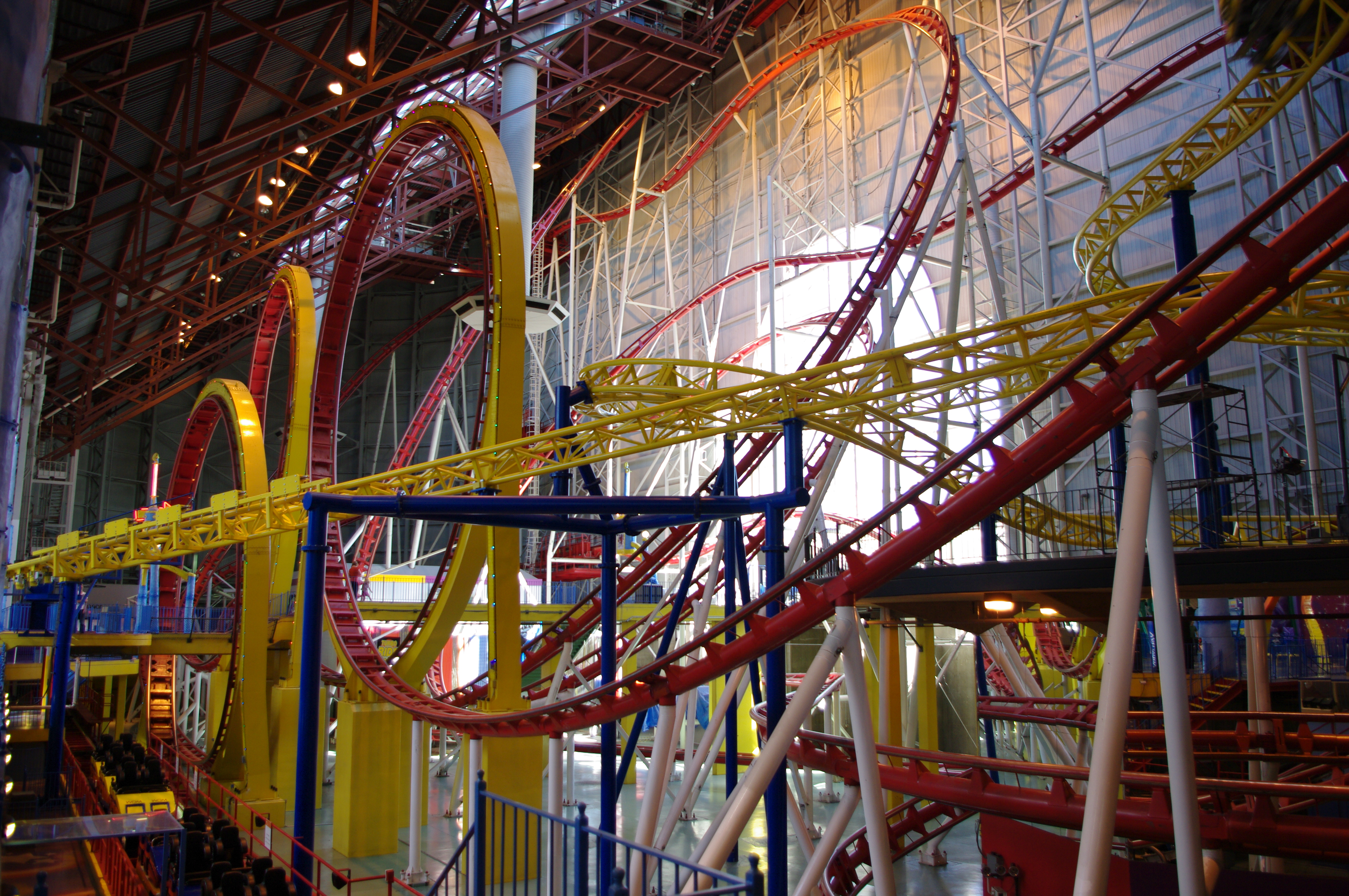
Mindbender and Galaxy Orbiter at Galaxyland in the West Edmonton Mall.

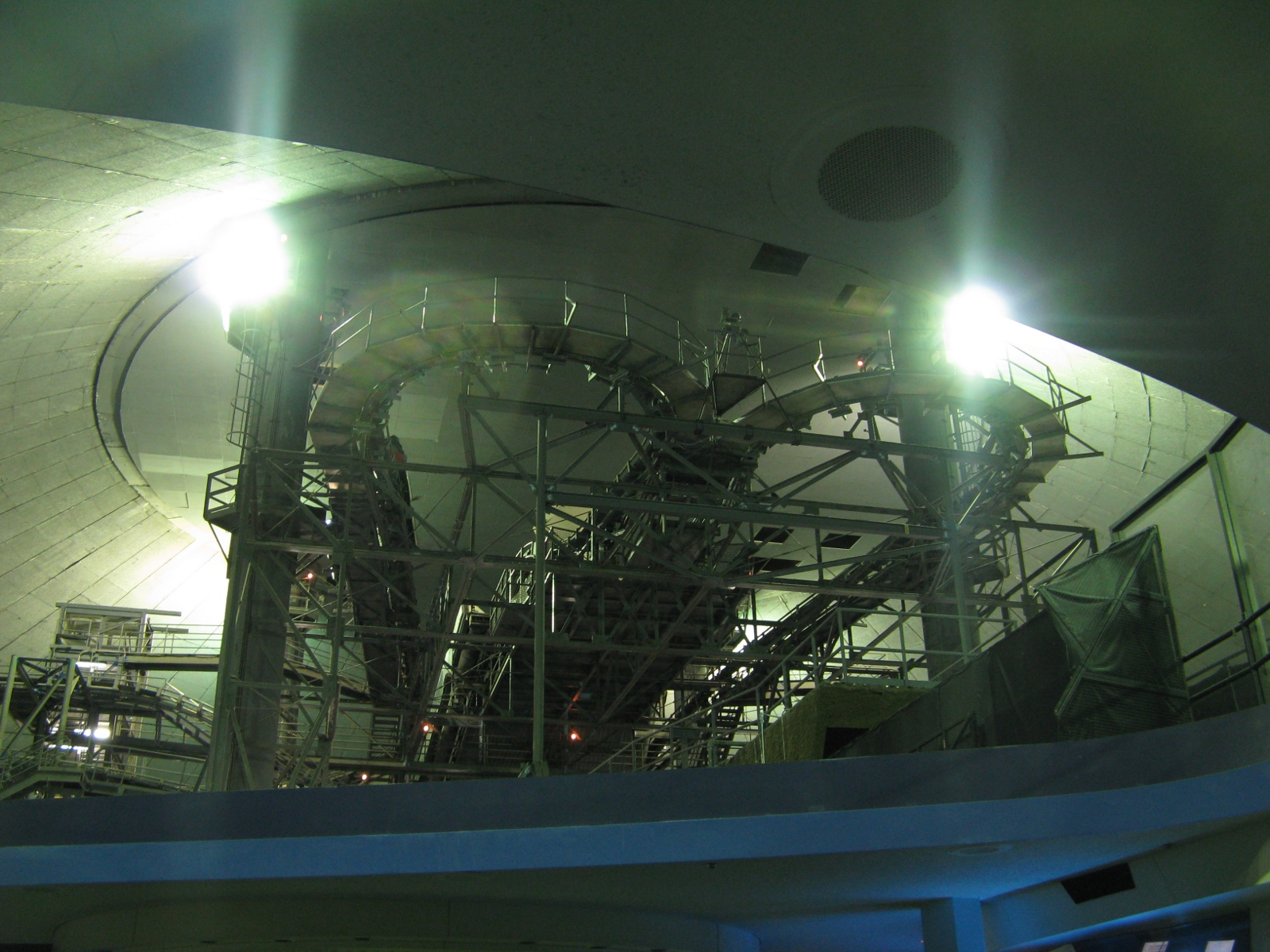
Space Mountain, in the Tomorrowland section of Magic Kingdom at Walt Disney World Resort in Orlando, Florida is one of the most well-known enclosed roller coasters. When technical problems occur, work lights turn on, as seen in this photo (taken from the PeopleMover). During a normal ride cycle, riders are immersed in almost complete darkness.

An indoor roller coaster or enclosed roller coaster is a roller coaster built inside a structure. The structure may be unrelated to the ride, or it may be intended solely or primarily for the ride. Many indoor coasters are custom made and placed in amusement parks or shopping malls. LaMarcus Adna Thompson, who pioneered the construction of the first simple roller coasters, initially built "scenic railway" rides including "indoor tableaux, panoramas, and biblical scenes illumined by car-tripped switches and flood lamps". The first known "completely enclosed roller coaster", called Twister, was built in 1926. Walt Disney World's Space Mountain was one of the first rides considered to be an indoor roller coaster, and was "the first indoor roller coaster where riders were in total darkness for the length of the ride so they couldn't tell where the drops or turns would occur".

== List of indoor roller coasters ==
=== Coasters in structures purpose-built for the rides ===
==== Asia ====
- Alien Taxi at Trans Studio Cibubur
- Comet Express at Lotte World
- Kereta Misteri at Dunia Fantasi
- Panic Coaster – Back Daaan at Tokyo Dome City Attractions
- Revenge of the Mummy at Universal Studios Singapore
- Star Wars: Hyperspace Mountain at Hong Kong Disneyland
- Tron Lightcycle Power Run at Shanghai Disneyland Park

==== Australia ====
- Scooby-Doo Spooky Coaster at Warner Bros. Movie World

==== Europe ====
- Astro Storm at Brean Leisure Park
- Black Hole at Alton Towers
- Crazy Bats at Phantasialand
- Crush's Coaster at Walt Disney Studios Park
- Eurosat - CanCan Coaster at Europa-Park
- Huracan at Bellewaerde
- Movie Park Studio Tour at Movie Park Germany
- Turbine at Walibi Belgium
- Revolution at Bobbejaanland
- Rock 'n' Roller Coaster Starring Aerosmith at Walt Disney Studios Park
- Star Wars: Hyperspace Mountain at Disneyland Park (Paris)
- The Walking Dead: The Ride at Thorpe Park
- Van Helsing's Factory at Movie Park Germany
- Vogel Rok at Efteling
- Winja's Fear & Force at Phantasialand

==== North America ====
- The Dark Knight Coaster at Six Flags México

===== United States =====
- Blazing Fury at Dollywood
- Black Diamond at Knoebels Amusement Resort
- Chicago Loop at Old Chicago (later relocated to an outdoor park)
- Disaster Transport at Cedar Point
- The Exterminator at Kennywood
- Fire in the Hole (1972) at Silver Dollar City
- Fire in the Hole (2024) at Silver Dollar City
- Flight of Fear at Kings Dominion
- Flight of Fear at Kings Island
- Guardians of the Galaxy: Cosmic Rewind at Epcot
- Harry Potter and the Escape from Gringotts at Universal Studios Florida
- Laff Trakk at Hersheypark
- Mystery Mine at Dollywood
- NightFlight Expedition at Dollywood
- Nightmare at Crack Axle Canyon at Six Flags Great Escape and Hurricane Harbor
- Revenge of the Mummy at Universal Studios Florida
- Revenge of the Mummy at Universal Studios Hollywood
- Rock 'n' Roller Coaster Starring The Muppets at Disney's Hollywood Studios
- Runaway Mountain at Six Flags Over Texas
- Skull Mountain at Six Flags Great Adventure
- Space Mountain at Disneyland
- Space Mountain at Magic Kingdom
- The Dark Knight Coaster at Six Flags Great Adventure
- The Dark Knight Coaster at Six Flags Great America
- Tron Lightcycle Power Run at Magic Kingdom
- Twister at Coney Island
- Underground at Adventureland

=== Coasters in structures unrelated to the rides ===
==== Asia ====
- Sky Train at Dragon Centre
- Supersonic Odyssey at Berjaya Times Square Theme Park
- An unknown coaster at Wonderful World of Whimsy in Cityplaza

==== Europe ====
- Toos-Express at Attractiepark Toverland
- Linnunrata at Linnanmäki
- Winja's Fear & Force at Phantasialand

==== North America ====
===== Canada =====
- Autosled at Galaxyland Powered by Hasbro
- Crystal Bullet at Bass Pro Complex
- Dragon Wagon at Galaxyland
- Galaxy Orbiter at Galaxyland
- Mindbender at Galaxyland

===== United States =====
- Avatar Airbender at Nickelodeon Universe (Mall of America)
- Back at the Barnyard Hayride at Nickelodeon Universe (Mall of America)
- Canyon Blaster at Adventuredome
- DarKoaster: Escape The Storm at Busch Gardens Williamsburg
- Fairly Odd Coaster at Nickelodeon Universe (Mall of America)
- Midnight Showdown at Kentucky Kingdom
- Nickelodeon Slime Streak at Nickelodeon Universe (American Dream)
- Pepsi Orange Streak at Nickelodeon Universe (Mall of America)
- SpongeBob SquarePants Rock Bottom Plunge at Nickelodeon Universe (Mall of America)
- The Shredder at Nickelodeon Universe (American Dream)
- TMNT Shellraiser at Nickelodeon Universe (American Dream)
