= Nickelodeon Universe =

Chain of indoor amusement parks

Nickelodeon Universe is the name of two indoor amusement parks located at Mall of America in Bloomington, Minnesota and American Dream in East Rutherford, New Jersey. Originally, a third location was under construction at the Mall of China in Chongqing, China, but it was later announced that it would not be branded as a Nickelodeon Universe. The parks consist of attractions and rides based on Nickelodeon’s popular franchises. The amusement parks are owned and operated by the Triple Five Group under license from Nickelodeon.

== Mall of America ==
Nickelodeon Universe Mall of America
- Previously known as Knott's Camp Snoopy (1992–2005); Camp Snoopy (2005–2006); The Park at MOA (2006–2008)

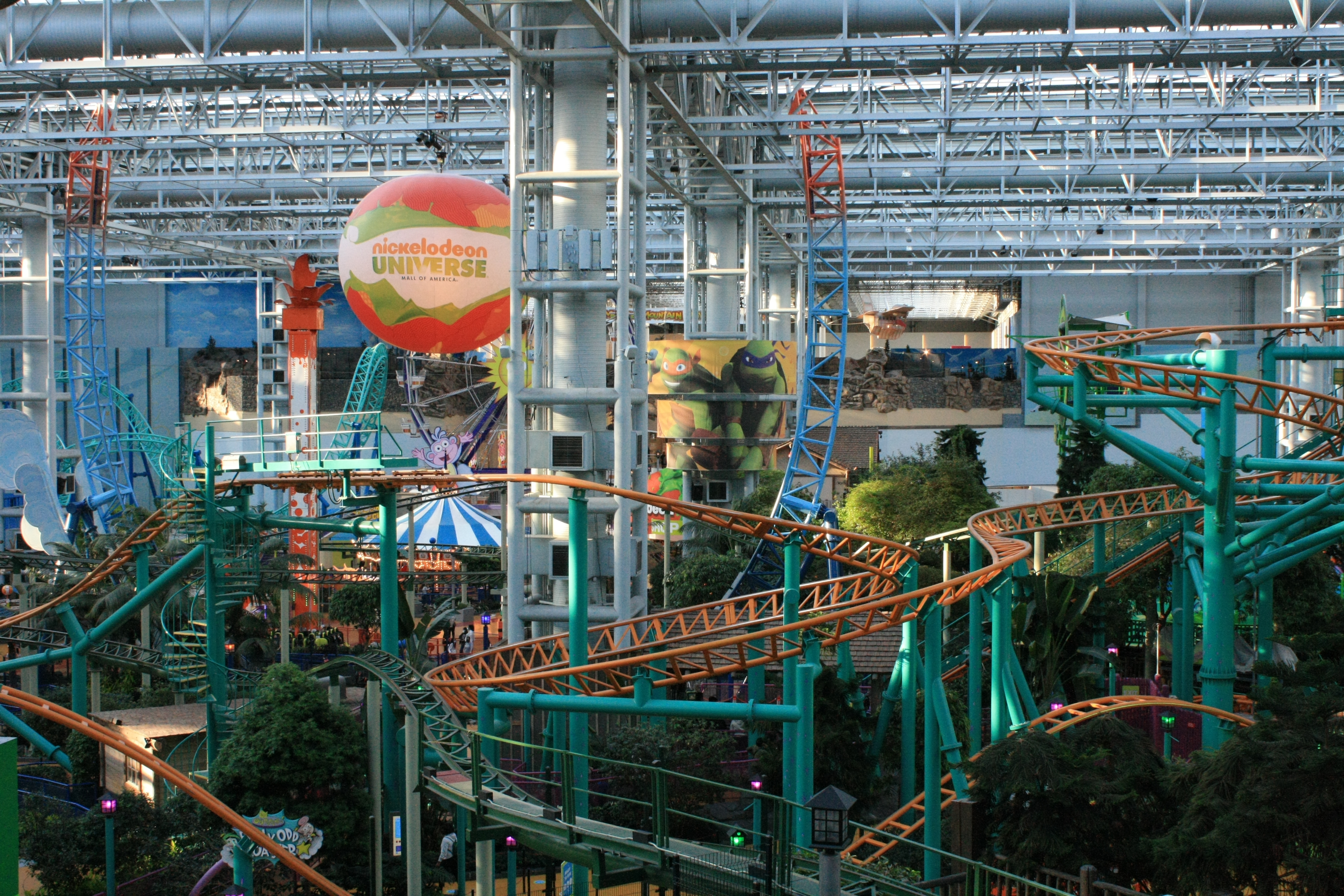
- Interactive map of Nickelodeon Universe Mall of America
- Location: Bloomington, Minnesota, U.S.
- Coordinates: 44°51′15″N 93°14′32″W
- Public transit: Blue Line Mall of America
- Opened: August 11, 1992 (as Knott's Camp Snoopy); March 15, 2008 (as Nickelodeon Universe)
- Owner: Triple Five Group
- Theme: Nickelodeon
- Operating season: Indoors, open all year
- Area: 7 acres (28,000 m^{2})

Attractions
- Total: 27+
- Roller coasters: 5
- Water rides: 1
- Website: www.nickelodeonuniverse.com/home/

=== History ===
==== Camp Snoopy ====
The park was originally known as Knott's Camp Snoopy, and later, simply Camp Snoopy, and was themed around the Charles M. Schulz Peanuts comic strip characters. Camp Snoopy themed areas are still located at Cedar Fair Amusement Company's parks. Camp Snoopy was never aggressively themed; the park had a very outdoors and woodsy feel with more subtle references to the Peanuts franchise. Much of the original theming in the Camp Snoopy fountain and all around the park was already toned down by the time the rights to the Peanuts characters were lost. Theming that was removed from the park prematurely and was never replaced includes various kites near the ceiling, Charlie Brown and Lucy playing baseball above the Sports Grill restaurant (although their baseball remained suspended in the air afterwards), theming in Snoopy fountain, the retheming of Snoopy Boutique, Snoopy Bouncer, the Snoopy Shop and much smaller theming. On April 7, 1998, New Horizon Kids Quest, Inc. opened a Kids Quest hourly child care facility in Knott's Camp Snoopy. It incorporated 17,385 square feet (1,615.1 m^{2}) and served children ages six weeks to twelve years until its removal in 2007. It was replaced by the "Dutchman’s Deck Adventure Course" ropes course, slides and zip line which was retooled into a playground in 2026.

In 2005, there were plans to revitalize the Camp Snoopy image and a new logo was introduced in October, called the "roller coaster logo" to replace the "canoe logo". However, this did not last long, as there were even bigger and unexpected changes coming within the next few months.

==== The Park at Mall of America ====
On January 9, 2006, Mall of America management announced that talks between MOA and Cedar Fair (which owns the national rights to amusement-park branding of the Peanuts license) had broken down, primarily over the mall's rights to effectively market its park within and outside the United States, and effective January 19, the park's Peanuts branding would end, the park being temporarily renamed The Park at MOA while new branding was being applied. All traces of the Peanuts branding was removed, some very sloppily, although the gift shops were allowed to continue selling Peanuts merchandise without the Camp Snoopy label. The inflatable Snoopy character was removed and it took several months before it was finally replaced by a generic tree house inflatable. The Funtastic World of Hanna-Barbera was the final film played in the Mystery Mine Ride, with the Mystery Mine Ride closing permanently in 2007. Many other landmarks in the park were either replaced by generic landmarks or not replaced at all.

==== Nickelodeon Universe ====
Original Nickelodeon Universe logo (2008–2010)

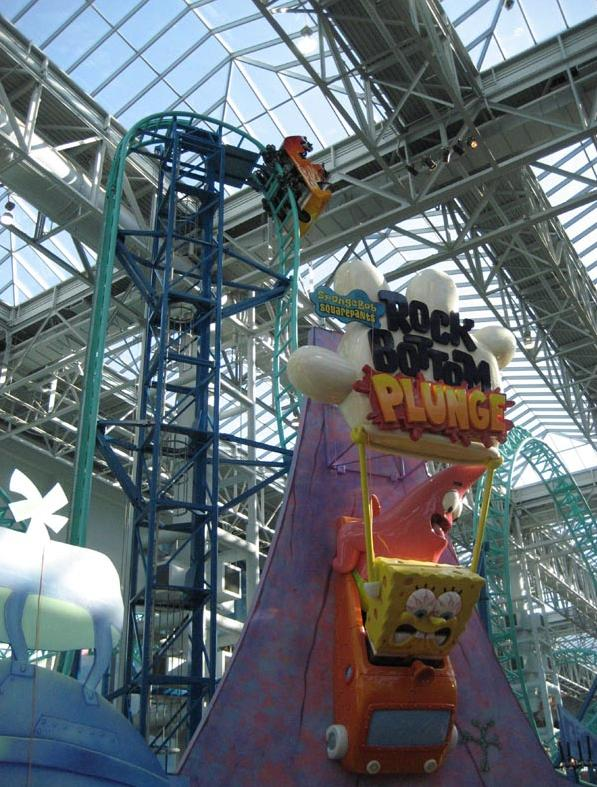
SpongeBob SquarePants Rock Bottom Plunge

On November 8, 2005, Viacom filed a trademark for Nickelodeon Universe. The park's new licensing deal and name, "Nickelodeon Universe", was announced on July 25, 2007. Construction began on August 27, 2007, work was completed in sections so 80 percent to 90 percent of the park remained accessible at all times. Nickelodeon Universe was completed on March 15, 2008. New rides include SpongeBob SquarePants Rock Bottom Plunge, a Gerstlauer Euro-Fighter 410 roller coaster themed after the Nickelodeon show SpongeBob SquarePants, the Splat-O-Sphere, a Moser's Rides drop tower in the center of the park, the Avatar Airbender, a surf-rider attraction located in the center of the park as well and BrainSurge which is on the side of the park. The shooting gallery beneath the Ripsaw and Pepsi Orange Streak roller coaster was gutted and was replaced by Rugrats Reptarmobiles. The Mystery Mine Ride was completely demolished to make way for SpongeBob SquarePants Rock Bottom Plunge. This site also included an Old Time Photography studio and restrooms. Old Time Photography relocated into the mall (but not within the park) and restrooms did not return in this section of the park. Levy Restaurants partnered with Nickelodeon Universe to include a themed restaurant at the park. The restaurant was called EATS and was located in the former Park at MOA food court. When the partnership ended, the EATS area closed and was replaced with a butterfly display. In 2014, a Hard Rock Cafe opened on the site where EATS once stood.

On March 12, 2008, the Star Tribune reported that the price of ride points, daily wristbands and, in particular, annual passes, would take a significant price hike once the park transitioned to Nickelodeon Universe. The price for an annual pass, which had remained $99 per year since the park opened in 1992, would increase to $250, and daily wristbands would be raised from $24.95 to $29.95. They eventually rose to $32.99 in 2014. In 2017, prices rose to where they currently stand, at $35.99 for a daily wristband. In April 2015, the price for the annual pass dropped to $139. In November 2021, Nickelodeon Universe announced the new annual pass program which has 3 different annual passes: Level 1 is Explorer which costs $175 but only valid on the weekdays, which is Monday through Thursday, Level 2 is Adventurer costs $250 but only works on any day of the week & Level 3 is Thrill Seeker costs $350 and it has all access all the time. Some denounced the price increases as being unjustifiably high when compared to other parks, such as local park Valleyfair at $79.95–$99.95. Others defended the pricing as necessary to accommodate the millions of dollars of investment needed to rebrand the park as Nickelodeon Universe.

On March 17, 2020, Nickelodeon Universe closed along with the rest of Mall of America in response to the COVID-19 pandemic. While the mall re-opened in June, Nickelodeon Universe didn't re-open until August. As a result of restrictions put in place by the Minnesota state government, Nickelodeon Universe was only permitted to re-open to a capacity of 250. Thus, the previous ticketing model—where entry to the park was free and patrons could either pay for rides individually, or unlimited–ride tickets that valid for the entire day—was temporarily suspended. Patrons then had only the option of a ticket that was valid for two hours from when it was first scanned at a ride; persons not riding were required to have a paid ticket to enter the park, albeit at a reduced cost. Capacity restrictions eventually loosened into the spring, resulting in the return of all-day unlimited-ride wristbands and point passes. The park reopened to full capacity on May 28, 2021.

=== Rides and attractions ===
==== Roller coasters ====
| Name | Opened | Manufacturer | Make/model | Notes |
|---|---|---|---|---|
| Pepsi Orange Streak | 1992 | Zierer | Tivoli - Custom | Formerly known as Pepsi Ripsaw (1992-2007) |
| Fairly Odd Coaster | 2004 | Gerstlauer | Spinning Coaster - 420/4 | Formerly known as Timberland Twister (2004–2007). The original layout used for the Pandemonium clones of the Six Flags parks. |
| SpongeBob SquarePants Rock Bottom Plunge | 2008 | Gerstlauer | Euro-Fighter - 410 | Located next to the former home plate for Metropolitan Stadium, which was previously located on the site of the Mall. Replaced Mystery Mine (1992-2007) and Yogi's Big Rescue (2006-2007) |
| Back at the Barnyard Hayride | 1995 | Zamperla | Mini Mine Powered Coaster | Replaced Huff and Puff. Formerly known as Li'l Shaver (1995-2007) |
| Avatar Airbender | 2008 | Intamin | Surfrider - 20 m | Replaced Camp Snoopy's Water Fountain (1992–2007) |

==== Thrill rides ====
| Name | Opened | Manufacturer | Make/model | Notes |
|---|---|---|---|---|
| BrainSurge | 2010 | Chance Rides | UniCoaster | Based on the game show of the same name |
| Shredder's Mutant Masher | 2015 | Chance Rides | Revolution 20 | Replaced Danny Phantom Ghost Zone |
| Splat-O-Sphere | 2008 | Moser's Rides | Drop Tower | Replaced the water fountain |
| Teenage Mutant Ninja Turtles Shell Shock | 2012 | Gerstlauer | Sky Flyer | Replaced Tak Attack |

==== Family rides ====
| Name | Opened | Manufacturer | Make/model | Notes |
|---|---|---|---|---|
| Paw Patrol: Adventure Bay | 2018 | | | Replaced Jimmy Neutron: Atomic Collider |
| Carousel | 1992 | Chance Rides | 36 Foot Carousel | Formerly known as Americana Carousel (1992-2007) and Nick-O-Round (2008). |
| Fly with Appa | 2024 | | | Replaced Bubble Guppies Guppy Bubbler’s former spot. |
| Log Chute | 1992 | Hopkins Rides | Flume | Formerly known as Paul Bunyan's Log Chute (1992-2007) |
| Ghost Blasters | 1999 | Sally Corporation | Interactive Dark Ride | |
| El Circulo Del Cielo | 1992 | Chance Rides | 63' Century Wheel | Formerly known as Skyscraper Ferris Wheel (1992-2007) |
| Crazy Cars | 1992 | Bertazzon | Bumper Cars | Formerly known as Bumpers (1992-2007) and Naked Brothers Crazy Cars (2008-2011) |

==== Kiddie attractions ====
| Name | Opened | Description |
|---|---|---|
| Backyardigans Swing-Along | 1992 | A Zierer Wave Swinger that was formerly known as Kite-Eating Tree from 1992-2006 and Tree Swing and 2006-2007 |
| Big Rigs | 1992 | Formerly known as Truckin' (1992-2007) |
| Blue's Skidoo | 2008 | A SBF Visa Group Junior Jets flat ride that replaced Red Baron |
| Boots' Banana Swing | 2024 | A clone of the installation in American Dream, a Happy Swing ride. |
| Bubble Guppies Guppy Bubbler | 2018 | A Zamperla Balloon Tower that replaced Balloon Race. Relocated in 2023 to make room for Fly With Appa. |
| Diego's Rescue Rider | 1998 | A Zamperla Junior Flying Carpet that was formerly known as Camp Bus from 1998-2007. |
| La Aventura de Azul | 1992 | Formerly known as Bloomington Express (1992-2007). Presumably a Zamperla Junior Railway flat ride. |
| Pineapple Poppers | 2008 | A bouncy castle that replaced Snoopy Bounce and Bounce |
| Rugrats Reptarmobiles | 2008 | A Bertazzon Junior Dodgems that replaced the shooting gallery. |
| Swiper's Sweeper | 1992 | Formerly known as Speedway (1992-2007). Presumably a Zamperla Junior Whip |
| Wonder Pets! Flyboat | 1999 | A Zamperla Junior Drop Tower that was formerly known as Frog Hopper from 1999-2007. |

==== Others ====
| Name | Opened | Description |
|---|---|---|
| Moose Mountain Adventure Golf | 1992 | |
| Xscape Entertainment Center | 1992 | Two locations; formerly Games! Powered by Namco |
| Flyover America | 2016 | |
| Rock of Ages Blacklight Mini Golf | 2017 | |
| 5D Extreme Attraction | 2018 | |

==== Former rides ====
| Name | Opened | Closed | Manufacturer | Type |
|---|---|---|---|---|
| SpongeBob SquarePants 4-D | 2003? | 2006 | SimEx-Iwerks | 4-D film |
| Huff and Puff | 1992 | 1995 | Bradley and Kaye | |
| Bounce | 1992 | 2007 | | |
| Red Baron | 1992 | 2007 | | |
| Mystery Mine Ride | 1992 | 2007 | SimEx-Iwerks | 4-D Theater |
| The Funtastic World of Hanna-Barbera/Yogi's Big Rescue | 2006 | 2007 | SimEx-Iwerks | 4-D film, this was the final film shown in the Mystery Mine Ride before its closure. |
| Tak Attack | 1998 | 2011 | Zamperla | Rotoshake |
| Balloon Race | 1992 | 2015 | | |
| Danny Phantom Ghost Zone | 1992 | 2015 | Chance Rides | Falling Star |
| Jimmy Neutron's Atomic Collider | 1992 | 2018 | Zierer | Hexentanz |
| Linus Loop | 1992 | 1998 | Zamperla | Mini Ferris Wheel |
| Beagle Ballroom | 1992 | 1999 | | |
| Dutchman's Deck Adventure Course | 2010 | 2026 | | Includes the Ghostly Gangplank ropes course, Anchor Drop slides and Barnacle Blast zip line. Retooled into a playground. |
| Barnacle Blast | 2014 | 2026 | | Zipline, part of Dutchman's Deck Adventure Course |

=== Dining ===
- Grub
- Sweet Treats
- Coaster Cafe
- Various carts featuring popcorn, mini donuts, cotton candy, Dippin Dots ice cream, Pepsi beverages and ICEE beverages

==== Former dining ====
- Hard Rock Cafe
- Caribou Coffee
- 1st Rnd
- Barbie Cafe
- Tall Timbers
- Stampede Steakhouse
- Mrs. Knott's Restaurant
- Mrs. Knott's Picnic Basket
- The Silver Stein-Festhaus
- Festhaus Buffet
- Hormel Cook Out
- McGarvey Camp Bakery
- EATS
- Cool Treats
- Schwan's Ice Cream Cafe (replaced by Sweet Treats)
- Slurp and Snack (replaced by Grub)

=== Retail ===
- Nickelodeon Shop
- Toys
- Gear
- LEGO Store
- M&M's World

==== Former retail ====
- 4U (Replaced by Peeps & Company, which eventually closed and became the mall's second IT'SUGAR location called "Candy Universe". This IT'SUGAR location is now closed.)
- NU Stuff (replaced by Gear)
- Candy Universe (operated by IT'SUGAR)
- American Girl Store (replaced by M&M's World)

=== Accidents ===
- On August 1, 1998, a 12-year-old boy, David Craig of Cable, Wisconsin, was killed after he fell off the Log Chute. When the boat neared the top of the chute, he began to panic and reached outside of the log to grab a railing. The ride stopped, but the log had already begun its descent down the major drop. Losing his grip, Craig fell off the chute, falling onto the landscaping rocks. He then died as a result of his injuries. Hopkins Rides, the manufacturer of the ride, inspected it and found it was in proper working order. It was Camp Snoopy's first fatal accident.
- On Saturday, August 15, 1998, an 8-year-old girl died of a heart attack after she rode the Screaming Yellow Eagle (later known as Danny Phantom Ghost Zone), a rotating platform ride from Chance Rides. Her parents said she died from a heart attack because she had a history of heart problems for five years before her death. The ride was operating properly.

== American Dream ==
Nickelodeon Universe American Dream
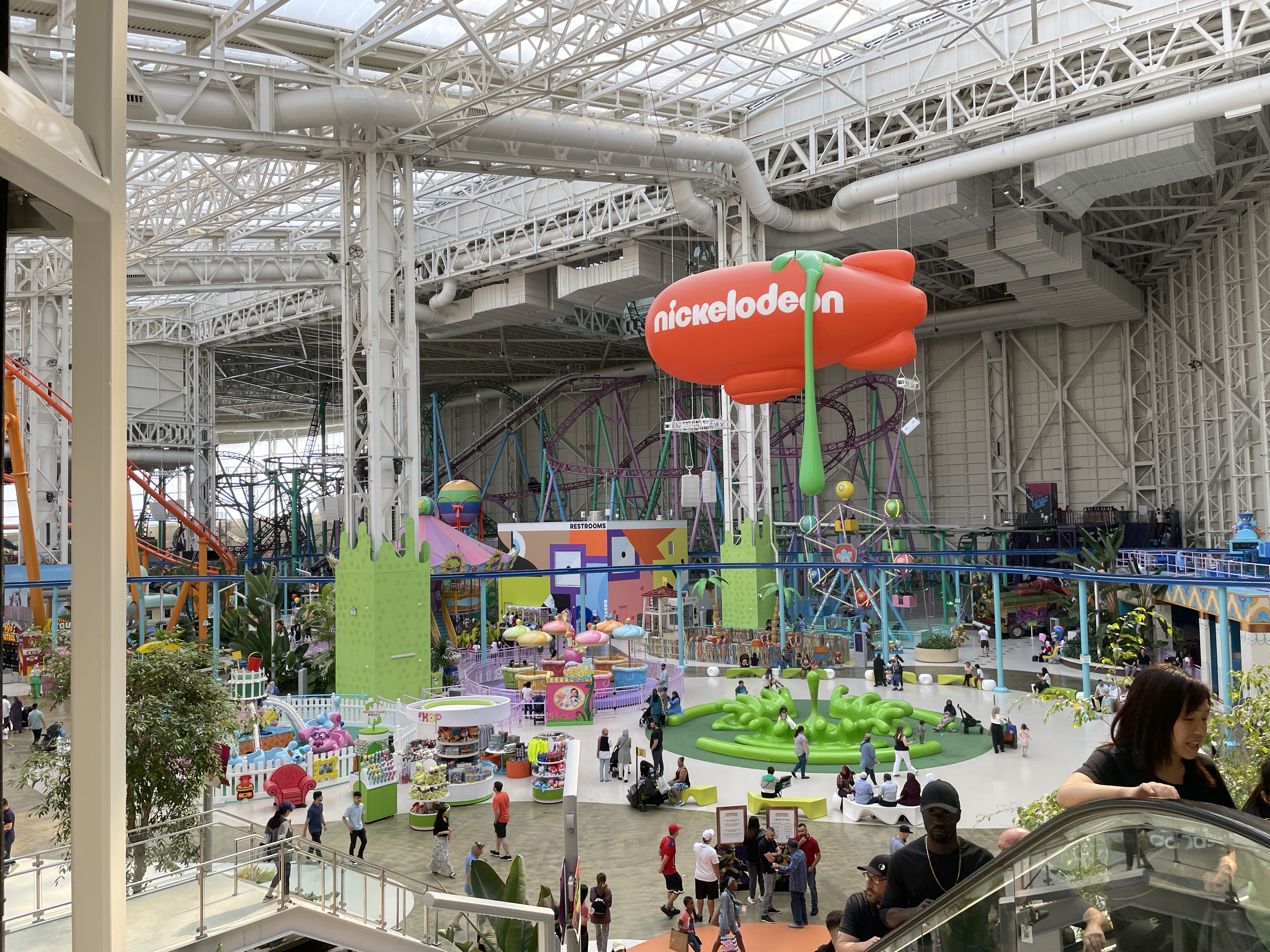
- Amusement park entrance (June 2023)
- Interactive map of Nickelodeon Universe American Dream
- Location: East Rutherford, New Jersey, U.S.
- Coordinates: 40.806591°N 74.071201°W
- Public transit: MDW Meadowlands
- Opened: October 25, 2019
- Owner: Triple Five Group
- Theme: Nickelodeon
- Slogan: Every Day is the Best Day Ever
- Operating season: Indoors, open all year
- Area: 8 acres (3.2 ha)

Attractions
- Roller coasters: 5
- Website: Official website

=== History ===
In September 2016, the Triple Five Group announced that a second Nickelodeon Universe amusement park would fill the 8 acres (3.2 ha) indoor amusement park space at American Dream, which would feature two world record-holding roller coasters. TMNT Shellraiser, a Gerstlauer Euro-Fighter, would hold the record for the steepest roller coaster drop at 121.5 degrees, and is based on a model seen in Japan. The second coaster, a spinning coaster called the Shredder, consists of four-passenger cars that spin on a vertical axis as it progresses down the coaster's track, and is the world's tallest and longest free spinning coaster, at 1,600 feet.

On March 13, 2020, Triple Five announced that the mall would be closed due to the COVID-19 pandemic, and the opening of retail shops and DreamWorks Water Park would be delayed.

On April 6, 2020, American Dream changed from a mix of 55% entertainment-related tenants and 45% retailers to roughly 70% entertainment and 30% retail. As of April 10, 2020, no retailers had backed out of American Dream. Triple Five said it will add eight more rides to the Nickelodeon Universe theme park, building on its early success.

On September 3, 2020, Triple Five announced that on October 1, American Dream would reopen its amusement park, water park, ice rink, and mini-golf arcade, each of which would limit patrons to 25% of capacity.

=== Rides and attractions ===
==== Roller coasters ====
| Name | Opened | Description |
|---|---|---|
| TMNT Shellraiser | October 25, 2019 | A Gerstlauer Euro-Fighter that is the world's steepest roller coaster at a 121.5 degree drop angle |
| The Shredder | November 2, 2019 | Gerstlauer spinning coaster |
| Nickelodeon Slime Streak | October 25, 2019 | Chance Rides family coaster |
| Sandy's Blasting Bronco | October 1, 2020 | Intamin Vertical LSM Coaster |
| Timmy's Half-Pipe Havoc | December 7, 2019 | Intamin Surf Rider roller coaster |

==== Other rides ====
| Name | Opened | Description |
|---|---|---|
| Aang's Air Gliders | 2019 | A Zamperla Air Race attraction that sends 24 riders into several inversions. The ride is themed to Avatar: The Last Airbender. |
| Bikini Bottom Crosstown Express | 2019 | A Zamperla Rocking Tug themed to a Bikini Bottom bus from the SpongeBob SquarePants franchise. Intended for families with young children. |
| Blaze's Monster Truck Rally | 2019 | A Zamperla Convoy where scaled-down monster trucks drive along an oval track encircling some mock stunt ramps. The ride is loosely themed to the Blaze and the Monster Machines franchise. |
| Blue's Skidoo | 2019 | A Zamperla Junior Jets flat ride where riders can board various vehicles themed to Blue and Magenta. Loosely themed to the Blue's Clues show. |
| Dora's Sky Railway | 2019 | A monorail-type ride that takes riders on a journey across the park. This attraction is loosely themed to the Dora the Explorer franchise and gives families an elevated view of the park. Presumably a Zamperla Junior Railway. |
| Fairly Odd Airways | 2019 | A Zamperla Flying Tigers ride taking younger riders for a flight in their own planes. Themed remotely to The Fairly OddParents. |
| Invader Zim's Flip & Spin... OF DOOM! | 2019 | A bumper car style attraction where riders can flip upon impact. Themed to Invader Zim. It had constant technical issues and downtime during the park's opening months, and was replaced by Bubble Guppies: Guppy Bubbler. The ride is currently in storage near Sandy's Blasting Bronco. It was an Amusement Products LLC Flip Zone. |
| Jimmy Neutron's Atom Smasher | 2019 | A Chance Rides Unicoaster 1.0 flat ride where riders spin along a track and can control the flipping motion of their vehicle. Themed to The Adventures of Jimmy Neutron, Boy Genius show, and only the third Unicoaster to be installed within North America. |
| Legends of the Hidden Temple Challenge | 2019 | A 10-story-tall interactive ropes course developed by Michigan-based RCI Adventure Products. Vaguely themed around the Legends of the Hidden Temple game show. |
| Nickelodeon Skyline Scream | 2019 | This is an S&S - Sansei Technologies spinning Rotating Tower drop tower, which is marketed as the tallest indoor drop tower in the world, taking the record from Galaxyland's Space Shot, which is 37 m tall (121 feet). Opened on November 7, 2019. |
| Paw Patrol Adventure Bay | 2019 | A large interactive play area with play structures, slides, that are and pits meant for younger children, and a replica of Adventure Bay themed around the Paw Patrol franchise. |
| Pup, Pup, and Away | 2019 | This is a Zamperla Junior Ferris Wheel that is loosely themed around Paw Patrol with balloon-themed cars. |
| Ren & Stimpy's Space Madness | 2019 | A 10-passenger Zierer family drop tower. This attraction can hold 10 riders and is themed to The Ren & Stimpy Show. |
| Rugrats Reptar Go-Round | 2019 | A Chance Rides double-decker carousel of the 36 foot variant. All of the vehicles are custom themed to the Rugrats franchise. Riders have the option of riding on Reptar's back or in a tea cup or other ride vehicle. |
| Shimmer & Shine Jumping Genies | 2019 | A Zamperla Jump Around where riders are speedily taken through a circle. Unlike many of the other attractions, this is located within an enclosed building within the park. Themed to the Shimmer & Shine show. |
| SpongeBob's Jellyfish Jam | 2019 | A Zamperla Wave Swinger themed to a horde of jellyfish in the SpongeBob SquarePants franchise. |
| Kraang Prime Pandemonium! | 2019 | This Zamperla pendulum ride takes riders in 360° loops going both directions. It is of the 16 seater Discovery Revolution make, and loosely themed around the Krang extraterrestrial villain in the Teenage Mutant Ninja Turtles franchise. |
| Bubble Guppies: Guppy Bubbler | 2021 | A children's Samba Tower ride themed to Bubble Guppies. |
| Zuma's Zoomers | 2021 | A boat Whip ride themed to Zuma from Paw Patrol. |
| Boots' Banana Swing | 2021 | A Happy Swing ride themed to Boots from Dora the Explorer. |
| Butterbean's Sweet Spin | 2021 | A Teacups cupcake ride themed to Butterbean's Cafe. |
| The Loud House Road Trip | 2021 | A Crazy Bus ride themed to The Loud House. |

==== Additional attractions ====
- In The Game arcade
- Double Dare Human Crane

== Never developed ==
=== Cancelled Chongqing, China location ===
On July 26, 2018, a Nickelodeon Universe theme park was announced for the Mall of China in Chongqing, China, accompanied by concept art featuring new attractions alongside rides similar to those at the American Dream location. Construction was briefly paused in March 2020 due to the COVID-19 pandemic, delaying the planned December 2020 opening. In 2025, it was revealed that the theme park will be named either "Hi Space" or "Moku Sphere," confirming the cancellation of its Nickelodeon Universe theming.

=== Cancelled New Orleans location ===
On August 18, 2009, Nickelodeon and Southern Star Amusement announced that a Nickelodeon Universe location would be built in New Orleans, Louisiana to replace the former Six Flags New Orleans that was destroyed by Hurricane Katrina in 2005 and would open by around the end of 2010. It was set to be the first outdoor Nickelodeon Universe theme park, but on November 9, 2009, Nickelodeon announced that it had ended the licensing agreement with Southern Star Amusements.

== COVID-19 pandemic ==
The two Nickelodeon Universe theme parks in Minnesota and New Jersey were temporarily closed in March 2020 due to the COVID-19 pandemic. Nickelodeon Universe reopened at Mall of America on August 10, 2020, while its park at American Dream reopened on October 1, 2020.

== See also ==
- Galaxyland at West Edmonton Mall
