= Ride Entertainment Group =

Amusement ride manufacturer

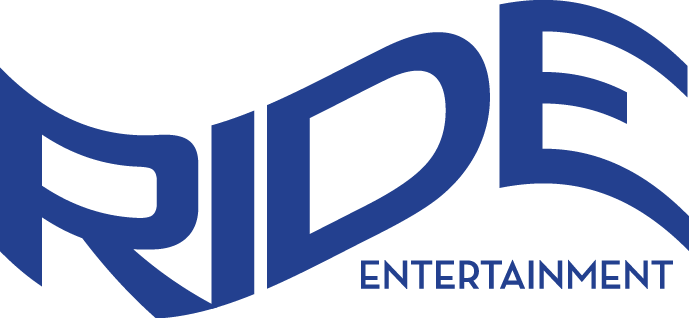
- Company logo
- Industry: Entertainment
- Area served: Worldwide
- Key people: Ed Hiller (CEO)
- Divisions: Sales; Operations; Financial Partnerships; Installations; SkyCoaster®.

Ride Entertainment is a firm based in the United States specializing in the construction, sales, service, and operation of amusement rides and attractions.

== Divisions ==
=== Sales ===
Responsible for the sale of amusement rides, attractions and related products. Companies represented or partnered with Ride Entertainment include:

- Gerstlauer – all of the company's North American sales are handled by Ride Entertainment. Attractions are manufactured in Munsterhausen, DE in the former factory of noted roller coaster engineer, Anton Schwarzkopf. Notable attractions include Dare Devil Dive, Untamed, FireChaser Express, and TMNT Shellraiser.

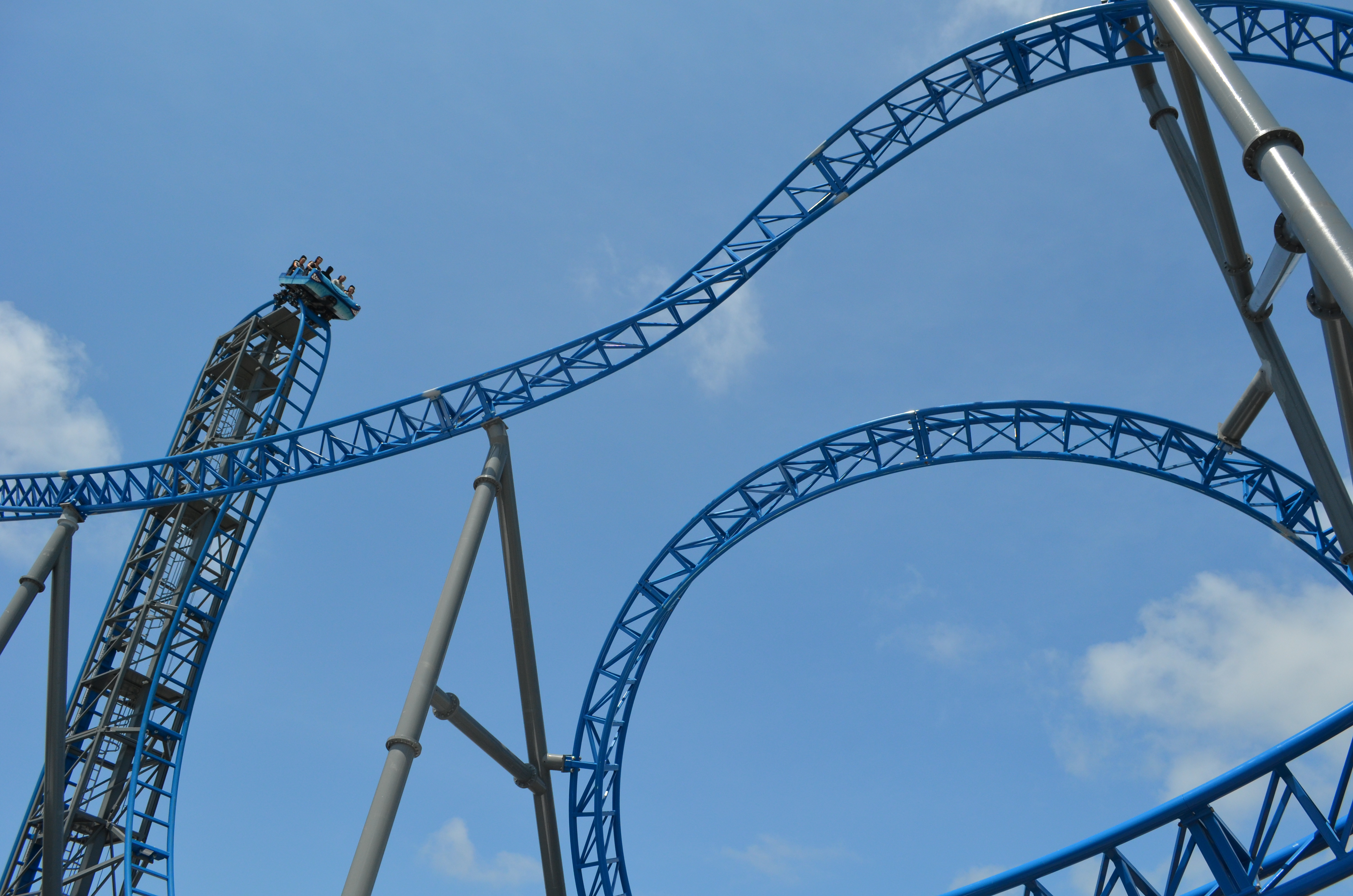
Iron Shark (Gerstlauer Euro-fighter model) at Galveston Island Historic Pleasure Pier in Galveston, Texas.

- Extreme Engineering – creators of the mobile rock climbing walls and auto-belay systems, the company created the Cloud Coaster, is known for ziplines, Extreme Air launchers and climbing walls.
- Funtime – all of the company's North American installations are handled by Ride Entertainment. The company's portfolio includes Star Flyers and Slingshots, most notably under the SkyScreamer name at Six Flags amusement parks.
- Lagotronics Projects – all of the company's North American sales are handled by Ride Entertainment. The company's portfolio includes indoor / outdoor, immersive “dark ride” experiences with proprietary, interactive game elements.
- Mettalbau Emmeln (MTB) - began with work on children's playgrounds in the late 1960s. Today, they specialize in custom-themed family attractions.

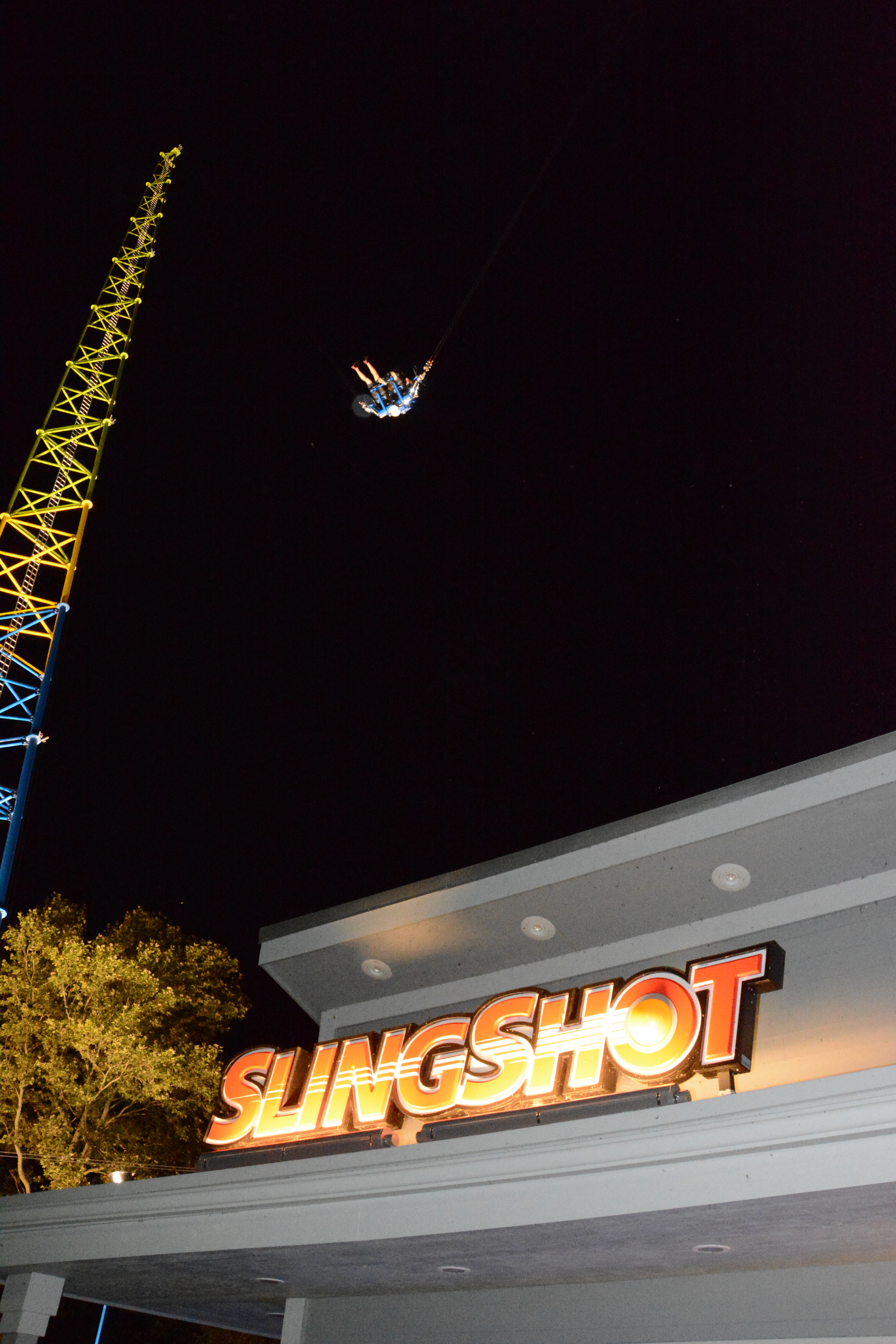
The Slingshot at Cedar Point in Sandusky, Ohio, is a 72-meter Slingshot from Funtime.

- RCI Adventure Products – Formerly Ropes Courses, Inc. Designers of the Sky Trail ropes course, which uses a small disc inside of a steel track. Ropes courses at Indiana Beach and West Edmonton Mall were sold and installed by Ride Entertainment Group.
- Skyline Attractions – based in Orlando, Skyline is best known for their “Strike-U-Up” ride-able games, as well as their Skywarp powered roller coaster models. The company also does significant work with queue line and attraction station design.
- V&P Rides - starting as an architecture firm, the company shifted to amusement attractions and specifically, flying theaters.
- KCL Engineering – the company created a proprietary LED lighting system suitable for mounting on roller coaster tracks and other attractions. Notable installations include: Hangtime at Knott's Berry Farm, the Orlando Star Flyer and Lotte World Tower.
- NewcoUSA - manufacturer of roller coaster and other attraction wheels, this partnership was announced in late 2020.

=== Operations ===
This division operates amusement parks and entertainment facilities at locations in North America, including such prominent locations as Forest Park and Fantasy Forest in New York, Rose Fitzgerald Kennedy Greenway in Boston, and the Seaglass Carousel in New York to name a few.

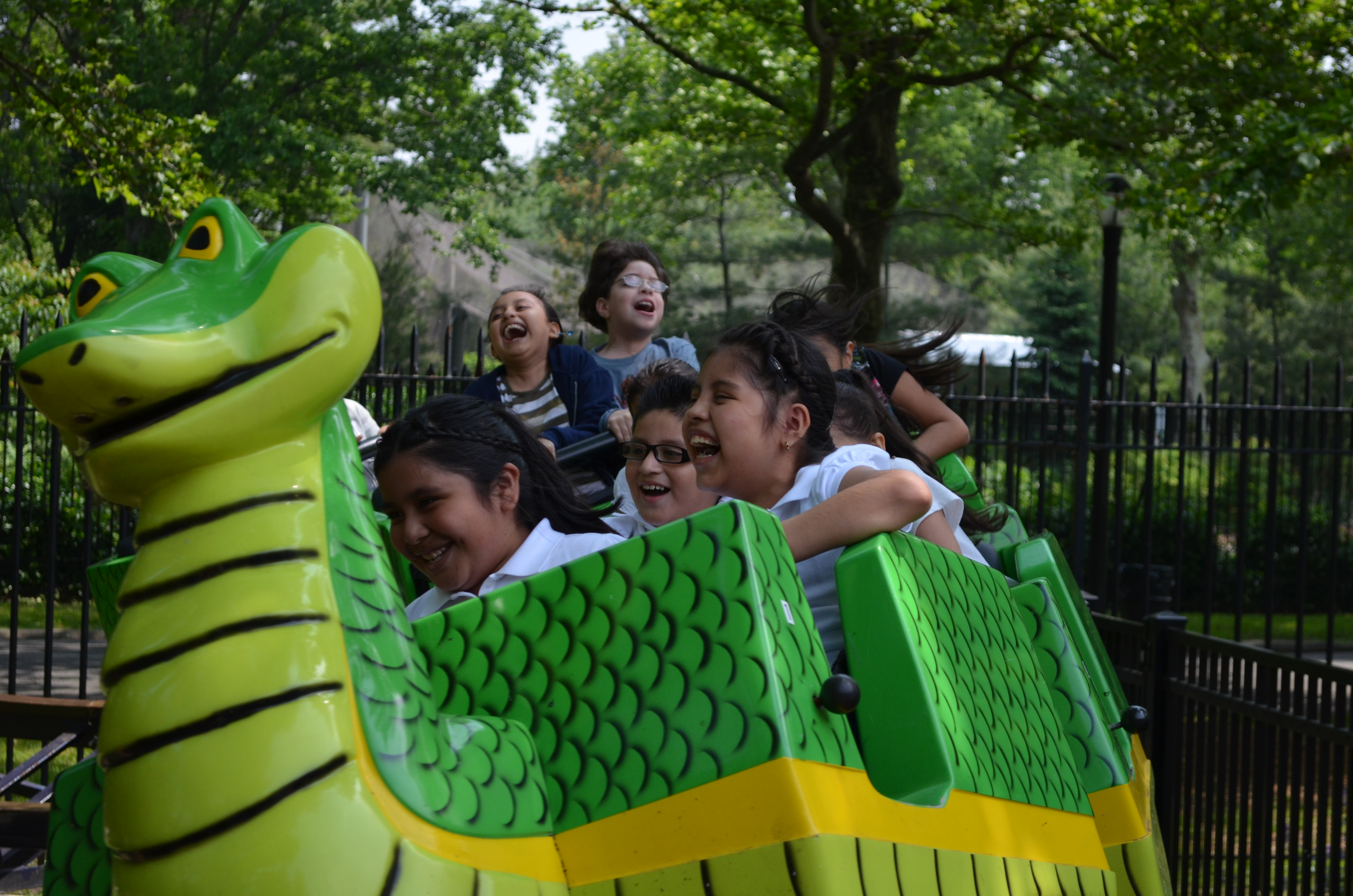
The Corona Cobra Roller Coaster at Fantasy Forest Amusement Park in Flushing, Queens, New York.

=== Financial Partnerships ===
Ride Entertainment is the attraction industry's largest provider of revenue share attractions, working with amusement parks, zoos, water parks and other facilities.

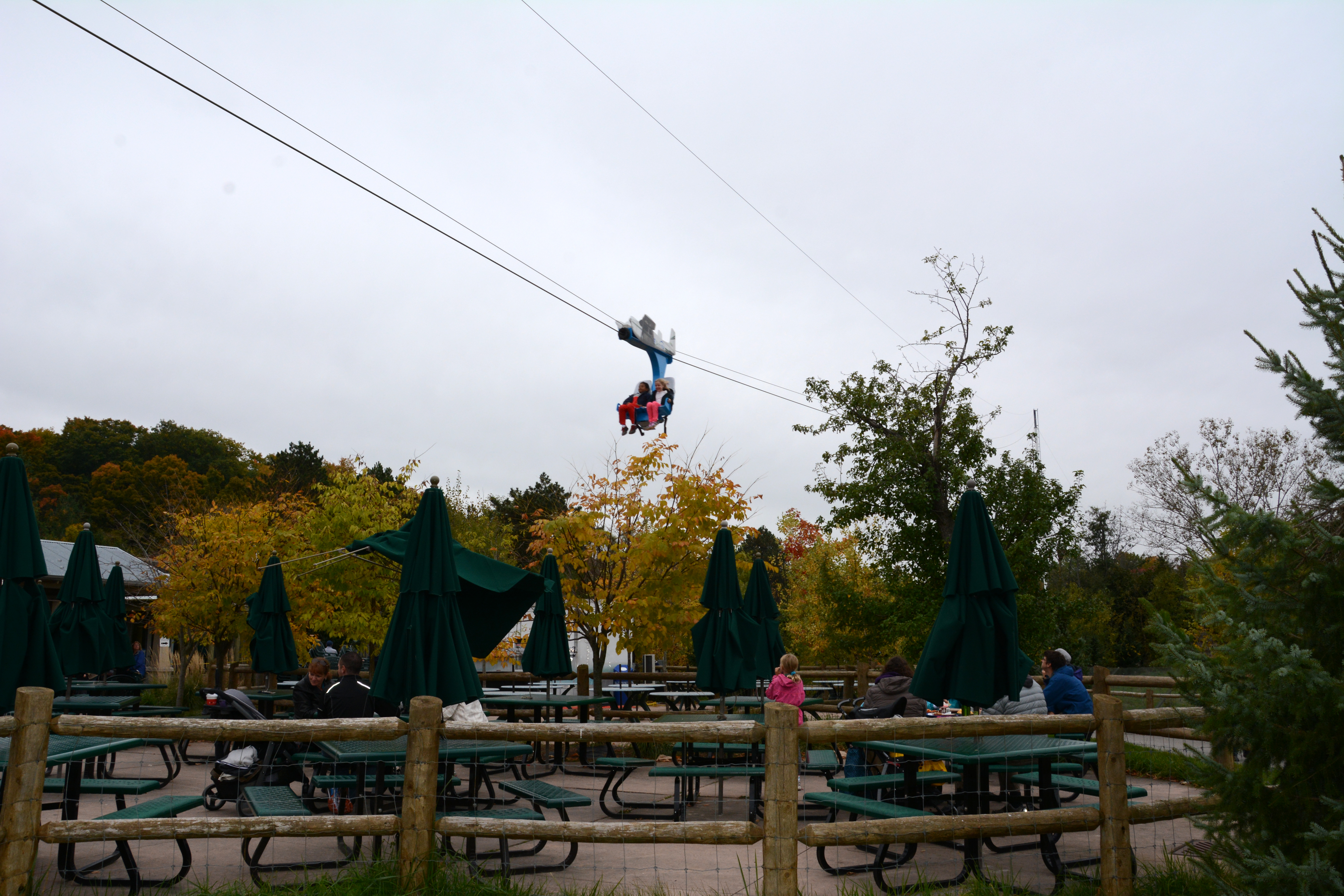
The Tundra Air Zipline at the Toronto Zoo in Toronto, Canada.

=== Installations ===
This division installs, maintains and rehabilitates amusement rides from manufacturers around the world. The company has worked with many different park groups, including Six Flags, Cedar Fair and OCT.

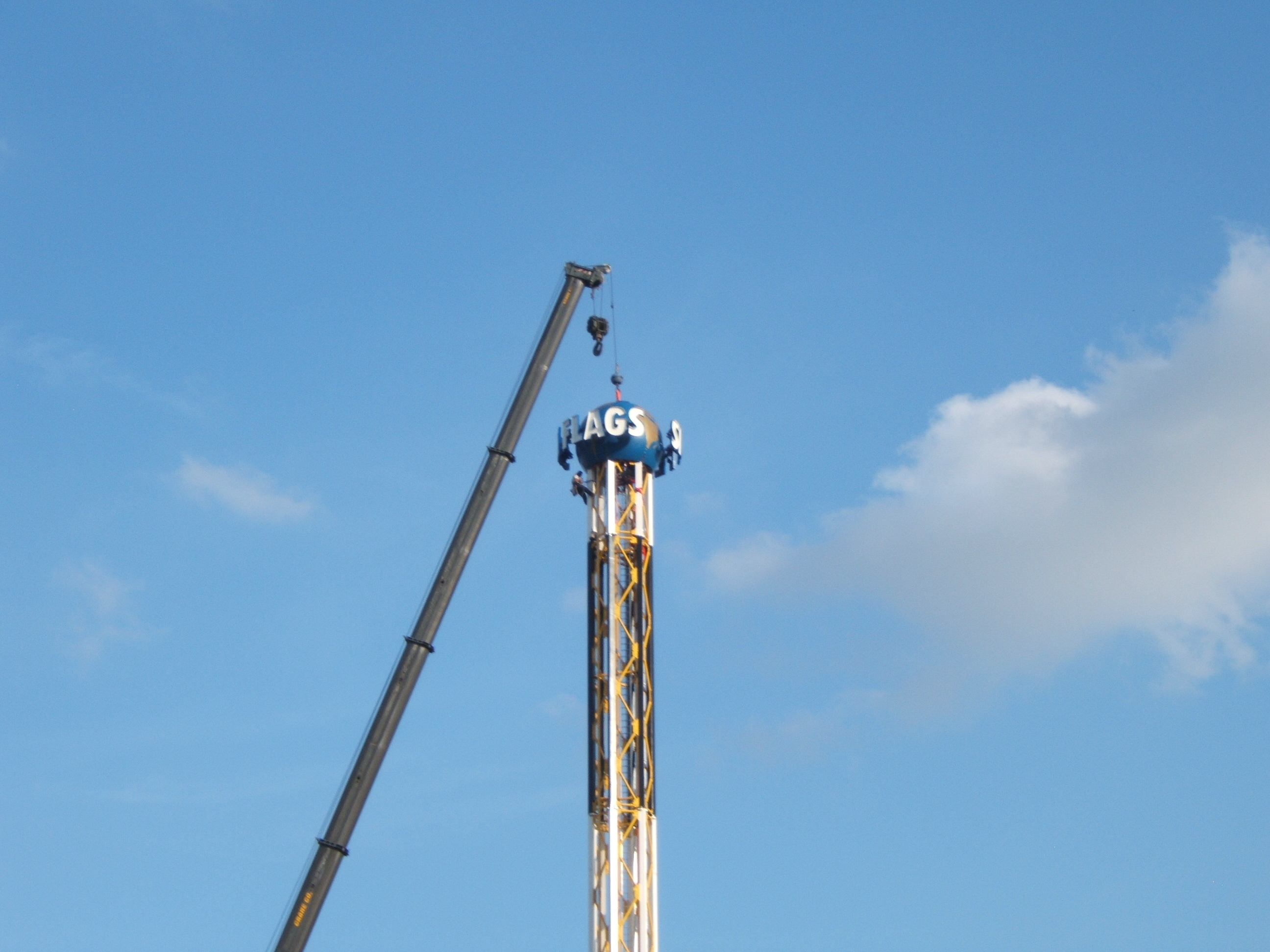
The SkyScreamer, a StarFlyer ride at Six Flags Fiesta Texas in San Antonio, Texas, being erected.

=== SkyCoaster ===
SkyCoaster has over 75 locations worldwide and was operated as a wholly owned division of ThrillTime Entertainment International. In 2005, SkyCoaster, Inc. as well as ThrillTime's other amusement ride, Top Eliminator, were sold to Ride Entertainment. This was followed in 2006 by a reverse merger transaction where ThrillTime was acquired by Advanced Proteome Therapeutics.

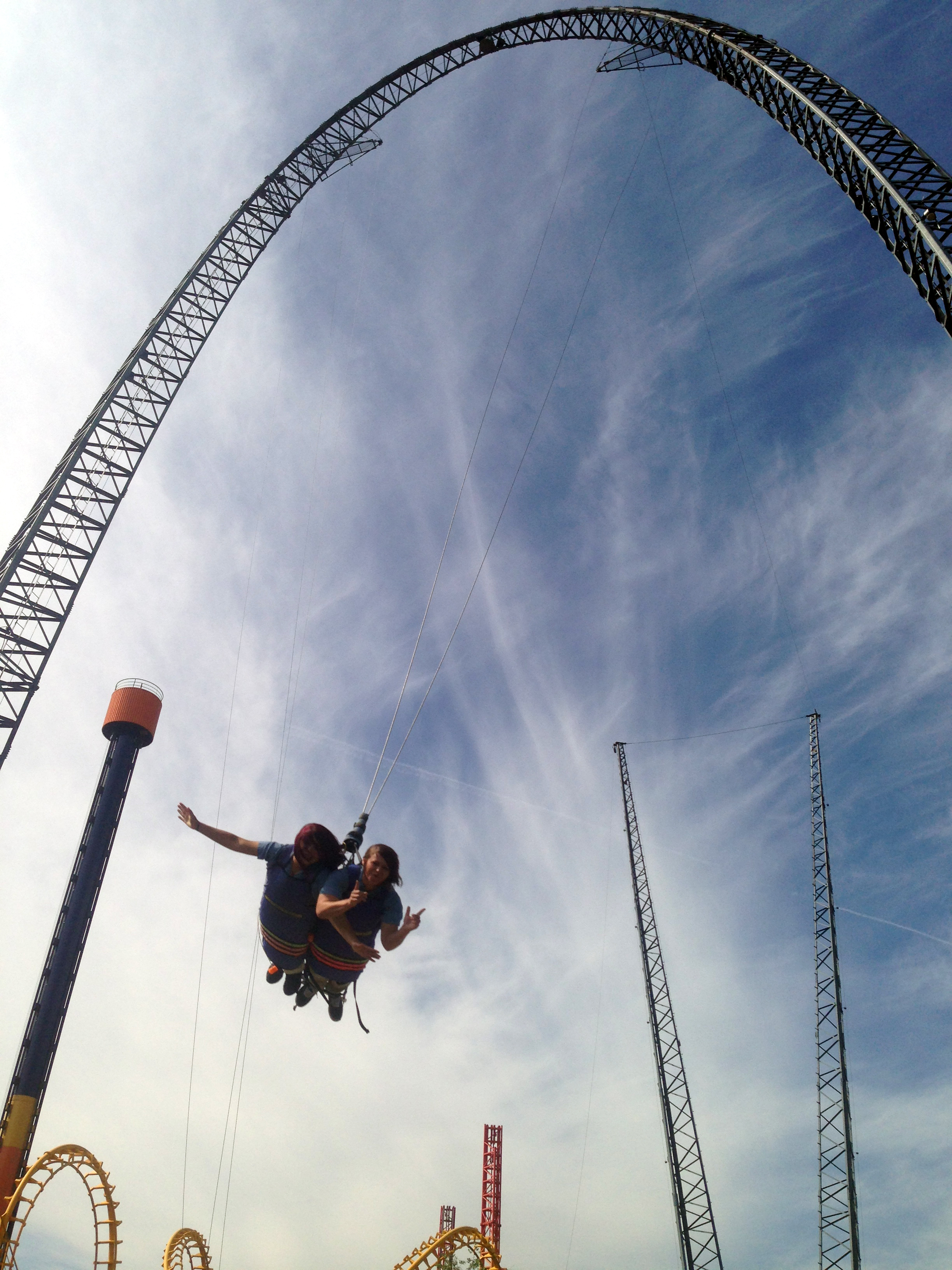
The Skycoaster® at Elitch Gardens in Denver, Colorado is a Dual Lattice 173-foot Skycoaster.
