= TMNT Shellraiser =

Steel roller coaster

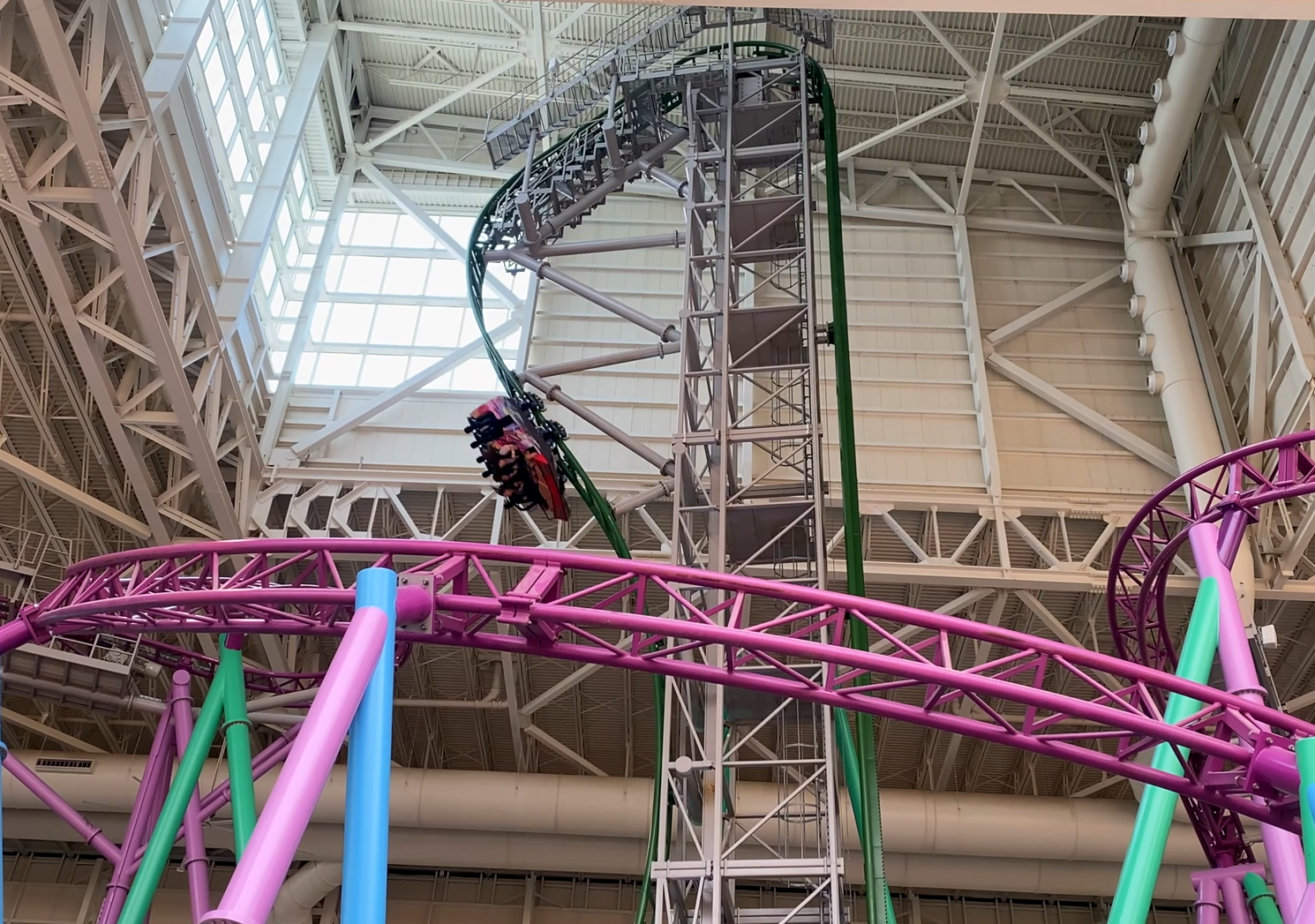
- A car descending the beyond-vertical drop on TMNT Shellraiser (green track)

Nickelodeon Universe
- Location: Nickelodeon Universe
- Coordinates: 40°48′24″N 74°04′16″W
- Status: Operating
- Opening date: October 25, 2019; 6 years ago

General statistics
- Type: Steel – Launched – Euro-Fighter
- Manufacturer: Gerstlauer
- Model: 1000
- Lift/launch system: LSM launch, chain lift hill
- Height: 141 ft (43 m)
- Drop: 138 ft (42 m)
- Length: 3,280.8 ft (1,000.0 m)
- Speed: 62.1 mph (99.9 km/h)
- Inversions: 7
- Duration: 1:52
- Max vertical angle: 121.5°
- Acceleration: 0 to 62.1 mph (0 to 100 km/h) in 2 seconds
- G-force: 5
- Height restriction: 48 in (122 cm)
- Trains: 6 trains with 2 cars; riders arranged 4 across in a single row for a total of 8 riders per train
- TMNT Shellraiser at RCDB

Video

TMNT Shellraiser is a steel indoor roller coaster at Nickelodeon Universe amusement park, within the American Dream mall, in East Rutherford, New Jersey, United States. The roller coaster is a Euro-Fighter model manufactured by Gerstlauer, and is themed to the 2012 Teenage Mutant Ninja Turtles series. It is the steepest roller coaster in the world, with a vertical drop of 121.5 degrees.

== History ==
In September 2016, officials at the long-delayed American Dream shopping mall announced that the Nickelodeon Universe theme park would be built inside the mall. Details about the park's coasters, including a Gerstlauer Euro-Fighter with the world's steepest drop, were revealed in December 2017. According to the mall's attractions director, Jeff Davis, the Euro-Fighter design was chosen because it would "break a world record [...] to claim the steepest coaster in the world", and that he "anticipate[d] up to 50 percent" of residents in the New York metropolitan area to ride the coaster. Vertical construction of the attraction officially began in early 2018. The names for the TMNT Shellraiser and three other coasters were first announced by Nickelodeon Universe representatives at American Coaster Enthusiasts' February 2019 "EastCoaster" summit. At that point, construction on the coaster was well underway. Ride testing began in April 2019.

TMNT Shellraiser soft-opened October 25, 2019, as part of the opening of the first attractions at Nickelodeon Universe in American Dream. The ride was temporarily closed after its soft opening because it did not have a permit to operate.

The ride was closed between January 9, 2024, and September 17, 2025.

== Ride experience ==
TMNT Shellraiser is located entirely inside the structure of American Dream. Upon leaving the station, the train immediately enters a slow heartline roll. It is then propelled by linear motors from a standstill to 62.1 miles per hour (99.9 km/h) in two seconds. The train ascends from the launched track section into a 125-foot (38 m) tall corkscrew. Immediately afterward, the coaster enters a banana roll inversion, a second corkscrew, and an airtime hill. The train ascends onto a set of block brakes, slowing the train down before it makes a U-turn to the right and ascends the 141-foot (43 m) vertical chain lift hill. Once at the top, the car is held by a brake before entering the 121.5°, 141-foot (43 m) beyond-vertical drop. Once the car is released from the top of the hill, it traverses a dive loop, an inline loop, and an Immelmann loop, before hitting the final brake run and returning to the station.

== Characteristics ==
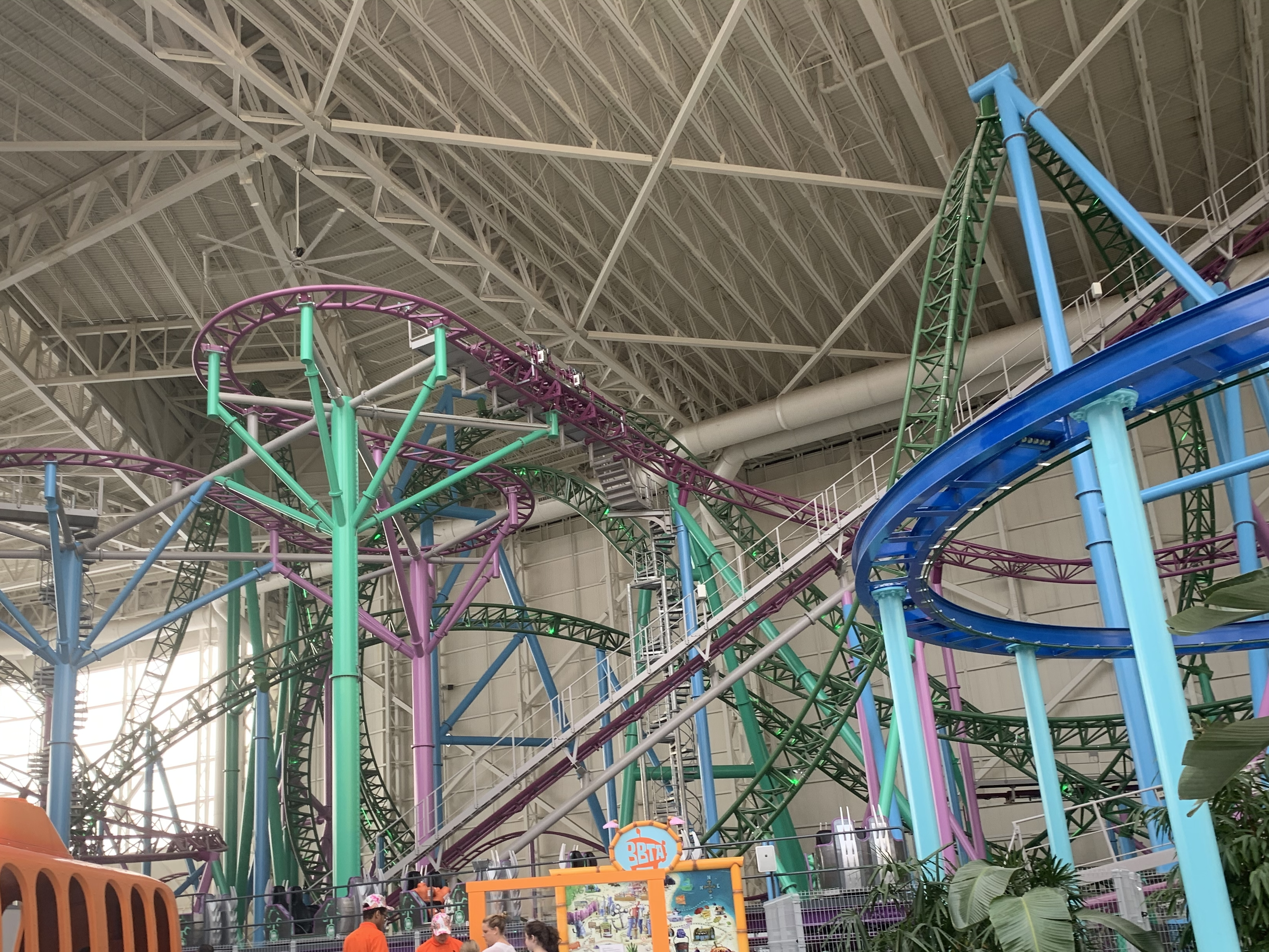
TMNT Shellraiser (green track) with other coasters, including The Shredder (purple track)

TMNT Shellraiser has green track with purple and light-blue supports, and has a total of seven inversions. (Note: The Roller Coaster DataBase counts the banana roll as a single inversion. Takabisha, which contains a similar layout to TMNT Shellraiser, is listed as having seven inversions, counting the banana roll once. Steel Curtain at Kennywood, another coaster with a banana roll element, counts the banana roll twice.) It ties with Medusa at Six Flags Great Adventure for having the highest number of inversions on any New Jersey roller coaster. At the top of the lift hill, the train is held by the brake for 14 seconds before being released into the drop. Riders are positioned so that they have a view of the New York City skyline in the distance. A section of the building's ceiling is raised slightly to accommodate the lift hill, as well as the windows facing New York City. The 141-foot (43 m) drop, at an angle of 121.5 degrees, is the steepest in the world, beating the previous record-holder Takabisha by half a degree. The ride also features the same layout as Takabisha, save for having a steeper drop.

There are six trains, each featuring a single car. Each car has two rows of seating, with four seats per row. The trains were given a custom paint design by a "local auto body artist".

The ride is themed to the concept of the Teenage Mutant Ninja Turtles fighting the supervillain Shredder in New York City's streets.

== Reception ==
A writer for USA Today said, "Shellraiser was a tad rough, but a load of fun." Travel + Leisure magazine said that "thrill seekers will love the scream-inducing Shellraiser".

== Notes ==
Preceded by Takabisha; 121°	World's steepest roller coaster October 25, 2019 – present 121.5°	Current holder
