= Vortex (roller coaster) =

Name shared by several roller coasters in North America

Vortex may refer to any of these roller coasters:

- Vortex (California's Great America), a stand-up roller coaster at California's Great America in Santa Clara, California, United States
- Vortex (Canada's Wonderland), a suspended roller coaster at Canada's Wonderland in Vaughan, Ontario, Canada
- Vortex (Carowinds), a stand-up roller coaster at Carowinds in Charlotte, North Carolina, United States
- Vortex (Kings Island), a steel roller coaster at Kings Island in Mason, Ohio, United States
- Vortex (Calaway Park), a corkscrew roller coaster at Calaway Park in Calgary, Alberta, Canada
