= Character Carousel =

Character Carousel is a classic carousel ride that is themed towards children.

Character Carousel may specifically refer to:

== Locations ==
- Character Carousel at Canada's Wonderland
- Character Carousel at Carowinds
- Character Carousel (Kings Island)
