= Fairly Odd Coaster (disambiguation) =

Fairly Odd Coaster is a roller coaster at Nickelodeon Universe in the Mall of America near Minneapolis, Minnesota.

Fairly Odd Coaster may also refer to:

- Fairly Odd Coaster (Carowinds), now the Woodstock Express at Carowinds in Charlotte, North Carolina
- Fairly Odd Coaster (Kings Island), now the Woodstock Express at Kings Island near Cincinnati, Ohio
