= Carolina Goldrusher =

Mine train roller coaster in North Carolina

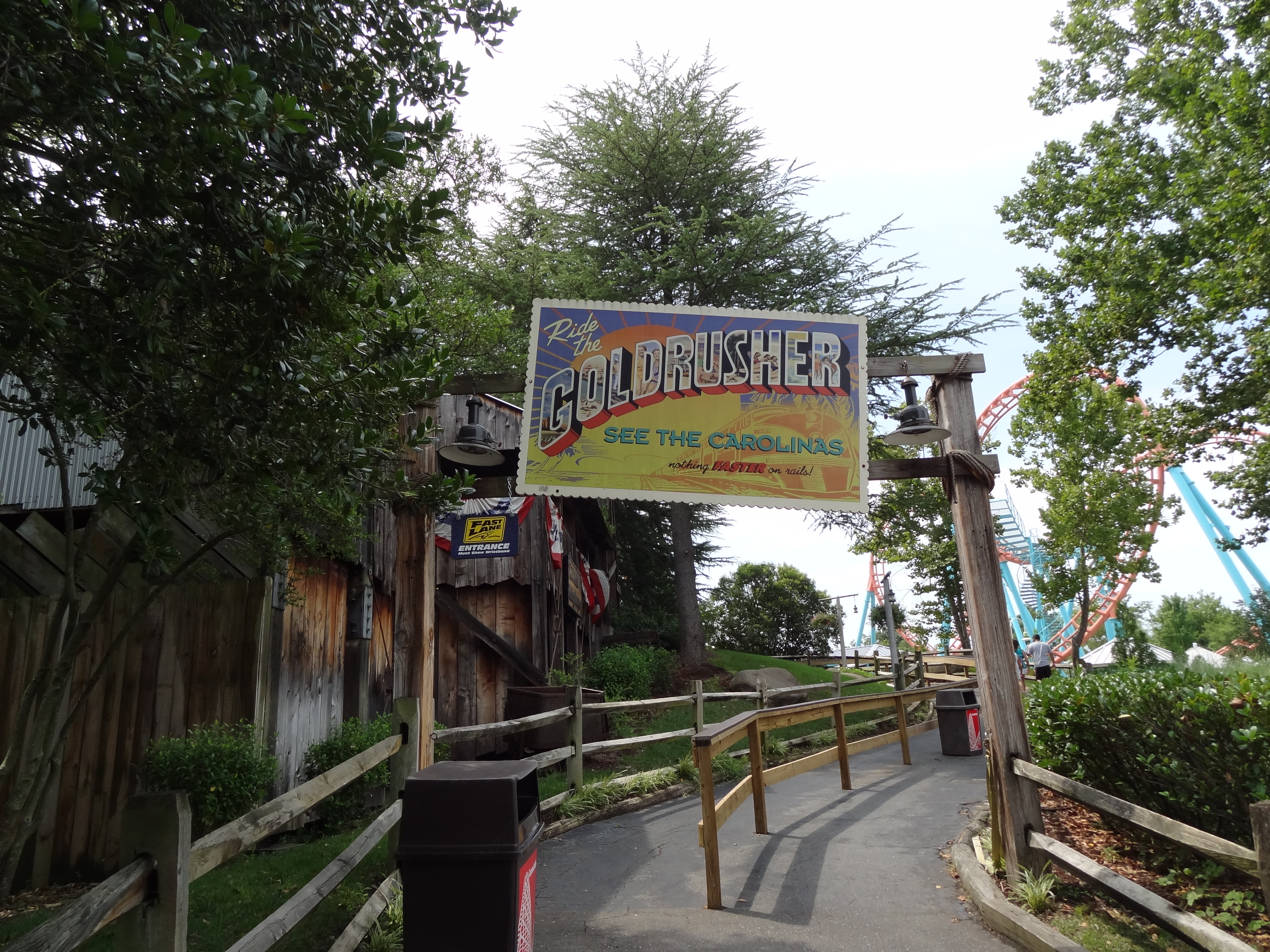
- Entrance sign

Carowinds
- Location: Carowinds
- Park section: Carolina Boardwalk
- Coordinates: 35.1025°N 80.9420°W
- Status: Operating
- Opening date: March 31, 1973

General statistics
- Type: Steel
- Manufacturer: Arrow Dynamics
- Designer: Ron Toomer
- Model: Mine Train
- Lift/launch system: Two chain lift hills
- Height: 43 ft (13 m)
- Drop: 34 ft (10 m)
- Length: 2,397 ft (731 m)
- Speed: 30 mph (48 km/h)
- Inversions: 0
- Duration: 2:17
- Capacity: 2,000 riders per hour
- G-force: 2.4
- Height restriction: 48 in (122 cm)
- Trains: Unknown number of trains with 5 cars; riders arranged 2 across in 3 rows with the exception of the first car which has 2 rows for a total of 28 riders per train
- Fast Lane available
- Carolina Goldrusher at RCDB

Carolina Goldrusher is a steel mine train roller coaster made by Arrow Dynamics of Mountain View, California. The coaster is located in the Carolina Boardwalk area of Carowinds in Charlotte, North Carolina. It was the park's first roller coaster, opening on March 31st, 1973, and is one of only four original rides that still operate in the park today.

The Goldrusher is themed after the titular Gold rush, seen in the wooden station containing era-appropriate American memorabilia, the steam train-themed roller coaster cars, the steam locomotive-style car positioned out front of the ride, and the Mineshaft themed tunnels the coaster goes through.

In 2023, a gold train debuted on the roller coaster to commemorate its 50th anniversary. Like other trains, it can fit six people per car in rows of two. Each train consists of 5 cars, allowing for a 30-person capacity per train.

The ride is well received with a 4.3 on Google. It has two drops. It is currently operational as of 2026.
