= Ricochet (Carowinds) =

Roller coaster in North Carolina, U.S.

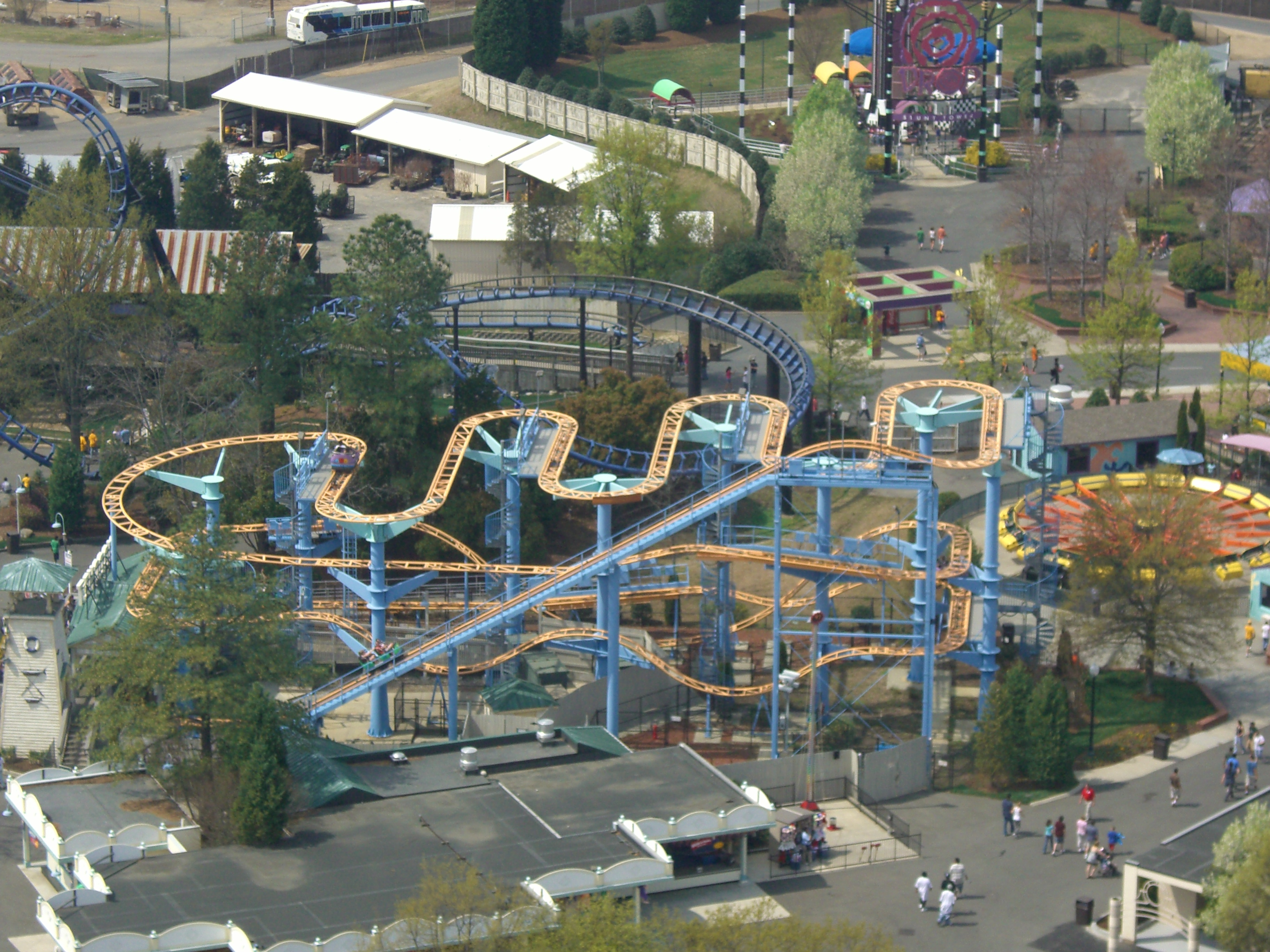
- Ricochet mouse trap at Carowinds

Carowinds
- Location: Carowinds
- Park section: Carolina Boardwalk
- Coordinates: 35.1042°N 80.9428°W
- Status: Operating
- Opening date: March 23, 2002

General statistics
- Type: Steel – Wild Mouse
- Manufacturer: Mack Rides
- Lift/launch system: Chain lift hill
- Height: 45.9 ft (14.0 m)
- Length: 1,214 ft (370 m)
- Speed: 28 mph (45 km/h)
- Inversions: 0
- Duration: 1:50
- Height restriction: 44 in (112 cm)
- Ricochet at RCDB

Ricochet is a wild mouse roller coaster located at Carowinds in Charlotte, North Carolina. It opened for the 2002 season. The roller coaster is located in the Carolina Boardwalk section of the park.

== History ==
On October 23, 2001, Carowinds announced that they would be adding Ricochet. It would be the park's 11th roller coaster. The new ride would also be part of a new Carolina Boardwalk section.

Ricochet officially opened on March 23, 2002.

== Facts ==
Ricochet at Carowinds is a Compact park model. It received a new paint job for the 2014 season, consisting of blue supports and green track.

- Height - 45.9 ft (14 m)
- Speed - 28 mph (45 km/h)
- Duration - 1:50
- Length - 1,214 ft (370 m)
- Capacity - 1120 riders per hour
- Cars - 8 cars. Riders are arranged 2 across in 2 rows for a total of 4 riders per car.

== Ride experience ==
Riders exit the station before taking a sharp turn and up a 45.9 ft (14.0 m) chain lift into multiple 180° hairpin turns. Then, riders go up a small hill, take a sharp turn, and go down the biggest drop on the ride. After that, riders go up a hill and turn into two bunny hills, the second of which features the coaster's on-ride photo. Riders then turn into one more dip that leads into the brakes.
