= Carowinds Monorail =

Former monorail at Carowinds amusement park

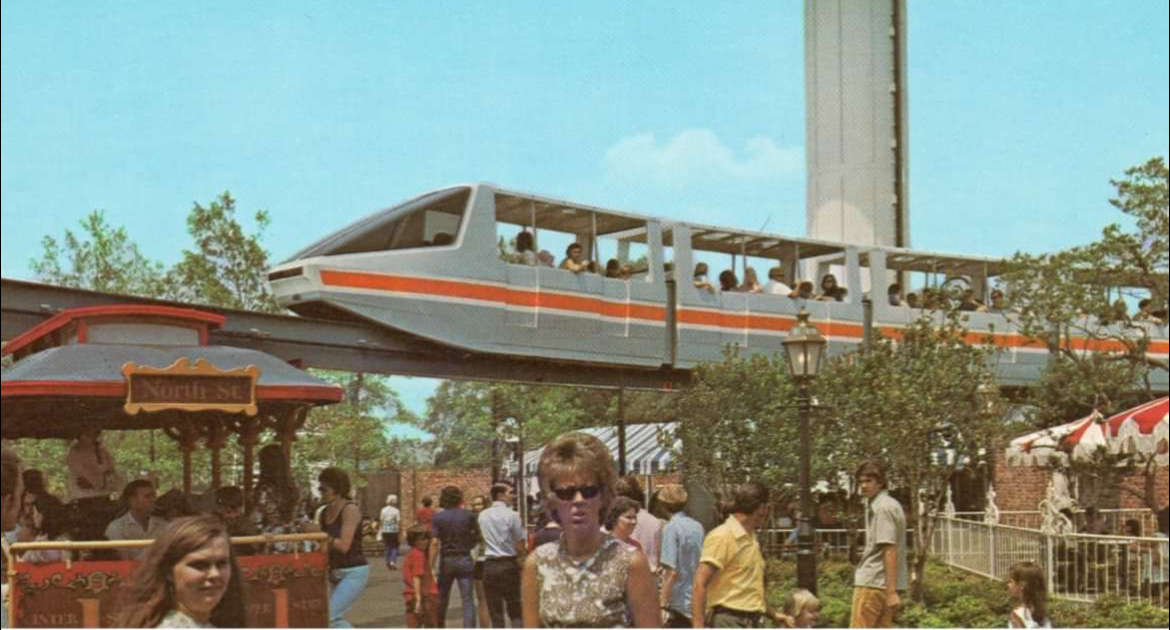

Overview
- Locale: Carowinds, Charlotte, North Carolina, United States
- Transit type: straddle-beam Monorail
- Number of lines: 1
- Daily ridership: 7,000

Operation
- Began operation: June 2, 1973
- Ended operation: August 1994

Technical
- System length: 2 mi (3.22 km)
- Average speed: 18 mph (29 km/h)

The Carowinds Monorail was a monorail at the Carowinds amusement park in Charlotte, North Carolina. Opening on June 2, 1973, it existed solely for entertainment, not transportation, as it had only one station. The ride was closed in August 1994, and relocated to the Vidafel Mayan Palace resort in Acapulco.

== History ==
The Carowinds Monorail was built by Universal Mobility Incorporated and opened on June 2, 1973, with both Governor of North Carolina James Holshouser and Governor of South Carolina John C. West present for the inaugural ride. The 2-mile (3.2 km) ride traveled at an average speed of 18 miles per hour (29 km/h) and took 10 minutes and 14 seconds to complete. Originally, the monorail was to have connected the park with a hotel that was never built. The attraction would reach a peak of 500,000 riders in 1982, only to fall in subsequent years resulting in its closure in August 1994. At the time of its closure, the monorail had a daily ridership of 7,000. Its deconstruction would commence in November 1994 and be complete by December. The deconstructed monorail was then shipped to Acapulco, Mexico, by way of barge and reassembled in 1995 at the Vidafel Mayan Palace resort.
