= Carowinds =

Amusement park in Charlotte, North Carolina

Carowinds & Carolina Harbor
- Previously known as Paramount's Carowinds (1993–2006)
- Joint logo with Carolina Harbor used since 2026

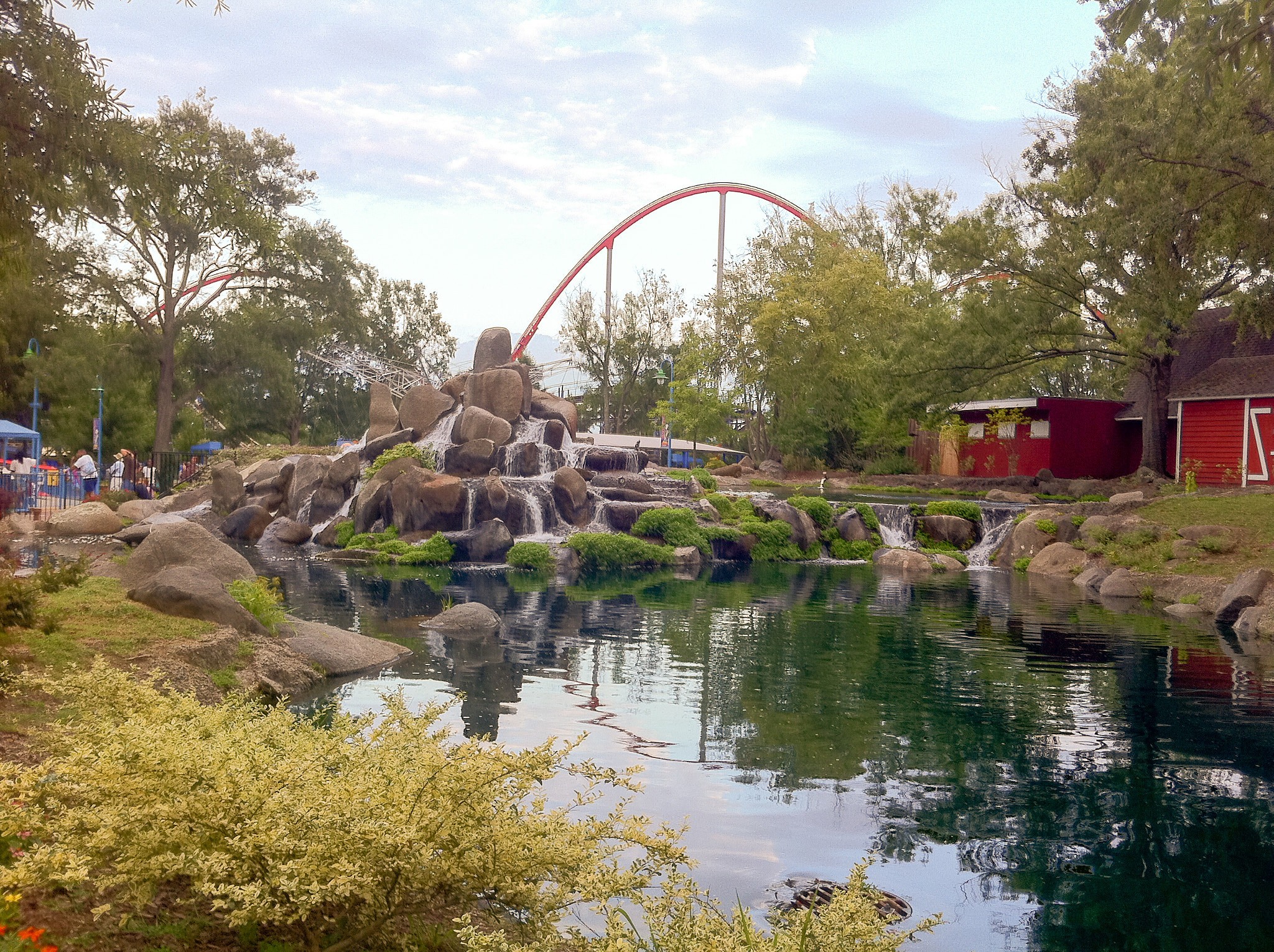
- A view of Thunder Striker from the Camp Snoopy area.
- Interactive map of Carowinds & Carolina Harbor
- Location: Charlotte, North Carolina & York County, South Carolina, United States
- Coordinates: 35°06′10″N 80°56′30″W
- Status: Operating
- Opened: March 31, 1973; 53 years ago
- Owner: Six Flags
- Park president: Bridgette Bywater
- Slogan: "Where The Carolinas Come Together"
- Operating season: March through January
- Attendance: 2.3 million
- Area: 407 acres (1.65 km^{2})

Attractions
- Total: 42
- Roller coasters: 14 (as of 2026)
- Website: sixflags.com/carowinds

Carowinds (also known as Carowinds & Carolina Harbor) is a 407-acre (165 ha) amusement park primarily located in Charlotte, North Carolina. The park is owned and operated by Six Flags. Carowinds straddles the state line between North and South Carolina, adjacent to Interstate 77, with a portion of the park located in York County, South Carolina. The state line is painted and runs through the main entrance area of the park.

The park was constructed at a cost of $70 million following a four-year planning period led by Charlotte businessman Earl Patterson Hall. Carowinds first opened to the public on March 31, 1973. The park features Carolina Harbor, a 27-acre (11 ha) water park that is included with park admission. Annual events include the Halloween-themed SCarowinds and the Christmas-themed WinterFest.

== History ==
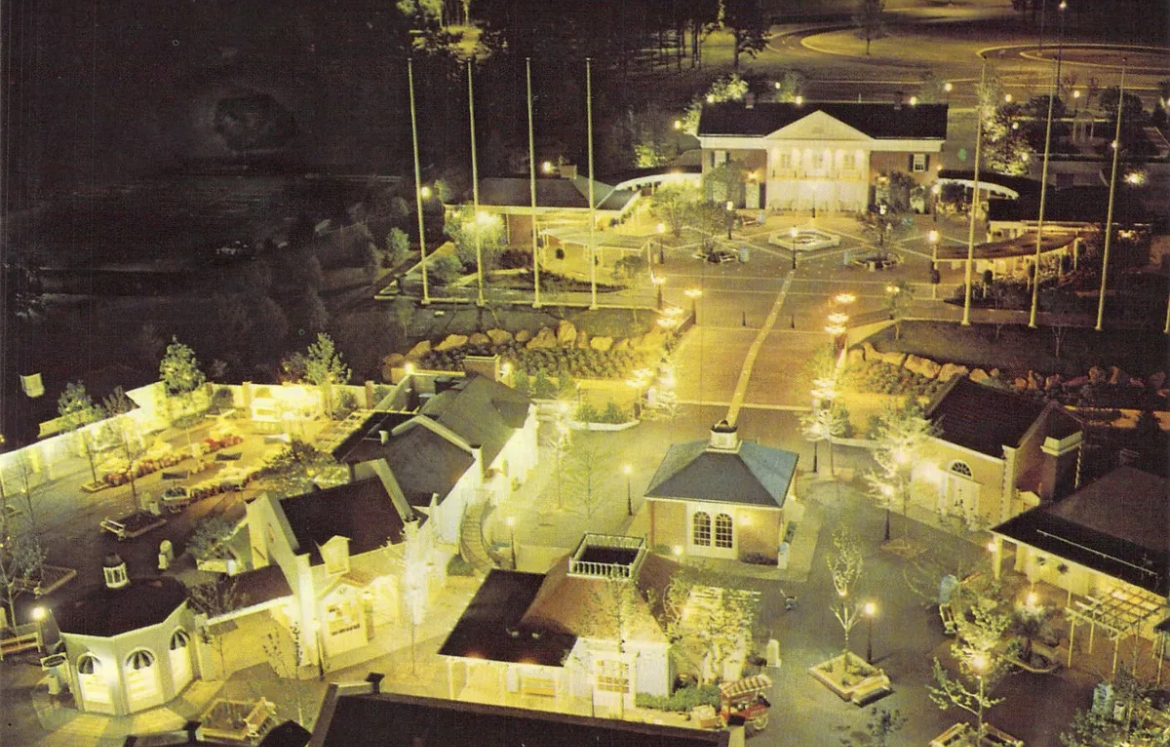
Carowinds 'Plantation Square' area as it appeared in 1973

=== Early history, Carowinds Corporation (1969–1974) ===
Carowinds was announced on October 10, 1969, and originally planned on being a large resort which would include a theme park, hotels, a shopping center, a golf course, and an NFL stadium. The name Carowinds was conceived from the park's original theme of the history and culture of the Carolinas, and is a portmanteau of Carolina and winds, in reference to the winds that blow across the two states. Ground was broken on May 1, 1970, with a planned opening date in April 1972. After numerous construction delays due to weather, the park eventually opened on March 31, 1973, under the ownership of the Carowinds Corporation, a consortium of local investors headed by Hall. The first season brought in over 1.2 million visitors, but attendance at Carowinds was curtailed by the 1973 oil crisis, and plans for the proposed resort were put on hold. Sagging attendance and mounting debt forced Carowinds Corporation to merge with Taft Broadcasting in early 1975.

=== Taft Broadcasting and KECO (1975–1992) ===
==== 1970s ====
Taft originally ran the park through Family Leisure Centers, a joint venture between Taft and Top Value Enterprises (owned by the Kroger supermarket chain). It was later transferred to a wholly owned Taft subsidiary, Kings Entertainment Company. Taft Broadcasting brought new life to the park with its Hanna-Barbera characters and several rides aimed to appeal to younger guests. Carowinds added its second roller coaster, and first wooden coaster, with the addition of Scooby-Doo in 1975. The Wagon Wheel and The Waltzer flat rides were also added to the park. A small carousel was added to the Carolina Crossroads area. In 1976, Carowinds opened Thunder Road, a Philadelphia Toboggan Coasters racing wooden coaster designed by Curtis D. Summers. It was the largest and most expensive ride built in Carowinds' short three years of existence, at a cost of $1.6 million. The trains were relocated from the defunct Jetstream roller coaster at Chicago's Riverview Park. White Lightnin', a Schwarzkopf launched shuttle roller coaster, opened in 1977. The Witchdoctor was relocated to Pirate Island and renamed Black Widow. The Waltzer was removed after a year of operation and replaced by Wagon Wheel. Trams are added to the parking lot. In 1979, a $3 million expansion adds the County Fair area, which contains four new rides. Additionally, a 1923 antique carousel built by the Philadelphia Toboggan Company was added to The Land of Hanna-Barbera.

==== 1980s ====
The Carolina Cyclone was added in 1980 as the first roller coaster in the world to feature four inversions. Thunder Road received new Philadelphia Toboggan Coasters trains. The original themed trains were destroyed after causing damage to the tracks. Rip Roarin' Rapids, a water rapids ride, opens in 1982. In 1982, Ocean Island opens as a separately ticketed attraction between Thunder Road and the White Lightnin' roller coasters. The water park was not owned by Carowinds, and included a 700,000-gallon, 25,500 square foot wave pool that featured waves reaching heights of five feet. The complex also featured other standard water park amenities including picnic and sunbathing areas, shower and changing facilities, a snack bar, game room, raft rentals and a gift shop. Oaken Bucket was removed. The Heritage Theater was converted into an arcade. In 1984, Smurf Island opens on a 1.3 acre island surrounded by the Carolina Sternwheeler river boat. The Flying Dutchman was removed, and the Paladium was expanded. Blackbeard's Revenge, an Arrow-Huss haunted swing ride, was added in 1985.

In 1986, County Fair was renovated and Frenzoid, a 360-degree looping Viking ship, was added to the area. In 1987, Carowinds purchases Ocean Island. Vintage Jalopies is removed and the Panorama Vision theater is converted to an arcade. The following year, White Lightnin' is removed due to continuous maintenance downtime. The Balloon Race flat ride and WhiteWater Falls, a 45 foot tall water attraction is added. In 1989, Ocean Island is renamed to RipTide Reef and expanded to over 6 acres on the land previously occupied by White Lightnin'. Black Widow is removed the same year.

==== Early 1990s ====
In 1990, Gauntlet, a prototype thrill ride, was added to the park. The following year, the Paladium becomes a stand-alone concert facility- separate from the theme park with an expanded seating capacity of 13,000 after a $4 million renovation. In 1992, Kings Entertainment Company was acquired by Paramount Communications and Paramount Parks was formed, with the corporate headquarters a few miles away from the park in Charlotte. The same year, Carowinds introduces the Vortex stand-up roller coaster.

=== Paramount era (1993–2006) ===
==== 1990s ====
Carowinds logo used during its Paramount ownership

The park's name was changed to Paramount's Carowinds in 1993. Movies and television shows from various Paramount Pictures were introduced into the park, including Days of Thunder. The Paramount Walk of Fame was constructed on the path from the park's main entrance to the park's central hub. In 1994, Wayne's World, a new three acre themed area that re-creates the Hollywood set popularized in the Paramount motion picture of the same name, is added to the northwestern corner of the park with the Hurler roller coaster as its centerpiece.

In 1995, Animation Station introduces an interactive experience for kids featuring The Power Station, a three-story climbing structure, and Kids' Studio, an outdoor amphitheater for children's shows. On June 30 of the same year, a skycoaster ride called Skycoaster opened in the Wayne's World section. Drop Zone: Stunt Tower was also added in 1996 in the same area. The park hosted 1.8 million visitors, making it one of the largest tourist attractions in the Carolinas. In 1997, to celebrate the park's 25th anniversary, RipTide Reef is expanded into WaterWorks, doubling its size to include 12 acres at a cost of $7.5 million. In 1998, ZOOM ZONE opens in Animation Station. The expansion adds three new attractions: Taxi Jam, Chopper Chase and Road Rally and increases the size of the area by 3.5 acres. The addition of Top Gun: The Jet Coaster in 1999 became the single-largest investment in the park's history at a cost of $10.5 million.

==== 2000s ====
In 2000, The Nickelodeon Flying Super Saturator takes riders along a 1,087-foot suspended track while dodging a gauntlet of gushing geysers and rain curtains and was the first of its kind roller coaster in the world. SCarowinds, the park's annual Halloween event, is introduced for the first time in October. In 2001, the park introduced three new attractions including Scooby-Doo's Haunted Mansion, an interactive ghost-busting experience through the former Harmony Hall, Pipeline Peak, the world's tallest enclosed body slide and increases the size of WaterWorks to 13 acres, and the park's first 3-D attraction, 7th Portal. Plantation Square, the park's entrance area, is remodeled into Paramount Plaza. The Wayne's World theming is removed and the area is converted to Thrill Zone. The following year saw the addition of Carolina Boardwalk, a newly themed area that takes guests on a walk through of the famous beaches of the Carolinas. Included in this area is the parks 11th roller coaster, Ricochet. After the success of Woodstock's Air Rail at sister park Kings Island, Paramount decided to build a clone at Carowinds in 2003 as part of the Happy Land of Hanna Barbera's transition into Nickelodeon Central. In 2004, Nighthawk (then known as Stealth) was relocated from California's Great America and opened as BORG Assimilator in the location previously home to Smurf Island. Nickelodeon Central was expanded in 2005.

=== Cedar Fair/Six Flags era (2006–present) ===
==== Late 2000s ====
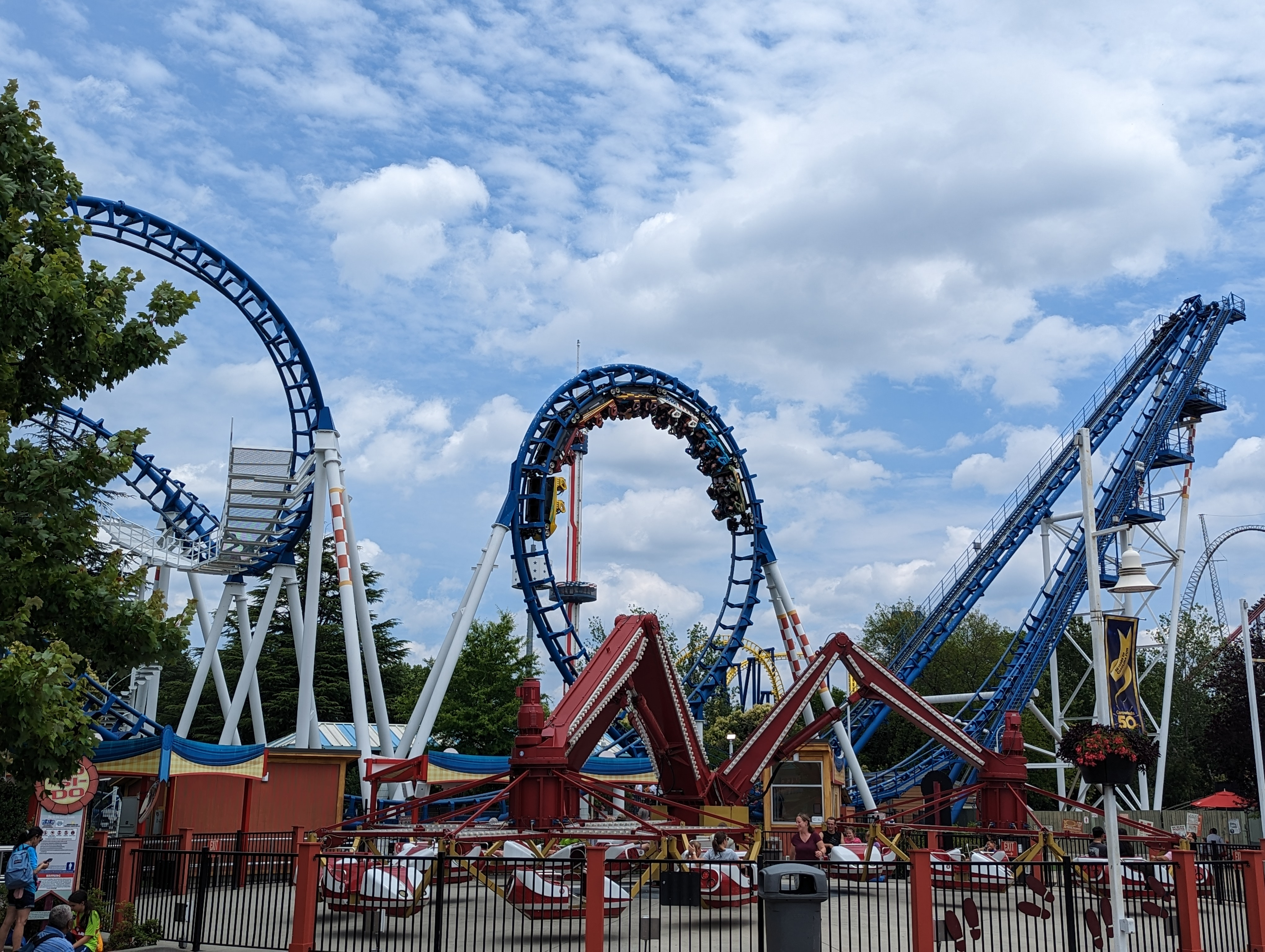
The Flying Cobras opened in 2009 after it was relocated from Geauga Lake.

On January 27, 2006, the Dayton Daily News reported that CBS Corporation (successor of the original Viacom) was interested in selling the entire Paramount Parks division, including Carowinds; CBS stated that amusement parks did not fit the company's new strategy. On May 14, 2006, Cedar Fair announced it was interested in acquiring the five Paramount theme parks from CBS Corporation. The acquisition was completed on June 30, 2006.

Although Cedar Fair continued to use the Paramount's Carowinds name through the remainder of the 2006 season, and had a ten-year option to continue using the Paramount pre-fix, it began to phase out the Paramount name in press releases, the park website, and signage within the park. All references to Paramount-owned movies were removed immediately, with the exception of Nickelodeon Central, as Cedar Fair did not own the rights to use Paramount property. Several rides were renamed and rethemed, including BORG Assimilator (now known as Nighthawk), Drop Zone: Stunt Tower (now known as Drop Tower), and Top Gun: The Jet Coaster (now known as Afterburn). WaterWorks was expanded by four additional acres and the name was changed to Boomerang Bay in 2006. The addition of a heated lagoon and a children's water slide were among the changes made to the existing water park.

In January 2007, a new logo was unveiled featuring the trademark Cedar Fair flag on the letter I in the Carowinds name, removing Paramount altogether. The Carolina Skytower was repainted to feature the colors of the American flag. In 2008, a second, larger wave pool was added to Boomerang Bay due to increased popularity. Yo-Yo, a flat ride from Carowinds' former sister park Geauga Lake, was also added to the park. The Nickelodeon Flying Super Saturator is closed and removed. The following year, Carolina Cobra was also relocated from Geauga Lake in the spot formerly home to the Flying Super Saturator and includes new trains. Multiple pathways were repaved and the landscaping around the park was also improved. Nighthawk is repainted from black and green to yellow and blue. It is announced that the Powder Keg Log Flume located near the front of the park would be removed for future development.

==== 2010s ====
In 2010, Intimidator, a 232-foot tall roller coaster, opened in the space formerly occupied by the Powder Keg Log Flume. A portion of the parking lot is re-configured to accommodate the ride's layout. Nickelodeon Central was also replaced by Planet Snoopy, introducing the Peanuts characters to the park. For 2011, the park saw general cosmetic improvements. Vortex received a new red and white color scheme, new picnic shelters were constructed in the Plaza Pavilion area, Thunder Road and Hurler had portions of their tracks reconstructed, and new seat walls, newly planted shade trees, and additional greenery was planted all around the park. In 2012, WindSeeker, a 301-foot tall swinging flat ride, opened in a filled portion of the main lagoon near Nighthawk. The park also continued to add more shade structures and replaced asphalt pathways with brick pavers throughout the park. On August 26, 2013, Cedar Fair announced a $50 million investment plan to expand Carowinds over three years starting in 2014. The expansion included a $30 million roller coaster, a $2.5 million water slide, a $7 million food complex, and $4 million to improve the park's ticket booths and front areas. The same year, the park introduced Dinosaurs Alive!, a 5-acre walkthrough attraction.

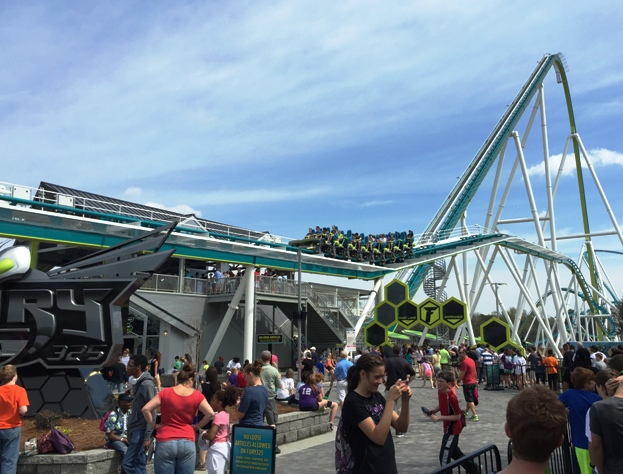
Fury 325, the fifth-tallest roller coaster in the world, opened for the 2015 season.

In 2015, Fury 325, the fifth-tallest roller coaster in the world, opened as another component of the park's previously announced "top-to-bottom" expansion program. A new front entrance replaced the original North Gate entrance of the park, the parking toll booths were replaced and expanded, and the parking lot was re-configured to accommodate the new entry plaza. Thunder Road is closed and demolished to make way for future development. In 2016, Boomerang Bay was re-themed and expanded into Carolina Harbor, removing the Australian theme. The expansion included a new six-slide complex, a new wave pool located on land formerly home to Thunder Road, and several new splash areas for kids. The original wave pool is demolished. For the 2017 season, the expansion of the County Fair area saw the addition of four new rides: Electro-Spin (a Mondial top scan), Zephyr (Zierer Wave Swinger), Rock N Roller (Mack Rides Music Express), and Do-Si-Do (HUSS Troika). Carolina Cobra was re-themed and renamed "The Flying Cobras", with a new blue and white color scheme. The park also announced that the Wings restaurant would be expanded. WinterFest, a Christmas event in November and December that previously operated in 2005, was also reintroduced.

In 2018, Planet Snoopy was expanded and converted into Camp Snoopy with the addition of six new children's attractions. The following year, Copperhead Strike, a double-launched roller coaster manufactured by Mack Rides, was opened in the all-new seven-acre Blue Ridge Junction area of the park and became the park's 14th roller coaster. Blue Ridge Junction was constructed in the area formerly occupied by WhiteWater Falls, Sand Dune Lagoon and Thunder Road's former station. A 130-room SpringHill Suites by Marriott, Carowinds' first on-site hotel, opened near the park's toll booths. Blue Ridge Country Kitchen opens in Blue Ridge Junction.

==== 2020s ====
Carowinds did not open for normal operation during the 2020 season as a result of the COVID-19 pandemic in the United States. The park hosted a new holiday event, however, called "Taste of the Season" from November 21 – December 20, 2020. The event featured food, live shows, and other holiday activities throughout the park, as well as a select number of amusement rides. The park returned to normal operation in May 2021. In 2021, Boogie Board Racer, the longest mat racing slide in the Southeast, opened in Carolina Harbor. Retirement of the Rip Roarin' Rapids ride was also announced, along with the closure of the Dinosaurs Alive! attraction, to prepare for future development.

In July 2022, Carowinds announced the closures of Plants vs. Zombies 3Z Arena, Yo-Yo, and Southern Star attractions. As part of the new Aeronautica Landing area of the park, Air Racers, The Airwalker, Gear Spin, Gyro Force, Hover and Dodge, and Wind Star were announced as their replacements for the 2023 season. Carowinds began year-round operation in 2023, including limited park operation on weekends in January and February and Flights & Bites, a seasonal offering in Harmony Hall. The park also celebrated their 50th anniversary with limited time entertainment offerings, unique food and beverage, and vintage merchandise. In accordance with their 50th anniversary milestone, Carowinds announced its new Aeronautica Landing area would open in April 2023. Aeronautica Landing, the centerpiece of Carowinds' 50th anniversary celebration, pays tribute to the Carolinas' spirit of invention and the history of flight. The new area opened on April 7. Year-round operations were discontinued at the end of the season.

On July 1, 2024, a merger of equals between Cedar Fair and Six Flags was completed, creating a new Six Flags Entertainment Corporation. As part of the merger, the corporate headquarters was relocated to Charlotte, North Carolina, five miles northeast of the park, at the same location that had served as the headquarters of Paramount Parks.

== Areas and attractions ==
=== Aeronautica Landing ===
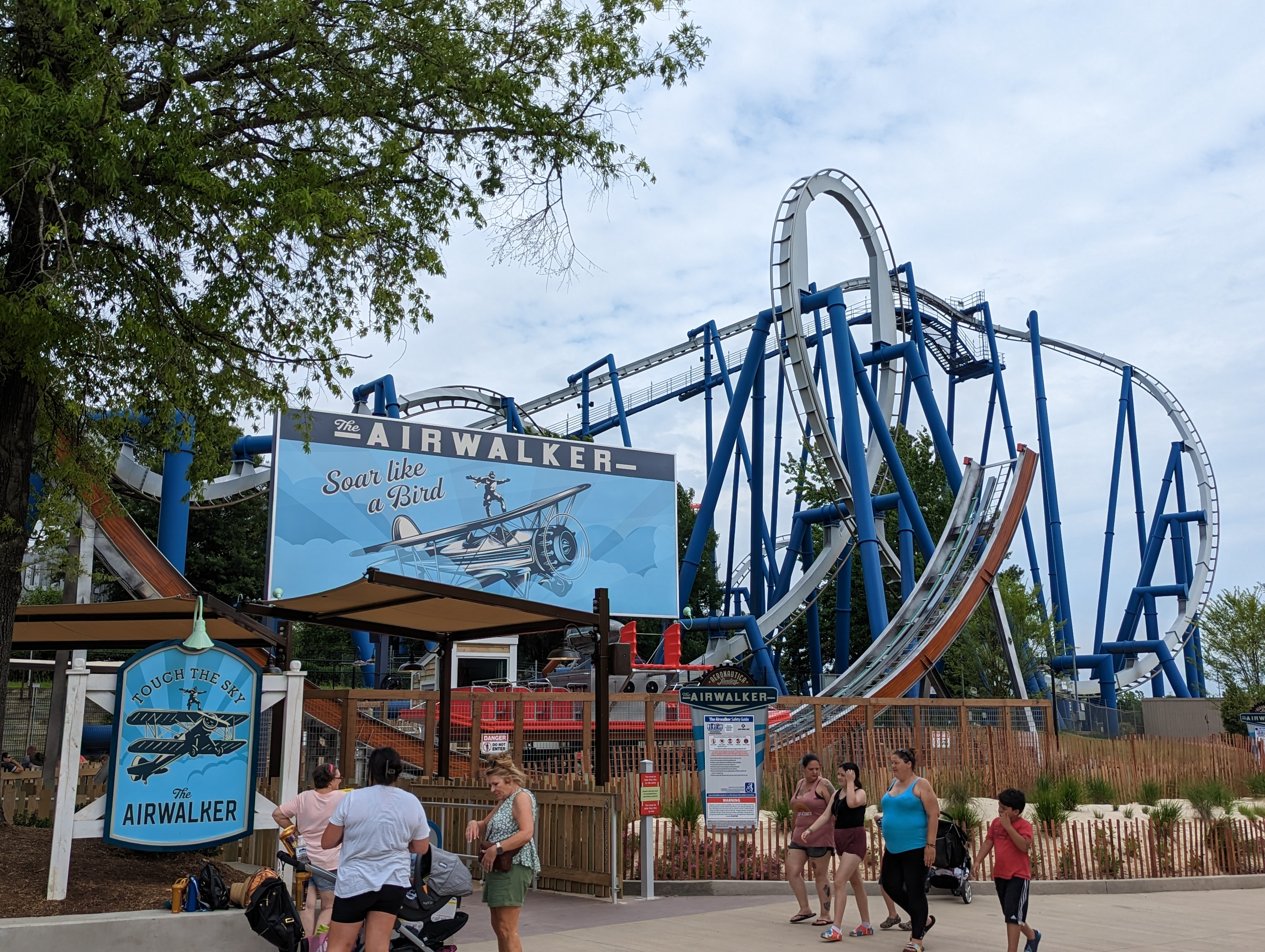
Air Walker in Aeronautica Landing with Afterburn in the background.

Ride	Year opened	Manufacturer	Description
Air Racers	2023	Zamperla	A plane-themed air racer ride with six arms that invert while the ride spins around an axis.
Gear Spin	2023	Zamperla	A NebulaZ ride that consists of four pendulums attached to the sides of a central rotating tower. The pendulums intertwine as they rotate, creating regular near-misses. At either end of each pendulum are gondolas that seat four riders in two rows back-to-back. The gondolas always remain upright.
Gyro Force	2023	Chance Rides	A trabant ride consisting of a giant wheel which tilts at a steep angle that fluctuates in a wavelike manner and spins at various speeds. Opened on June 16, 2023. Originally operated as Lady Luck at Adventureland in Iowa from 1974 to 2021.
Hover and Dodge	1979/2023	Majestic Rides	A classic bumper cars attraction. Formerly known as Autodrome (1979–1981), PT Bumper's Dodgem (1982–?), Dodg'ems (?-2022). New ride vehicles and LED lighting installed in 2023.
Airwalker	2023	Zamperla	A Disk'O ride that spins around a central axis while traveling back and forth on a half-pipe track.
Wind Star	2023	Zamperla	A WindstarZ ride that spins around a central axis, similar to Mountain Gliders (see below). Seats are fitted with glider wings, which riders can position to control the height at which they travel. Opened on June 16, 2023.

=== Blue Ridge Junction ===
Ride	Year opened	Manufacturer	Description
Copperhead Strike	2019	Mack Rides	The first double-launch coaster in the Carolinas, with five inversions. It was built in a themed 7-acre area as part of the park's largest investment in its history.
Mountain Gliders	2005	Bisch-Rocco	A Flying Scooters ride where the suspended passenger tubs would spin around a vertical axis. It previously was located in Planet Snoopy as Woodstock Gliders, and Danny Phantom's Phantom Flyers when the area was known as Nickelodeon Central. It was in storage during 2018 for Camp Snoopy expansion; in late 2018, the park announced the return of these as Mountain Gliders. They were originally built in 1940 for the Coney Island Amusement Park in Cincinnati, OH, before being moved to Kings Island (as Flying Scooters and Flying Eagles) where they operated from 1972 to 2004.

=== Camp Snoopy ===
Ride	Year opened	Manufacturer	Description
Beagle Scout Acres	2018	Miracle Recreation Equipment Company	A children's play area featuring multiple interactive elements spanning 8,000 square feet (740 m^{2}). It opened in 2018 as one of six new Camp Snoopy attractions.
Camp Bus	2018	Zamperla	A bus-themed Crazy Bus mini flying carpet ride featuring Peanuts characters. It opened in 2018 as one of six new Camp Snoopy attractions.
Charlie Brown's River Raft Blast	2025	Mack Rides	A River Battle interactive boat ride.
Charlie Brown's Wind-Up	1973	Zamperla	A miniature swing ride formerly known as Top Cat's Swing Time & Backyardigans Swing-Along.
Flying Ace Balloon Race	1987	Zamperla	A Balloon Race ride. Formerly known as Boo Boo's Balloon Race, Boots' Balloon Race & Peter Potamus' Magic Flying Balloons.
Kite-Eating Tree	2018	Zamperla	A Jumpin' Star mini drop tower for kids that gently drops riders 20 feet (6.1 m). It opened in 2018 as one of six new Camp Snoopy attractions.
Peanuts Pirates	2005	Mack Rides	A Seesturmbahn (Sea Storm Ride) with rotating pirate ships themed to Peanuts. It was relocated from sister park Canada's Wonderland where it was once known as The Great Whale of China. It was formerly known as Flying Dutchman's Revenge.
Peanuts Trailblazers	2018	Zamperla	A mini whip ride that opened in 2018 as one of six new Camp Snoopy attractions.
Pig-Pen's Mud Buggies	2018	Zamperla	A jump around ride that opened in 2018 as one of six new Camp Snoopy attractions.
Snoopy vs. Red Baron	1973	Chance Rides	A small plane ride themed to Snoopy. It was formerly known as Dastardly and Muttley In Their Flying Machines & Tommy's Take-Off.
Snoopy's Racing Railway	2025	Art Engineering	A family multi-launch coaster.
Wilderness Run	1998	E&F Miler Industries	A junior-sized roller coaster ride. It was formerly known as Taxi Jam (1998–2004), Hey Arnold Taxi Chase (2005–2009) & Lucy's Crabbie Cabbie (2009–2017).
Woodstock Express	1975	Philadelphia Toboggan Company	A junior wooden roller coaster. Formerly known as Scooby Doo, Scooby Doo's Ghoster Coaster & Fairly Odd Coaster (2005–2009).
Woodstock Whirlybirds	2018	Zamperla	A Woodstock-themed mini teacup ride that opened in 2018 as one of six new Camp Snoopy attractions.

=== Carolina Boardwalk ===
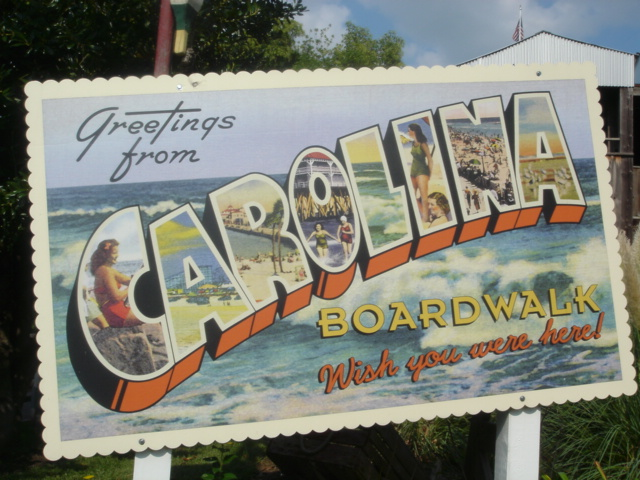
Sign for Carolina Boardwalk

Carolina Boardwalk is an area themed after a Boardwalk. It contains three rides, all of which are roller coasters.

Ride	Year opened	Manufacturer	Description
Carolina Cyclone	1980	Arrow Dynamics	A steel roller coaster featuring two vertical loops and two corkscrews. It was the first roller coaster to feature four inversions.
Carolina Goldrusher	1973	Arrow Dynamics	A steel mine train roller coaster. It was the first roller coaster at Carowinds and is only one of three original rides still operating. It is also the first roller coaster to cross state lines (North Carolina & South Carolina).
Ricochet	2002	Mack Rides	A wild mouse roller coaster with intense turns and drops.

=== Carousel Park ===
Carousel Park is the area of the park located close to the center, it has three rides.

Ride	Year opened	Manufacturer	Description
SlingShot	2015	Funtime	A reverse bungee ride that catapults riders nearly 300 feet (91 m) into the air at speeds up to 62 miles per hour (100 km/h). SlingShot is an additional charge attraction.
The Grand Carousel	1979	Philadelphia Toboggan Company	An antique carousel. Originally located in Planet Snoopy (now known as Camp Snoopy) as Character Carousel (2010–2017). The Grand Carousel was first built at the Mesker Park Zoo and Botanic Garden in Evansville, Indiana and relocated to Carowinds in 1979.
Vortex	1992	Bolliger & Mabillard	The Carolinas' first stand-up roller coaster.

=== Celebration Plaza ===
The main entry area of the park.

=== County Fair ===
County Fair is an area located near the back of the park, it is themed after an agricultural show.

Ride	Year opened	Manufacturer	Description
Do-Si-Do	2017	HUSS	A Troika ride which sends guests flying through the air and gliding up, down and around as three giant arms rotate riders in different directions – all while speed and elevation increase. It opened as part of the new County Fair area in 2017. Previously operated at Ocean Park in Hong Kong from 1984 to 2000 as Octopus and then at Loudoun Castle in Scotland from 2004 to 2010 as Crow's Nest.
Electro Spin	2017	Mondial	A Top Scan ride which sends riders through a freely rotating orbit through the air on its floorless gondolas. It opened as part of the new County Fair area in 2017.
Rock 'N' Roller	2017	Mack Rides	A Musik Express ride that plays rock and roll as guests spin around and around. It opened as part of the new County Fair area in 2017.
The Flying Cobras	2009	Vekoma	A Boomerang roller coaster. The train is pulled up the lift hill backward and then released down the hill forward into a cobra roll and vertical loop before repeating the journey in reverse. It was relocated from Geauga Lake where it was known as Mind Eraser (1996–2003) & Head Spin (2003–2007). Formerly known as Carolina Cobra (2009–2016).
Zephyr	2017	Zierer	A Wave Swinger ride that suspends guests as the ride rotates in a circular, wavelike motion. It opened as part of the new County Fair area in 2017.

=== Crossroads ===
Ride	Year opened	Manufacturer	Description
Afterburn	1999	Bolliger & Mabillard	An inverted roller coaster featuring six inversions. Formerly known as Top Gun: The Jet Coaster (1999–2007).
Boo Blasters on Boo Hill	2010	Sally Corporation	An interactive dark ride where guests shoot at targets to collect points. The building was originally the Harmony Hall theater, which housed a variety of shows. It was previously known as Scooby-Doo's Haunted Mansion (2001–2009). Received a repainted exterior and was refurbished by Sally (including repaired laser guns and a modern target system utilizing Weigl technology) for the 2023 season.
WindSeeker	2012	Mondial	A 301-foot (92 m) tower swinger ride that spins to music and a light show. It was the tallest ride ever built at Carowinds until the opening of Fury 325 in 2015. It is turned into a Christmas tree of lights during the holidays.

=== Thrill Zone ===
Thrill Zone is an area located near the front of the park. It features two roller coasters and a scrambler ride.

Ride	Year opened	Manufacturer	Description
Kaleidoscope	1973	Eli Bridge	A scrambler ride. Formerly known as Scrambler. Formerly located in Carousel Park across from The Grand Carousel (1973–2024). In 2025, it moved to Scream Weaver's old plot.
Fury 325	2015	Bolliger & Mabillard	A 325-foot (99 m) giga coaster that is the tallest in the world to use a traditional chain lift. It reaches a maximum speed of up to 95 mph (153 km/h), making it tied for the sixth fastest in the world alongside Steel Dragon 2000. In July 2023 the coaster was closed after patrons discovered a crack in a support pillar, and another crack was discovered during repairs. The repaired coaster re-opened later in the season.
Hurler	1994	International Coasters, Inc	A wooden triple out and back roller coaster. Originally themed to Wayne's World when the park was owned by Paramount. In 2014, Great Coasters International refurbished Hurler's 180-degree turn, located immediately after the ride's first descent. In late 2023 the coaster was closed so Carowinds' in-house maintenance team could rebuild Hurler's back curve to enhance the ride experience. The ride opened back up in 2024.

=== Thunder Road ===
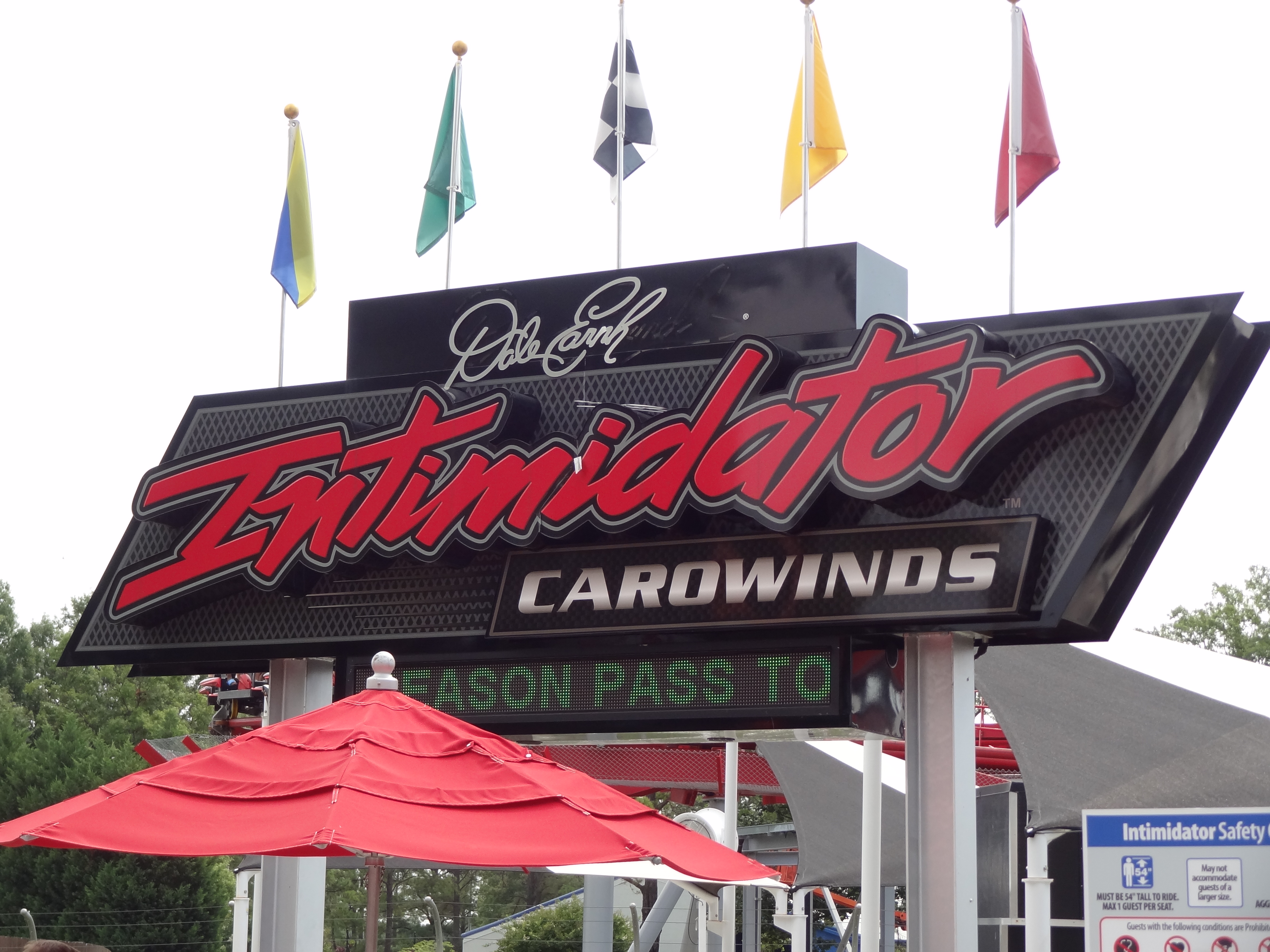
Thunder Striker opened in 2010

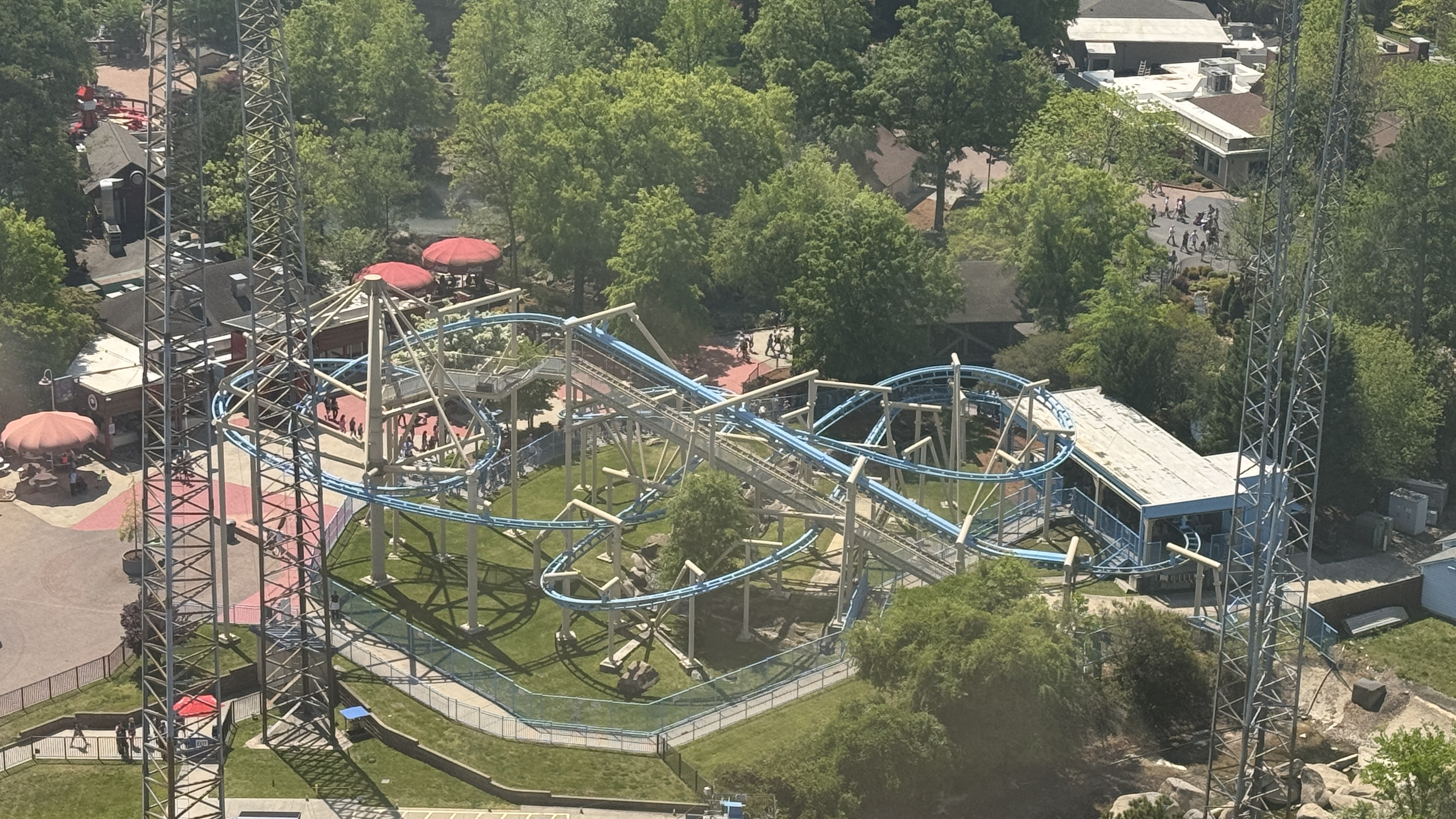
A View of Kiddy Hawk from Carolina Skytower

Thunder Road is an area of the park near Camp Snoopy, named after the now-defunct roller coaster Thunder Road.

Ride	Year opened	Manufacturer	Description
Carolina Skytower	1973	Intamin	A 262-foot (80 m) tall Gyro tower that gives guests a view of Carowinds and Charlotte. It was originally sponsored by and branded as the Eastern Airlines Skytower. Known as the North Pole during Winterfest.
Kiddy Hawk	2003	Vekoma	A 49-foot-tall (15 m), 1,122-foot-long (342 m) suspended family coaster. It opened as Rugrats Runaway Reptar (2003–2009) with yellow track and green supports, then operated as Flying Ace Aerial Chase (2010–2017) with yellow track and orange supports. For its 15th anniversary in 2018, the coaster was renamed, painted blue track with beige supports, and themed to the Wright Brothers' first flight trials at Kitty Hawk, North Carolina.
RipCord	1995	Skycoaster, Inc.	A skycoaster ride. Formerly known as Skycoaster and Xtreme SkyFlyer. This is an upcharge attraction, where guests pay an additional fee to ride. It was originally located on the site where Fury 325 is now, but was later relocated to an area near the Kiddy Hawk roller coaster.
Thunder Striker	2010	Bolliger & Mabillard	A steel hypercoaster. The 232-foot-tall (71 m) roller coaster travels up to 75 mph (121 km/h). Formerly known as Intimidator (2010–2023).

=== Carolina Harbor ===
Included in the price of admission to Carowinds is access to the 27-acre Carolina Harbor water park. Based on a Coastal Carolinian theme, it features 15 rides and attractions. It originally opened as Ocean Island in 1982, the water park has also been known as Riptide Reef (1989–1997) WaterWorks (1997–2006), and Boomerang Bay (2007–2015). On August 27, 2015, Carowinds announced an expansion for the area that added five additional attractions and resulted in the name changing to Carolina Harbor.

== Festivals ==
=== WinterFest ===
Carowinds re-introduced WinterFest for the 2017 season. This seasonal holiday event features seasonal holiday decorations, tree lighting, Christmas carolers, homemade crafts, a themed parade, and select rides. The park previously had Winterfest in 1983 when owned by Taft Attractions and again in 2005 when owned by Paramount.

=== SCarowinds ===

In September 2000 the park introduced SCarowinds. It is an annual Halloween attraction and is presented on select nights in September and October, as well as the first weekend in November. The experience includes numerous haunted attractions and incorporates most of the existing park rides into a nightmarish experience.

== Paladium ==
The Paladium is an outdoor amphitheater located at Carowinds. It opened in 1975 and was the Charlotte area's premier outdoor concert venue until the opening of Blockbuster Pavilion, now Truliant Amphitheater, in 1991. It lost most of its major acts to the Uptown Amphitheatre at the NC Music Factory (now the Skyla Credit Union Amphitheatre at AvidxChange Music Factory) when it opened in 2009, and now hosts mostly Christian bands. Admission to the Paladium is separate from admission to Carowinds.

Styx performed there in 1975, NC's Charlie Daniels Band played there in '76, Jimmy Buffett performed there in '76, and B.B. King played there in '76. Johnny Cash played there in '78, The Beach Boys played in '78, and The Allman Brothers Band played there in '79. In 1980, the Paladium hosted Tom Petty and the Heartbreakers. Eddie Money played there in '84, INXS played there in '84, John Denver played there in '86, Robert Palmer in '88, Richard Marx in 1989, and The Glenn Frey Band with Joe Walsh played there in '93. Tears for Fears played there in 1990, and C + C Music Factory performed there in '91. In '91, Chapel Hill native James Taylor played there. Bon Jovi played to a sold-out crowd at the Paladium in 1993 during a stop on their I'll Sleep When I'm Dead Tour. Screaming Trees played there with Soul Asylum in '93. It had Virginia's Dave Matthews Band in '93, UK's Depeche Mode with Stabbing Westward in '94, Athens GA's B-52's in '94, Billy Ray Cyrus in '95, Blues Traveler in '96, Coolio in '96, UK's Duran Duran in 2000, Weird Al Yankovic in '00, Smash Mouth in '00, Sugar Ray in '00, and 311 in '04. Atlanta Christian rapper Lecrae performed there in 2014 (for Rock the Park), and Skillet played in 2015.

== Fast Lane ==
Fast Lane is a virtual queue system offered for an additional charge. It was first introduced as a wristband system, before changing to a virtual queue system in 2026. Visitors can reserve a ride that allows them to access an expedited queue at many of the parks' most popular attractions.

== Carowinds Festival of Music ==
The annual Carowinds Festival of Music allows music students to perform in public, receiving comments and ratings from nationally recognized adjudicators. Bands, choirs, show choirs, and orchestras can all play for ratings. Plaques and ribbons are awarded for performances that receive ratings of superior and excellent.

== Retired rides and attractions ==
Attraction	Year opened	Year closed	Manufacturer	Description
The Wild Thornberrys' River Adventure	1973	2009	Arrow Dynamics	Initially opening as the Powder Keg Log Flume, it was a log flume with double-barrel log vehicles and included a spillway drop. The size was around 1,636 feet (498.65 m) long and was located near the park entrance in Celebration Plaza. For the 2003 phase of the Nickelodeon Central area, the Powder Keg was rethemed to The Wild Thornberrys, an animated series. After its demolition, the hypercoaster, Thunder Striker, was built in the flume's place for the 2010 season.
Thunder Road	1976	2015	Philadelphia Toboggan Coasters	A dual-tracked wooden roller coaster originally located in the current Aeronautica Landing section (former County Fair). Shares a similar track layout to The Racer at Kings Island and Racer 75 at Kings Dominion. It was demolished in favor of a water park expansion and rebranding of Boomerang Bay into Carolina Harbor for the 2016 season. Some of the coaster's track pieces and trains were donated by Cedar Fair to both The Racer and Racer 75 after Thunder Road's closure. Replaced by Copperhead Strike in 2019.
White Lightnin'	1977	1988	Anton Schwarzkopf	A weight drop-launched shuttle roller coaster that was located in Country Crossroads (current County Fair). Notable for being the only Schwarzkopf roller coaster ever installed in Carowinds, as well as being one of four shuttle loopers with a weight drop launch. It has been relocated to Gold Reef City in South Africa around 1988, currently operating as Golden Loop.
Scream Weaver	1979	2024	Anton Schwarzkopf	An Enterprise ride. It was originally located in the original County Fair area (now known as Aeronautica Landing), where it was known as Meteorite. The ride was renamed after the song Dream Weaver, a song featured in the film Wayne's World in 1994. Replaced by a relocated Scrambler in 2025.
Whirling Dervish	1979	2000	Zierer	A Wave Swinger, circular, wavelike-motioned swing ride that operated in the current Aeronautica Landing section (former County Fair). Was relocated to California's Great America and renamed "Celebration Swings" in 2001.
The Wild Bull	1979	1998	Anton Schwarzkopf	A Bayern Kurve, circular, roller-coaster-like amusement ride themed to a bullfight. Originally located in the former County Fair section of the park (currently Aeronautica Landing), the ride closed in 1998 to make way for Afterburn in 1999.
The Honey Bear Bunch Family Reunion	1980	1981	Creative Engineering, Inc.	Electronically controlled, animated animatronic stage show featuring a cast of singing and joke-telling bears, similar to the Country Bear Jamboree. Sponsored by General Mills, this was a custom-modified version of the commonly found "Hard Luck Bears" animatronic show, which itself is a predecessor of the popular Rock-afire Explosion animatronic band. Formerly located within the Harmony Hall theater (the building now occupied by Boo Blasters on Boo Hill), the animated figures were later repurposed for a live stage production of Phantom of the Opry in 1982. The current whereabouts and fate of the show are unknown.
Rip Roarin' Rapids	1982	2018	Intamin	A river rapids ride that simulated whitewater rafting, 6-seater circular rafts traversed through a long river channel containing turbulent turns and sporadic opportunities for passengers to get soaked. Formerly located within Celebration Plaza, the ride was quietly closed after the 2018 season and demolished in 2025.
WhiteWater Falls	1988	2017	Hopkins Rides	Replacing the Hillbilly Jalopies in Country Crossroads (currently Blue Ridge Junction), this flume-styled Shoot the Chute ride had a simple, rounded layout and a height of around 50 feet. The Copperhead Strike double-launch coaster has been built upon and currently resides in the space formerly occupied by WhiteWater Falls.
Snoopy's GR8 SK8	1990	2012	Chance Rides	A prototype Falling Star flat-ride model that opened as Gauntlet in 1990. It was later rethemed to Rocket Power Airtime in 2005 as part of the Nickelodeon Central expansion. The ride was finally rethemed to Snoopy's GR8 SK8 in 2010 when the area was transformed into Planet Snoopy. The location space has been occupied by the Harmony Hall food court since its 2013 inception.
Drop Tower	1996	2024	Intamin	A drop tower ride with a height of 160 feet (49 m) and a drop of 100 ft (30 m). It was originally named Drop Zone: Stunt Tower (1996–2007).
Nickelodeon Flying Super Saturator	2000	2008	Setpoint USA	Formerly located adjacent to Carolina Harbor and County Fair, this suspended family roller coaster-water ride hybrid was themed after the Nickelodeon television channel and its "Nicktoons" brand of animated programs. Riders were able to dump 4-gallon payloads of water on park guests who walked underneath the coaster's track. The ride also featured water curtains, geysers and numerous water cannons that could be aimed by park guests at passing riders on the coaster. The Flying Cobras has occupied the former ride's location since 2009.
Nighthawk	2004	2024	Vekoma	A flying Dutchman roller coaster. The coaster operated as Stealth at California's Great America before being installed at Carowinds. When moved to Carowinds, it was known as Borg Assimilator (2004–2007) and was themed after the Borg from the television show Star Trek: The Next Generation. The theming was removed when Cedar Fair acquired the park, and the ride was renamed Nighthawk.

== Timeline ==
1970–1979
- 1973: Carowinds opens on March 31; the Monorail, still under construction, opens later. Original themed areas: Plantation Square, Contemporary Carolina, Frontier Outpost, Pirate Island, Indian Thicket, Country Crossroads and Queens Colony.
- 1974: Whirling Well (Chance Rotor) is added; Double-Decker Carousel is removed.
- 1975: Happy Land of Hanna-Barbera themed area premieres. Attractions added include Scooby Doo coaster, Paladium Amphitheatre, Surfer (Tagada), Wagon Wheel (Chance Trabant), and Waltzer (a spinning flat ride).
- 1976: Thunder Road opens. 3 ft (914 mm) narrow gauge "Carowinds and Carolina Railroad" is removed.
- 1977: White Lightnin' (a Schwarzkopf Shuttle Loop coaster) opens in Pirate Island. Whirling Well renamed Oaken Bucket and moved to east midway.
- 1979: Debut of themed area County Fair. Rides added include Meteorite (Enterprise), PT Bumpem's Auto Stunt & Thrill Show (bumper cars), Whirling Dervish (Wave Swinger), Wild Bull (Bayern Kurve), and The Grand Carousel (replaced Double-Decker).
1980–1989

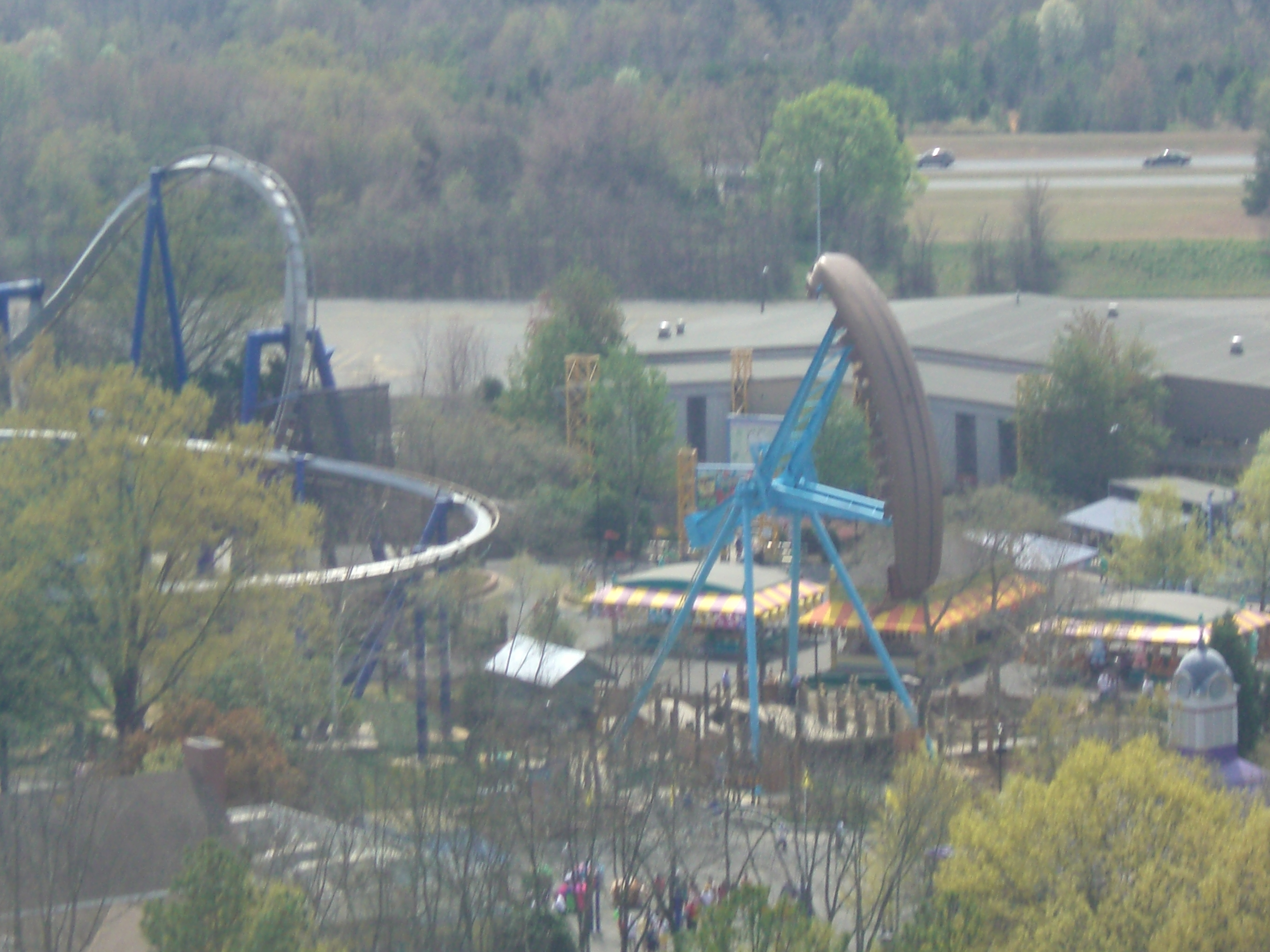
Southern Star, originally added in 1986

- 1980: Carolina Cyclone added in Frontier Outpost, and The Honey Bear Bunch Family Reunion animatronic show premieres in the Harmony Hall theater.
- 1982: Ocean Island water park debuts. Rip Roarin' Rapids water ride opens in Celebration Plaza.
- 1983: Cable Skyway (chairlift gondola ride) was removed.
- 1984: Smurf Island (themed area) debuts.
- 1985: Blackbeard's Revenge (Madhouse) was added.
- 1986: Frenzoid (Looping Starship) was added.
- 1987: Expansion of Hanna-Barbera Land with three new rides. Oaken Bucket and Old Jalopies (antique car ride) were removed.
- 1988: WhiteWater Falls (shoot the chute water ride) was added. White Lightnin' and Black Widow (Monster ride) were removed.
- 1989: Riptide Reef water park (formerly Ocean Island) debuts along with expansion of Palladium.
1990–1999

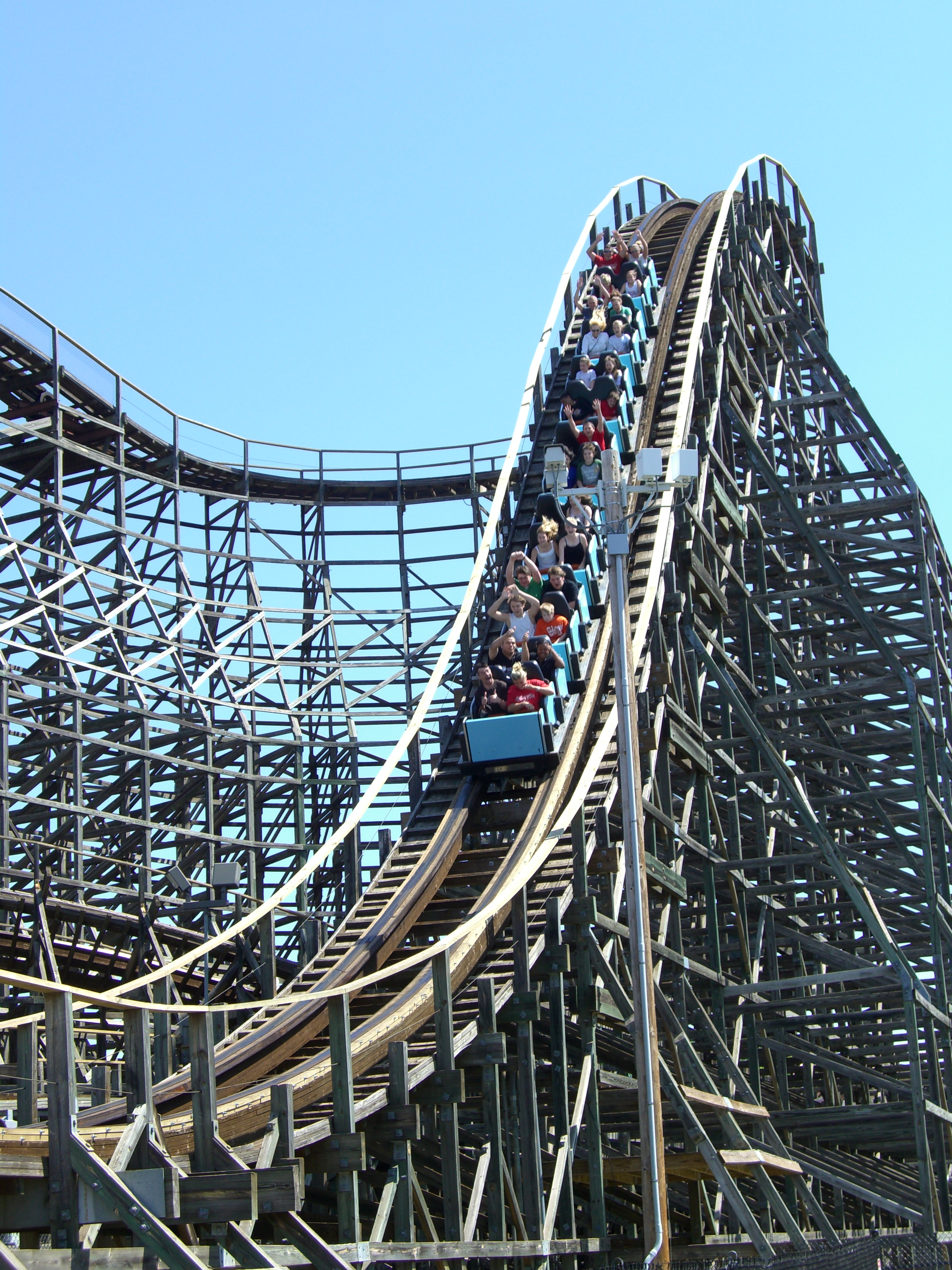
Hurler, added in 1994

- 1990: Gauntlet (shooting star, later renamed GR8 SK8).
- 1991: Expansion of Palladium; Speedway Cars removed.
- 1992: Vortex was added in the Carolina Showplace section of Carowinds.
- 1993: Action Theater was added in the County Fair section of Carowinds. Paramount Communications buys Carowinds, King's Dominion, Kings Island, Great America, and Canada's Wonderland.
- 1994: Wayne's World (later renamed Thrill Zone) section with Hurler was added and Carowinds Monorail removed.
- 1995: Xtreme Skyflyer was added in the Wayne's World (later renamed Thrill Zone) section of Carowinds.
- 1996: Drop Zone: Stunt Tower (later renamed Drop Tower: Scream Zone) was added in the Wayne's World (later renamed Thrill Zone) section of Carowinds.
- 1997: WaterWorks water park is added.
- 1998: Taxi Jam (Later renamed Lucy's Crabbie Cabbie), TV Road Trip (Later renamed Joe Cool's Driving School), and Chopper Chase (Later renamed Woodstock's Whirlybirds).
- 1999: Top Gun: The Jet Coaster (Later renamed Afterburn) was added in the County Fair section of Carowinds.
2000–2009
- 2000: SCarowinds; Flying Super Saturator (steel coaster) is added.
- 2001: SCOOBY-DOO's Haunted Mansion installed in former Harmony Hall theater building (later renamed Boo Blasters at Boo Hill); WaterWorks expansion; Stan Lee's 7th Portal 3D (feature in Action Theater); Whirling Dervish (swing ride) removed.
- 2002: Ricochet is added and the Carolina Crossroads area is re-themed to Carolina Boardwalk.
- 2003: Nickelodeon Central, featuring Rugrats Runaway Reptar (New Vekoma SFC), Wild Thornberrys River Adventure (Formerly Powder Keg Flume), and Rocket Power Air Time (Formerly Gauntlet); SpongeBob SquarePants 3D (feature in Action Theater); Carolina Sternwheeler (Original Ride) riverboat removed.
- 2004: BORG Assimilator (later renamed Nighthawk) Flying coaster added.
- 2005: Nickelodeon Central expands into Animation Station, featuring Phantom Flyers (relocated from Kings Island as Flying Eagles), Flying Dutchman's Revenge, Little Bill's Cruisers, Dora the Explorer Azul's Adventure (Formerly Yogi's Jellystone Tour) and Frenzoid removal begins in September.
- 2006: Frenzoid was removed. WaterWorks was rethemed and renamed to Boomerang Bay and converting the old Frenzoid lake into a heated lagoon. Thunder Raceway Go-Carts was built in the Thrill Zone. The Funtastic World of Hanna-Barbera (feature in Action Theater) was also added. Paramount Parks is sold to the Cedar Fair Entertainment Company for 1.24 billion dollars.
- 2007: Frenzoid was put back in as Southern Star in the County Fair section. The price for a single-day ticket dropped for the first time ever. Carolina Skytower was repainted to look like an American flag.
- 2008: A second wave pool named Bondi Beach added along with cabanas in Boomerang Bay. This added 20 acres (81,000 m^{2}) to the park making it 112 acres (0.45 km^{2}). Geauga Lake's Yo Yo swing ride was also added in the title County Fair section. Flying Super Saturator only operates on the Boomerang Bay operating calendar. Thunder Road now runs both sides going forwards again. The Flying Super Saturator is removed from the park in August.
- 2009: Carolina Cobra(later renamed The Flying Cobras), a Boomerang roller coaster featuring new trains from Vekoma, opens in the former location of the Nickelodeon Flying Super Saturator. Carowinds rebuilds more sections of Thunder Road. Nighthawk was repainted with yellow track and navy blue supports. Hurler receives some re-tracking. Scarowinds returns for its tenth year. Wild Thornberry's River Adventure removed for a new attraction. Dora the Explorer Azul Adventure's track is also modified.
2010–2019
- 2010: Intimidator(later renamed Thunder Striker): A 232-foot-tall (71 m), 5,316-foot-long (1,620 m) Bolliger & Mabillard hyper coaster replaces Wild Thornberry's River Adventure. Planet Snoopy replaces Nickelodeon Central, featuring Snoopy's Space Race, a small flying jet ride. Carolina Cyclone is repainted blue, yellow and orange. Scooby Doo's Haunted Mansion becomes Boo Blasters On Boo Hill, with new special effects; all connections to Hanna-Barbera's Scooby-Doo have been removed. Carowinds rebuilds more sections of Thunder Road. Carowinds starts replacing pavement with brick pavers to help reduce heat flow from walkways.
- 2011: Snoopy's Starlight Spectacular, a million-dollar nighttime walk-through light and sound experience featuring the Peanuts characters. Snoopy's starlight spectacular utilizes light, sound, and motion to create a full sensory experience. Snoopy's Starlight Spectacular runs from May 28 to September 4 in the County Fair and the Planet Snoopy sections of the park. Vortex receives a new red track and gray support paint scheme. Ricochet receives a touch-up paint job. Work continues on Thunder Road and Hurler's rehab and work continues on replacing pavement with brick pavers to help reduce heat flow from walkways. Carowinds has also expanded the park by 61 acres (250,000 m^{2}).
- 2012: WindSeeker, a 301-foot-tall (92 m) thrill ride opens, Fast Lane added, Joe Cool's Driving School and Southside Pavilions close.
- 2013: Dinosaurs Alive!, a walk-through Dinosaur Exhibit; Dinosaurs: Giants of Patagonia 3D (feature in Action Theater); $50 million expansion announced on August 26, to include multiple new attractions, concessions, games, and 285 jobs. This places Carowinds as the fourth largest Cedar Fair park.
- 2014: Two new slides were added to Boomerang Bay: Surfer's Swell and Dorsal Fin Drop. New Harmony Hall marketplace is built in the Intimidator field, replacing Snoopy's GR8 SK8. Chick-fil-A moves into the former Country Kitchen building and a new restaurant, "Chickie's and Pete's" replaces Outer Hanks, and Auntie Anne's takes over Plaza Funnel Cake. The former Chick-fil-A is renovated into Funnel Cake Emporium. Xtreme Skyflyer is renamed Ripcord and is relocated to Nighthawk Lake. Ricochet repainted. Go-Karts are removed and land clearing begins for a future roller coaster. Toll Plaza is removed and a new one is built further away from the park. The Plantation House entrance closes.
- 2015: Fury 325 debuts along with a new 8.2-acre (3.3 ha) main entrance plaza which was opened in association with the new coaster. Sling Shot, a new ride that catapults riders nearly 300-feet into the air at speeds up to 60 mph (97 km/h), was also added to the park in 2015. Woodstock Express and Afterburn are repainted and Thunder Road, which operated for 39 years, closes permanently on July 26, 2015. Carowinds surpasses an annual attendance of 2,000,000, becoming the fifth most-visited Cedar Fair park. The mini Golf course is removed.
- 2016: Boomerang Bay water park is expanded and renamed Carolina Harbor. Plants Vs. Zombies: Garden Warfare 3Z Arena, an interactive 3D game, debuts in Action Theater. Cirque Imagine becomes the new feature at the Carowinds Theater. Papa Luigi's Pizza is remodeled. Southern Sidewinder and Whitewater Falls are removed.
- 2017: Carolina RFD becomes County Fair with four new rides (Electro-Spin, Zephyr, Rock 'N' Roller, and Do-Si-Do); Old location of County Fair becomes Crossroads; Carolina Cobra is repainted and renamed to The Flying Cobras, and is rethemed to represent an airshow; Drop Tower repainted; Panda Express relocates to Joe's Cool Café, with old location demolished; New Game Card system is added for all games; WinterFest returns from November to December 2017. Woodstock's Whirlybirds, Woodstock Gliders, Snoopy's Space Race and Snoopy's Yacht Club are all removed.
- 2018: Planet Snoopy becomes Camp Snoopy with the addition of six new attractions, and a complete re-theme of the area. Flying Ace Aerial Chase is repainted and renamed to Kiddy Hawk. The Carolina Showplace section of the park is renamed Carousel Park to fit in with the new carousel location. WinterFest becomes a permanent seasonal event. Carowinds' first hotel, SpringHill Suites by Marriott, is announced and begins construction for a 2019 opening. Land clearing of the former White Water Falls attraction begins for future expansion. Rip Roarin' Rapids is "retired".
- 2019: Copperhead Strike, a Mack double launched roller coaster, opens in the new Blue Ridge Junction area of the park. Woodstock Gliders is renamed Mountain Gliders and returns to the park. The Wings restaurant is converted and expanded into Blue Ridge Country Kitchen with new food offerings. Burrito Cafe is renamed Carowinds Cafe. Dinosaurs ALIVE! closes permanently on August 18.
2020–present
- 2020: A portion of Woodstock Express is retracked. The park does not open for its regular season due to the COVID-19 pandemic and later re-opens in November for the Taste of the Season holiday event. Intimidator is repainted.
- 2021: Boogie Board Racer, originally announced for 2020, debuts as the Southeast's longest mat racing slide. Grand Carnivale, also originally announced for 2020, debuts. New directional signage is added throughout the park. The park is faced with a worker shortage. Carolina Skytower is repainted. Surfer's Swell and Dorsal Fin Drop are removed.
- 2022: Plants vs. Zombies 3Z Arena, Southern Star and YoYo are removed. Carolina Cyclone and Nighthawk are repainted.
- 2023: Year-round operations start, but are discontinued at the end of the season. Aeronautica Landing opens replacing Crossroads with Air Racer, Gear Spin, Airwalker, Wind Star and Gyro Force opening. Dodg'ems is renamed Hover & Dodge. On June 30, Fury 325 closes for repairs after a bystander discovers a crack in a support column; the ride reopens six weeks later. In November 2023 Carowinds amusement park owner Cedar Fair and Six Flags Entertainment Corp announced they are merging and moving the new company's headquarters to Charlotte. Snoopy's Junction is retired.
- 2024: Intimidator is renamed Thunder Striker. For the first time since its debut in 2000, SCarowinds will no longer require a separate ticket. Carowinds owner, Cedar Fair, finishes merger with Six Flags. Parent company becomes Six Flags Entertainment Corporation. Nighthawk, Drop Tower, and Scream Weaver are all retired at the end of the season.
- 2025: Snoopy's Racing Railway and Charlie Brown's River Raft Blast are added; they open up later in the season.

== See also ==
- Incidents at Six Flags parks § Carowinds
