= Woodstock Express (Carowinds) =

Roller coaster at Carowinds

- Previously known as Fairly Odd Coaster (2005-2009), Scooby Doo's Ghoster Coaster (1993-2004), Scooby Doo (1975-1993)
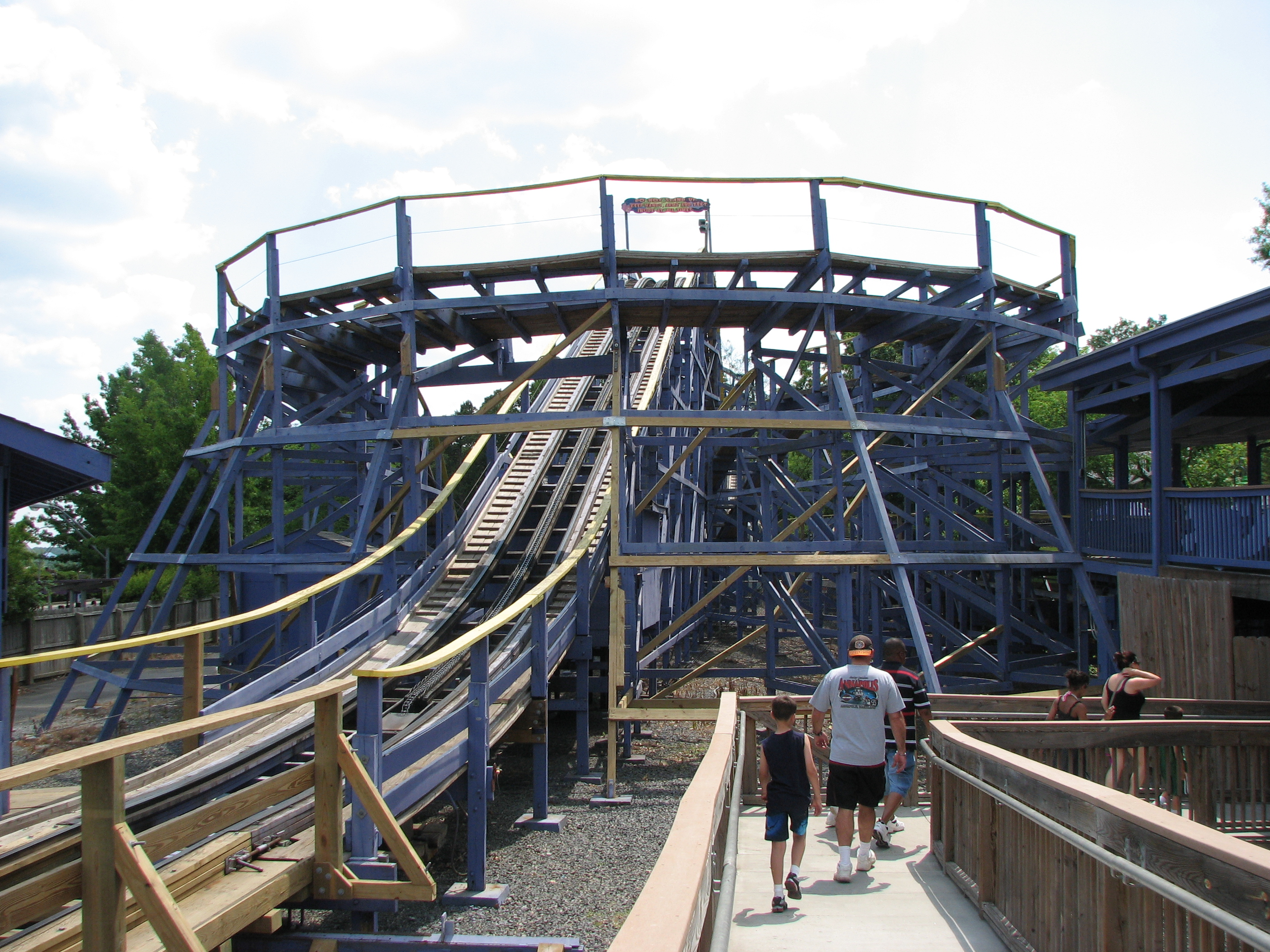
- Woodstock Express

Carowinds
- Location: Carowinds
- Park section: Camp Snoopy
- Coordinates: 35.101040°N 80.939422°W
- Status: Operating
- Opening date: 1975

General statistics
- Type: Wood
- Manufacturer: Philadelphia Toboggan Coasters
- Designer: John C. Allen
- Model: 144a
- Lift/launch system: Chain Lift
- Height: 40 ft (12 m)
- Drop: 35 ft (11 m)
- Length: 1,356 ft (413 m)
- Speed: 36 mph (58 km/h)
- Inversions: 0
- Duration: 1:00
- Capacity: 1250 riders per hour
- Height restriction: 40 in (102 cm)
- Woodstock Express at RCDB

Woodstock Express is a wooden roller coaster located at Carowinds in Charlotte, North Carolina that was formerly named after the Nickelodeon cartoon The Fairly OddParents. Though containing all of the elements of a "full-size" or standard wooden roller coaster, its short drop heights, slower speed, gently curving layout and short track length lead to its mistaken identity as a 'junior roller coaster'.

== History ==
It opened as "Scooby Doo" in 1975, loosely themed to the Hanna-Barbera cartoon of the same name in the Happy Land of Hanna-Barbera. Shortly before the park's 1993 season, the name was expanded to "Scooby-Doo's Ghoster Coaster".

In 1993, Paramount Parks bought Carowinds' parent company and added areas themed to the Nickelodeon television channel, owned by their parent company Viacom. As part of this, the Hanna-Barbera area was eventually annexed into the Nickelodeon Central area, and in 2005, the roller coaster was renamed "Fairly Odd Coaster".

As part of the new theming, the wooden superstructure was painted indigo, and the cars repainted to mimic the Fairy Oddparents characters from the show; one train pink and the other green, with the fairies' faces on the front of the cars. To depict these characters as roller coaster trains is accurate to the television show because on screen, the fairies can change their shape at will, though their faces always remain visible on whatever they become.

The coaster was renamed Woodstock Express in 2010 when the area was rethemed as Planet Snoopy. In 2015, Woodstock Express was repainted periwinkle with yellow side-rails.

== Layout ==
Woodstock Express ascends the 40-foot (12 m) chain lift hill and then travels through a series of camelback hills and slightly banked turns.

== Significance ==
Woodstock Express was recognized by the American Coaster Enthusiasts (ACE) as an "ACE Coaster Classic" but that status has since been rescinded as a result of recent changes to the coaster. Roller coasters with this designation must be wood, not steel, and meet certain operational and design criteria, including non-ratcheting lap bar restraints, no seat dividers or headrests, and free choice of seating for riders (over being assigned a seat by the operator).
