= Vortex (Carowinds) =

Steel roller coaster at Carowinds

- Vortex in October 2024

Carowinds
- Location: Carowinds
- Park section: Carousel Park
- Coordinates: 35.1036°N 80.9416°W
- Status: Operating
- Opening date: March 14, 1992
- Cost: $5.5 million

General statistics
- Type: Steel – Stand-up
- Manufacturer: Bolliger & Mabillard
- Designer: Werner Stengel
- Model: Stand-Up Coaster
- Lift/launch system: Chain lift hill
- Height: 90 ft (27 m)
- Length: 2,040 ft (620 m)
- Speed: 50 mph (80 km/h)
- Inversions: 2
- Duration: 2:19
- Height restriction: 54 in (137 cm)
- Fast Lane available
- Vortex at RCDB

Vortex is a stand-up roller coaster located at Carowinds amusement park in Charlotte, North Carolina, United States. Manufactured by Bolliger & Mabillard (B&M), the ride opened to the public on March 14, 1992. Vortex was built a year before Paramount Parks (now Six Flags) purchased Carowinds and is situated on the former site of the Carolina Speedway miniature car attraction. It was B&M's third coaster and features a loop and a corkscrew element in its relatively short track layout. Vortex represented a new era of stand-up coasters at the time, which were more advanced than the previous generation introduced in the 1980s.

== History ==
On August 15, 1991, Carowinds announced that a new stand-up roller coaster would be added to the park in 1992 called Vortex. It was the first coaster built at Carowinds since Carolina Cyclone in 1980, and also became the park's most expensive ride to date at $5.5 million. Built by Bolliger & Mabillard, Vortex was the sixth stand-up coaster to open in the United States. Construction began in September 1991, and officials believed it would be completed by January 1992. Vortex officially opened to the public on March 14, 1992.

== Characteristics ==
=== Ride Layout ===
Riders depart from the station in a standing position, then ascend a small 90-foot (27 m) lift. A pre-drop, characteristic of early Bolliger & Mabillard coasters, follows the lift hill, preceding the curved right drop. After the drop it reaches its full speed of 50 mph. A vertical loop follows the drop and is followed-up by an upward right and downward banked turn. An upward helix follows the downward turn and is followed by a corkscrew to the right. After another upward helix and a wide turnaround, the train enters the final brake run before entering the station.

=== Track ===
Vortex's track weighs a grand total of 411,000 pounds. The track supports comprise of a grand total of 109 columns and foundations, with 931 cubic yards of concrete. When the ride first opened, the track was originally colored red with black supports. In 2011, Vortex's supports were repainted to gray.

== Gallery ==
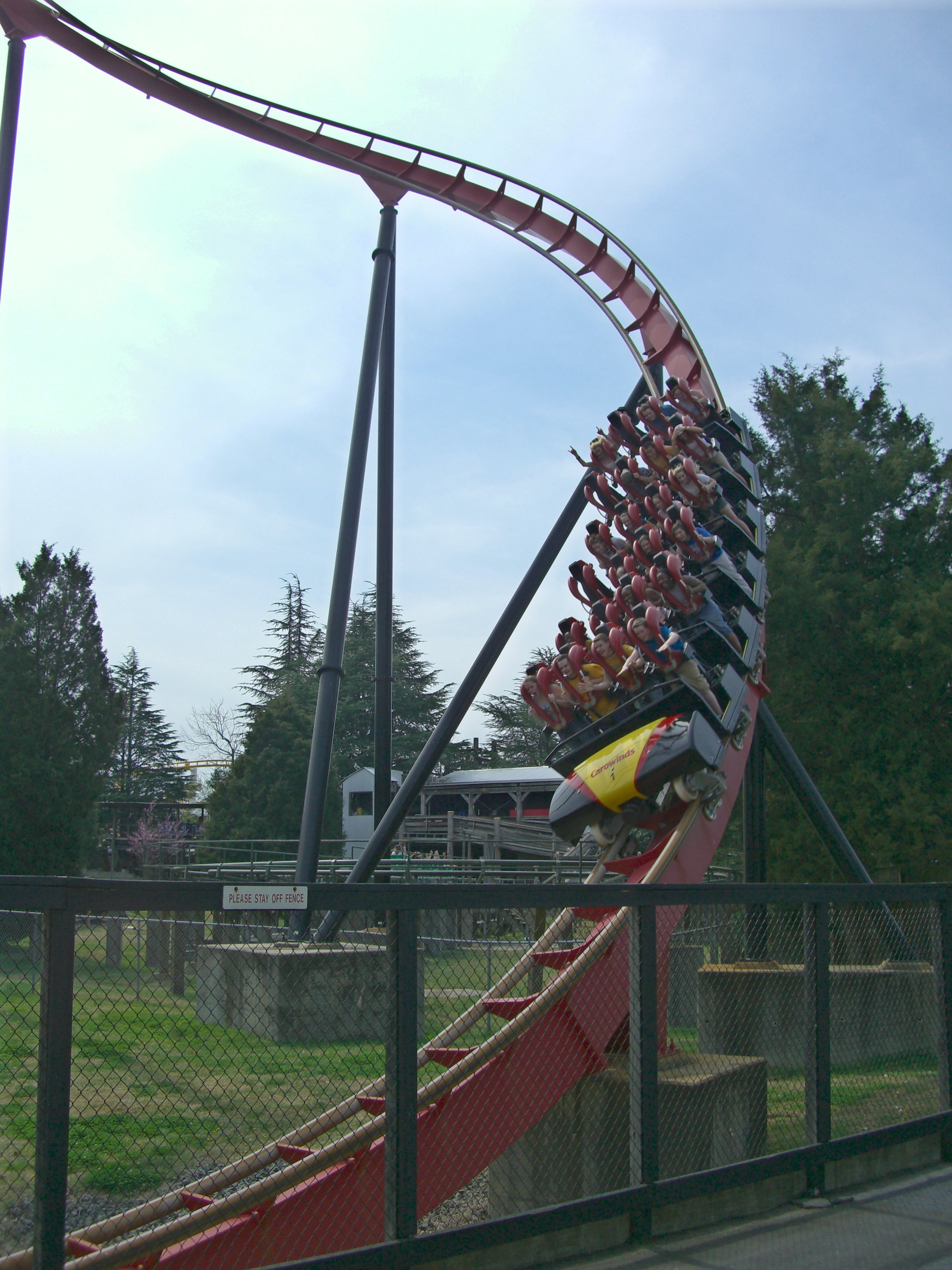
Vortex's drop

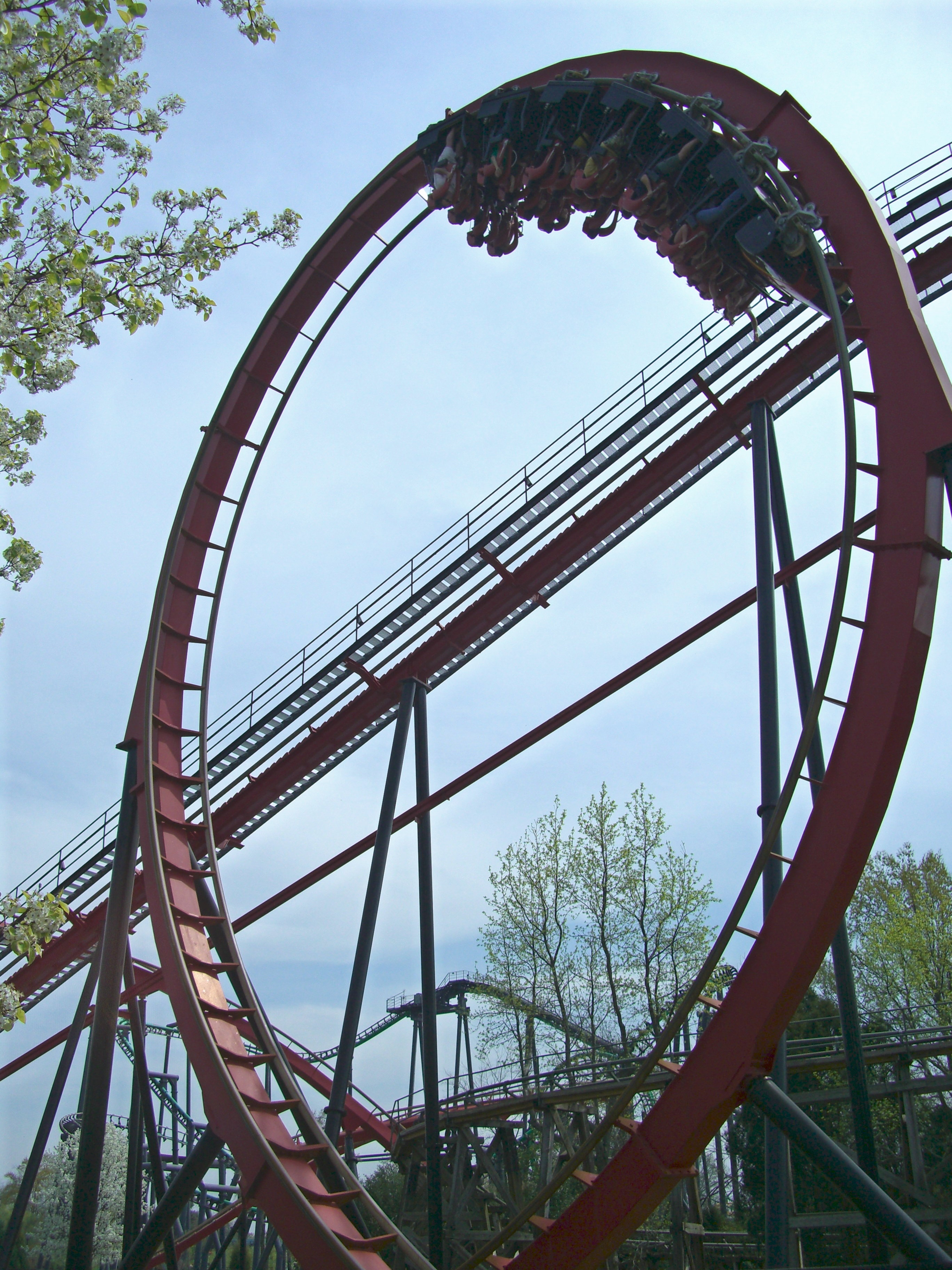
Vortex's loop

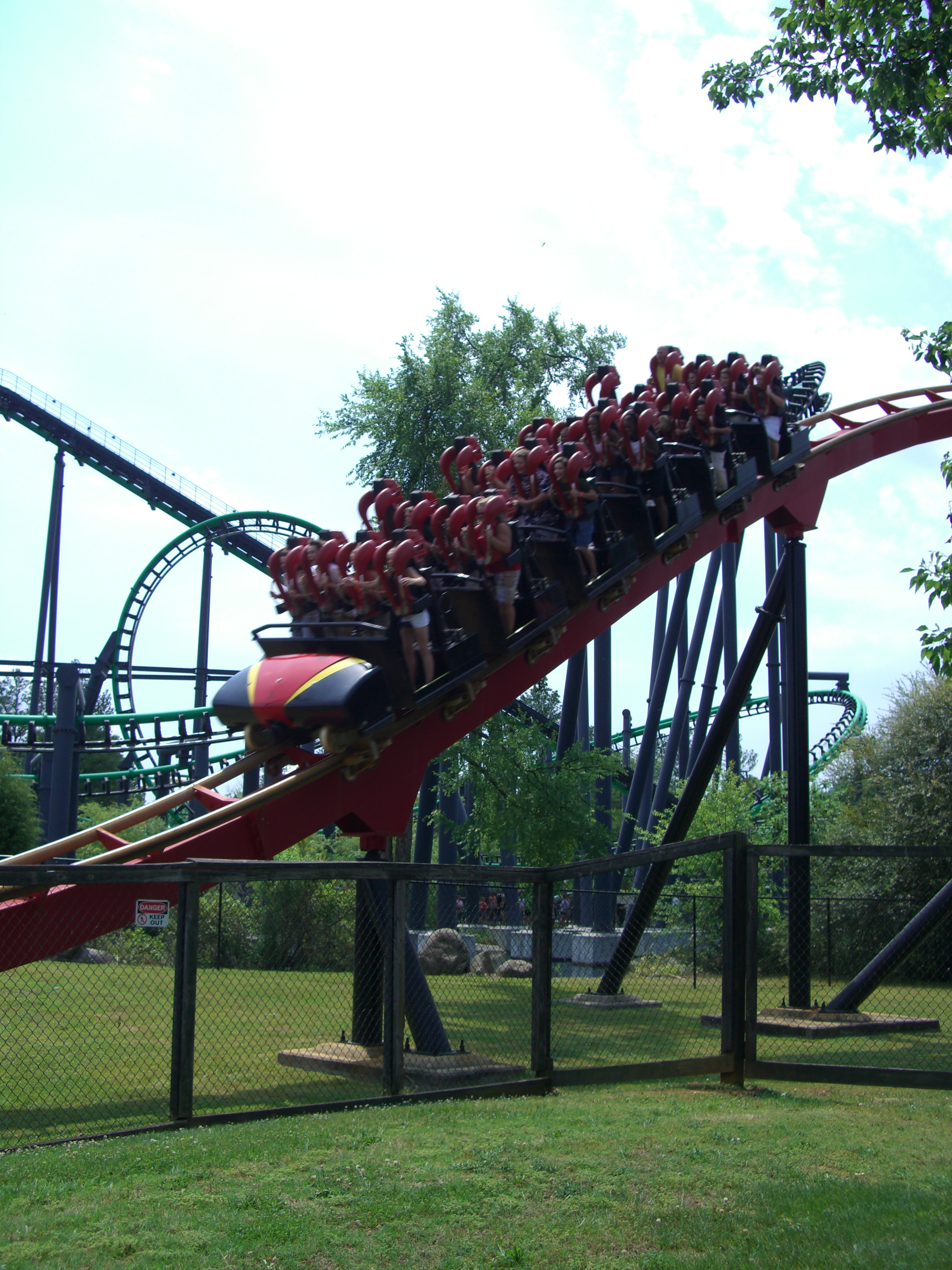
Vortex's drop directly before the corkscrew

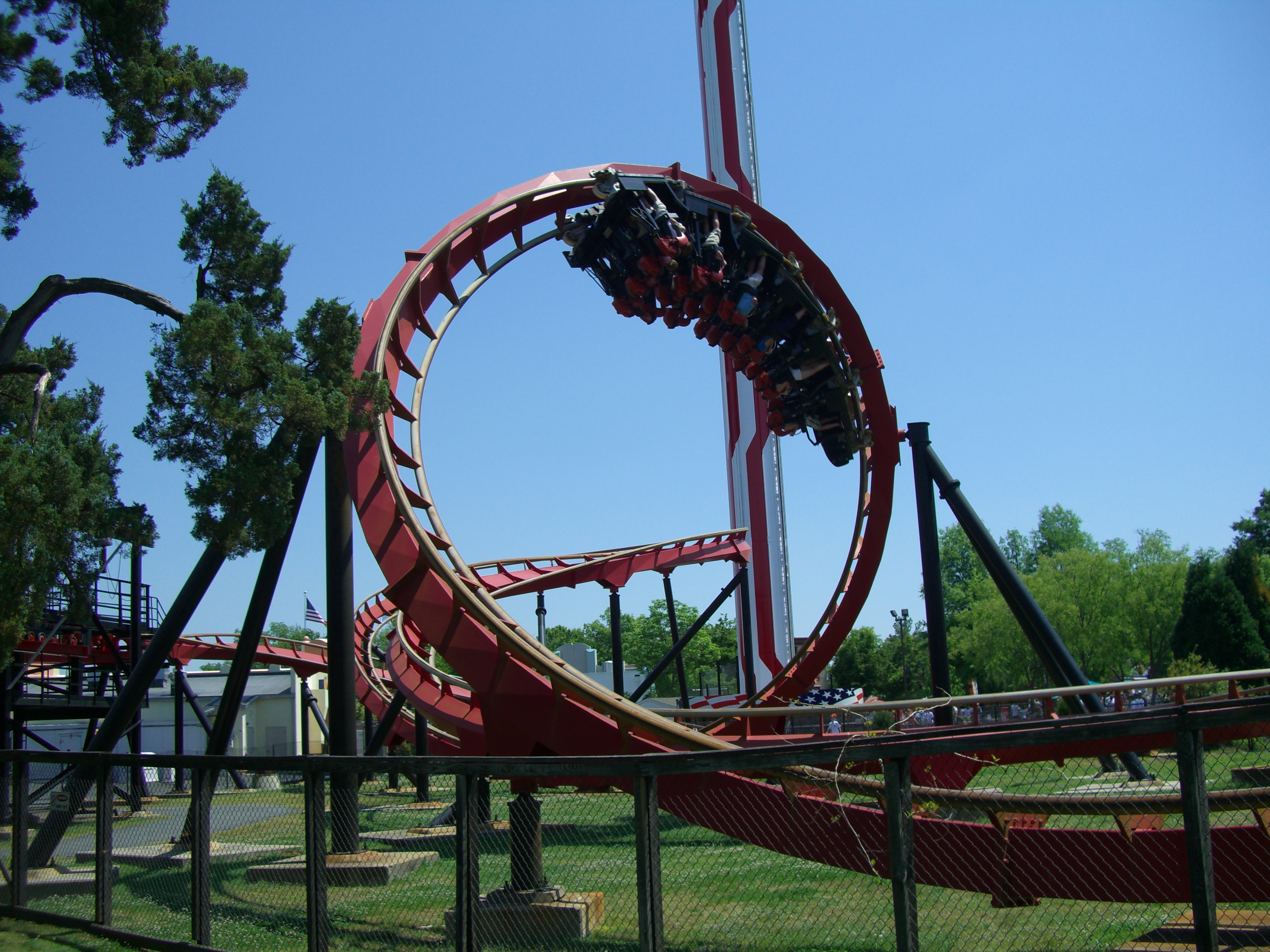
Vortex's corkscrew
