= Nickelodeon Hotels and Resorts =

Luxury family resort brand

- Official logo
- Type: Public
- Industry: Hospitality, tourism, entertainment
- Genre: Themed resort
- Founded: 2016
- Founder: Karisma Hotels & Resorts; Paramount International Networks
- Headquarters: Miami, Florida, United States
- Number of locations: 3 (as of 2025)
- Area served: Caribbean, North America, Europe
- Brands: Nickelodeon
- Services: Accommodation; Dining; Entertainment; Water park Family activities Character experiences
- Owner: Karisma Hotels & Resorts (in partnership with Paramount Skydance)
- Website: Official website

Nickelodeon Hotels & Resorts is a family resort brand themed around characters and properties from the American television network Nickelodeon. The brand is owned and operated by Karisma Hotels & Resorts under license from Paramount Skydance (formerly Paramount Global, ViacomCBS and Viacom). It offers accommodations and activities related to Nickelodeon brands like SpongeBob SquarePants.

The first Nickelodeon Hotels & Resorts property opened in Punta Cana, Dominican Republic, in 2016. This was followed by one opening in Riviera Maya, Mexico, in 2021, and in 2025, The Land of Legends opened in Antalya, Turkey. A fourth location is in development for Everest Place in Orlando, Florida for a 2028 opening, and a fifth location is currently in development for a 2029 opening in Garden Grove, California.

== History ==
The idea for Nickelodeon-branded resorts originated in the early 2000s, when Nickelodeon explored themed entertainment ventures beyond television, including water parks and family resorts. Its first experiment in the hotel sector was the Nickelodeon Family Suites by Holiday Inn, located near Walt Disney World in Orlando, Florida. That property operated from 2005 to 2016, featuring themed rooms, character meet-and-greets, and slime-themed entertainment before closing and being rebranded as a Holiday Inn Resort. During that time, Nickelodeon tried unsuccessful to complete a series of Marriott-branded resorts.

Following the closure of the Orlando resort, Nickelodeon partnered with Karisma Hotels & Resorts to launched Nickelodeon Hotels & Resorts Punta Cana, which opened on June 15, 2016. Karisma and Nickelodeon expanded the concept to Mexico's Riviera Maya, opening a second resort in August 2021. Both resorts featured immersive Nickelodeon-themed attractions, including “Aqua Nick” water parks, live entertainment, and the brand's signature “Slime” experiences.

In 2023, Karisma and Paramount Skydance announced additional expansions, including new developments in Antalya, Turkey, which opened in 2025, and Orlando, Florida, scheduled to open by 2028 as part of the “Everest Place” development in Kissimmee, and a fifth location is currently in development for a 2027 opening in Garden Grove, California. In 2024, it was announced that the property in Punta Cana would be renovated and enhanced.

== Concept and design ==
Nickelodeon Hotels & Resorts combines what has been described by Karisma as a luxury resort atmosphere with architecture and décor inspired by Nickelodeon's most popular franchises, such as SpongeBob SquarePants, Dora the Explorer, PAW Patrol, and Teenage Mutant Ninja Turtles.

As with the intended Marriott collaboration, Nickelodeon Hotels and Resorts' hallmark attraction is Aqua Nick, a large water park included in each resort.

Dining is presented under Karisma’s "Gourmet Inclusive" program, emphasizing the cuisine, themed restaurants, and drinks included in the resort rate. While primarily aimed at families, the resorts also include adult-focused spaces such as spas, cocktail lounges, and private beach areas.

== Partnership and management ==
Nickelodeon Hotels & Resorts is developed and operated by Karisma Hotels & Resorts, a Miami-based hospitality company with properties in Latin America and the Caribbean. Karisma manages the day-to-day operations, marketing, and guest experience. Nickelodeon licenses its characters, branding, and entertainment concepts for integration into the resorts.

== See also ==
- Paramount Skydance Corporation
- Nickelodeon
- Holiday Inn Orlando Suites - Waterpark
