= Land of Legends (disambiguation) =

Land of Legends may refer to:

== Places ==
- Land of Legends, a museum in the Lejre Municipality, Denmark
- The Land of Legends, an amusement park in Antalya, Turkey
- Land of Legends Raceway, a speedway in Canandaigua, New York

== Other uses ==
- Land of Legends, 2022 Russian film
