= SpongeBob's Crazy Carnival Ride =

Interactive dark ride

Circus Circus Las Vegas
- Status: Operating
- Cost: US$6,000,000
- Opening date: March 1, 2024; 2 years ago

The Land of Legends
- Area: Nickelodeon Land
- Status: Operating
- Opening date: March 1, 2025

Tersane Istanbul
- Area: Nickelodeon Play!
- Status: Operating
- Opening date: November 28, 2025

Ride statistics
- Attraction type: Interactive dark ride
- Manufacturer: Sally Corporation
- Theme: SpongeBob SquarePants; Carnival games

SpongeBob's Crazy Carnival Ride is an interactive dark ride at the Circus Circus hotel and casino in Las Vegas, Nevada. The ride was first announced in August 2023 and promotional material was previewed at an International Association of Amusement Parks and Attractions event in November 2023. The attraction, themed to the characters of the Nickelodeon cartoon SpongeBob SquarePants, is licensed by Paramount Global. The ride was manufactured by Sally Corporation and it opened on March 1, 2024.

A duplicate of the ride opened on March 1, 2025, at The Land of Legends, an amusement park in Turkey, but the characters speak in English instead of Turkish.

== Background ==
The attraction centers around the characters of the animated television series SpongeBob SquarePants. The ride is themed to a traveling carnival established by Mr. Krabs, an entrepreneurial crab that operates the Krusty Krab fast food restaurant in the show. SpongeBob SquarePants, the show's titular character, is paired with Patrick Star and included in the ride's plot as an assistant to his employer, Mr. Krabs. Instead of bringing supplies for the carnival as told, SquarePants accidentally brings Krabby Patty hamburger ingredients instead; this leads to the main antagonist, Plankton, trying to steal the Krabby Patty formula, a recurring theme in the show.

The ride features fifteen scenes and six animatronics, one being Mr. Krabs as a carnival barker. The attraction also uses video projection and includes interactive targets.

== History ==
The concept for Spongebob's Crazy Carnival Ride was first revealed to the public via a press release in August 2023, including an announcement that the ride would be manufactured by Sally Corporation with the help of TEAM Construction at a cost of US$6,000,000. The attraction was promoted with a preview center at an International Association of Amusement Parks and Attractions expo in November, including an animatronic of SpongeBob character Mr. Krabs depicted as a carnival barker.

On March 1, 2024, the attraction opened with a ribbon-cutting ceremony hosted by Circus Circus officials.

== Ride Experience ==
At the ride's entrance, an animatronic Mr. Krabs invites guests to enter. In one of the queue videos, Spongebob and Patrick notices that the guests are here, but discover that they packed Krabby Patty ingredients instead of carnival equipment. When Squidward tells the two to hurry and get everything ready, they decide to use the ingredients as carnival equipment instead. In another queue video, Mr. Krabs tells the guests what to do during the ride, but Plankton hijacks the video and intends to collect some of the ingredients so he can discover the Krabby Patty secret formula.

Once guests board the ride vehicle, Plankton emerges from a box with a butterfly net, ready to catch some of the ingredients that the guests will be using as ammo. The ride vehicles stop at four shooting games run by Spongebob, Patrick, and Squidward where they must shoot as many targets as they can before the vehicle moves on to the next game. Plankton will attempt to catch some of the ingredients, to which players can shoot him to gain extra points. The ride vehicles then pass Spongebob cooking Krabby Patties as they play the last shooting game, which is to fire Krabby Patties into Patrick's mouth, with Spongebob also providing extra targets. Mr. Krabs eventually stops the game as he considers this a waste of money. The guests then pass Plankton on a jet pack, who had managed to obtain a Krabby Patty. Mr. Krabs discovers this, but Plankton escapes on a small hot rod. The ride becomes a motion simulator as the guests chase Plankton around Bikini Bottom. After following Plankton back to the Chum Bucket, the guests find him using a machine to analyze the Krabby Patty. Spongebob and Patrick arrive on a Patty Mobile and urge the guests to stop Plankton. After the guests shoot and destroy the machine, foiling Plankton's plan, they are taken to the ride's final video screen where Plankton is locked in a cage and Mr. Krabs, Spongebob, Patrick, and Squidward show the guests their final scores. Once Mr. Krabs learns that Spongebob and Patrick used Krabby Patty ingredients in the carnival games, he proceeds to chase them down. The guests then return to the loading area.

== See also ==
- Nickelodeon in amusement parks
