= Cartoon Network Hotel =

Cartoon Network themed Hotel in Lancaster, Pennsylvania

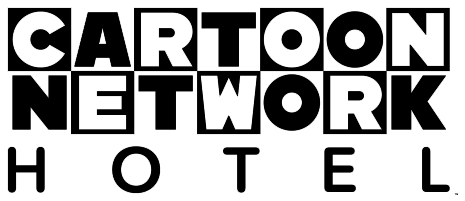

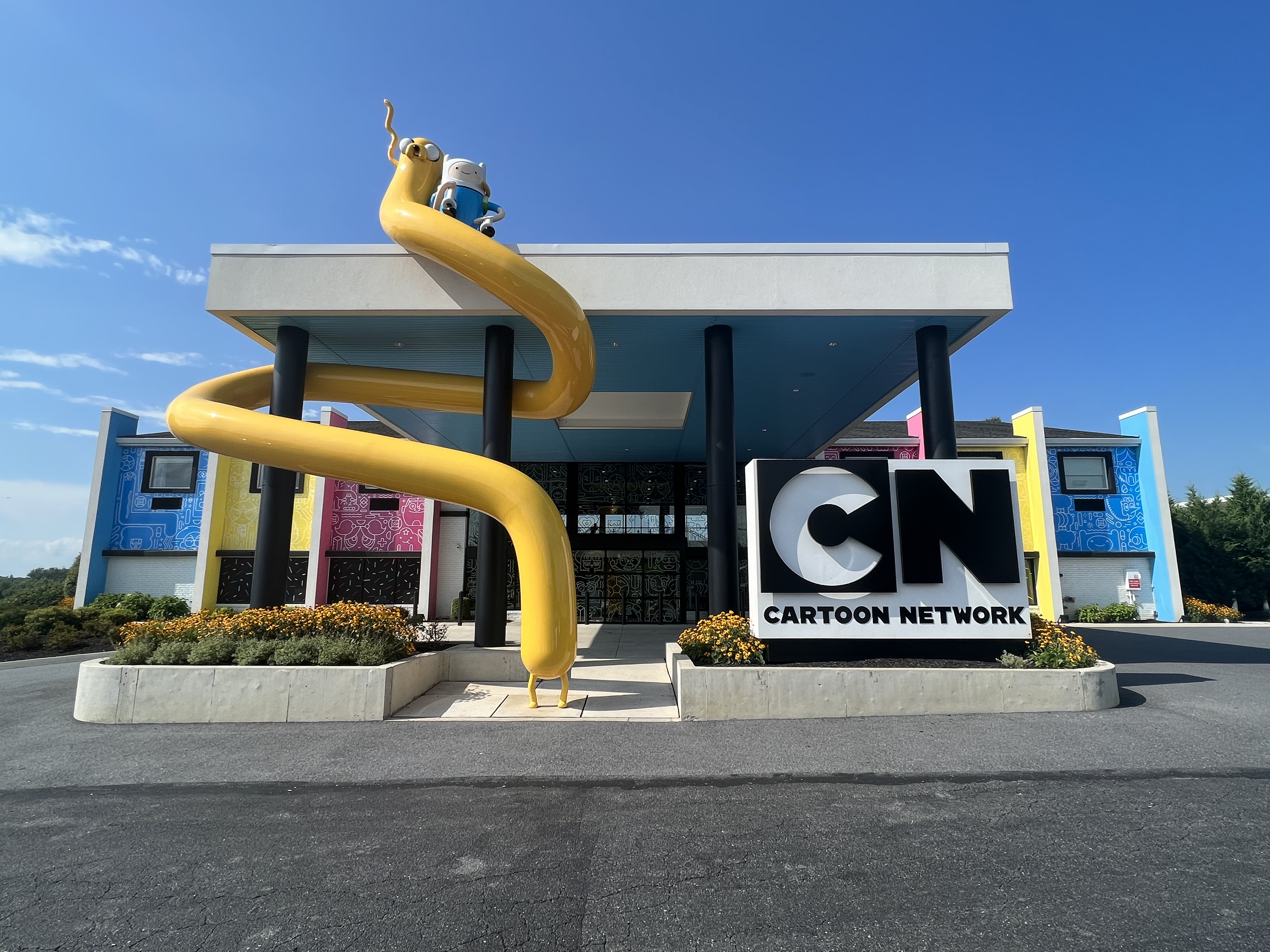
- The hotel's facade in 2022

General information
- Location: East Lampeter Township, Pennsylvania
- Opening: January 10, 2020
- Closed: January 1, 2026
- Owner: Palace Entertainment (2020–2025); Herschend (2025), under a license from Cartoon Network (Warner Bros. Discovery)

Technical details
- Floor count: 2

Other information
- Number of rooms: 165

Website
- Official website

The Cartoon Network Hotel was a resort-style hotel located in East Lampeter Township, Pennsylvania. Managed by Herschend, who licensed the Cartoon Network name and properties from Warner Bros. Discovery, it was Cartoon Network's second entry into the hotel business after an experience at Hotel Cozzi Ximen Tainan, in Tainan, Taiwan.

The hotel opened on January 10, 2020, and consisted of 165 remodeled hotel rooms, a resort-style pool, kids' play area, indoor arcade, coffee lounge, full bar, and a gift shop with Cartoon Network-related merchandise. The Cartoon Network Hotel ceased operations on January 1, 2026 after a 6-year run.

== History ==
The hotel opened as a Ramada Inn in 1971, primarily on land owned by Earl Clark, owner of the Dutch Wonderland theme park located close by. The motel ran into financial trouble and was sold to Michael Gleiberman in 1974.

The Gleiberman family renamed the motel the Continental Inn. The hotel consisted of 165 hotel rooms, along with a tennis court, an outdoor and indoor pool, free breakfast, a game room, and a fitness room. It operated until January 2018 when Palace Entertainment, the owners of nearby Dutch Wonderland, purchased the hotel for $4.7 million with the intention of remodeling it into a family-friendly resort.

In October 2018, a partnership formed between Turner's then-owned Cartoon Network and Palace Entertainment to convert the former Continental Inn into the first Cartoon Network Hotel, to open in Summer 2019. In March 2019, despite the dissolution of Turner Broadcasting System, the hotel retained the Cartoon Network brand with an agreement with WarnerMedia. In January 2020, after delays, the hotel opened.

The Cartoon Network Hotel's first year of operation was significantly disrupted by the COVID-19 pandemic in Pennsylvania. The hotel, which had just opened on January 10, 2020, was forced to close temporarily due to public health restrictions, remaining shuttered for almost five months. It officially reopened on August 3, 2020, with numerous new COVID-19 safety measures.

== Closure ==
The hotel closed on January 1, 2026, and was rebranded as the Dutch Wonderland Inn, transitioning into a themed lodging property directly associated with the adjacent Dutch Wonderland amusement park.

The primary reason cited for the closure and subsequent rebranding was the expiration of the licensing agreement between Palace Entertainment and Cartoon Network (a subsidiary of Warner Bros. Discovery).

On January 12, 2026, Cartoon Network Hotel deleted its Instagram and Facebook accounts.

== See also ==
- The WB Abu Dhabi, Curio Collection By Hilton
- Nickelodeon Family Suites by Holiday Inn
