= Hotel Cozzi Ximen Tainan =

Hotel in Tainan, Taiwan

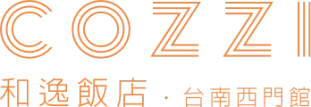

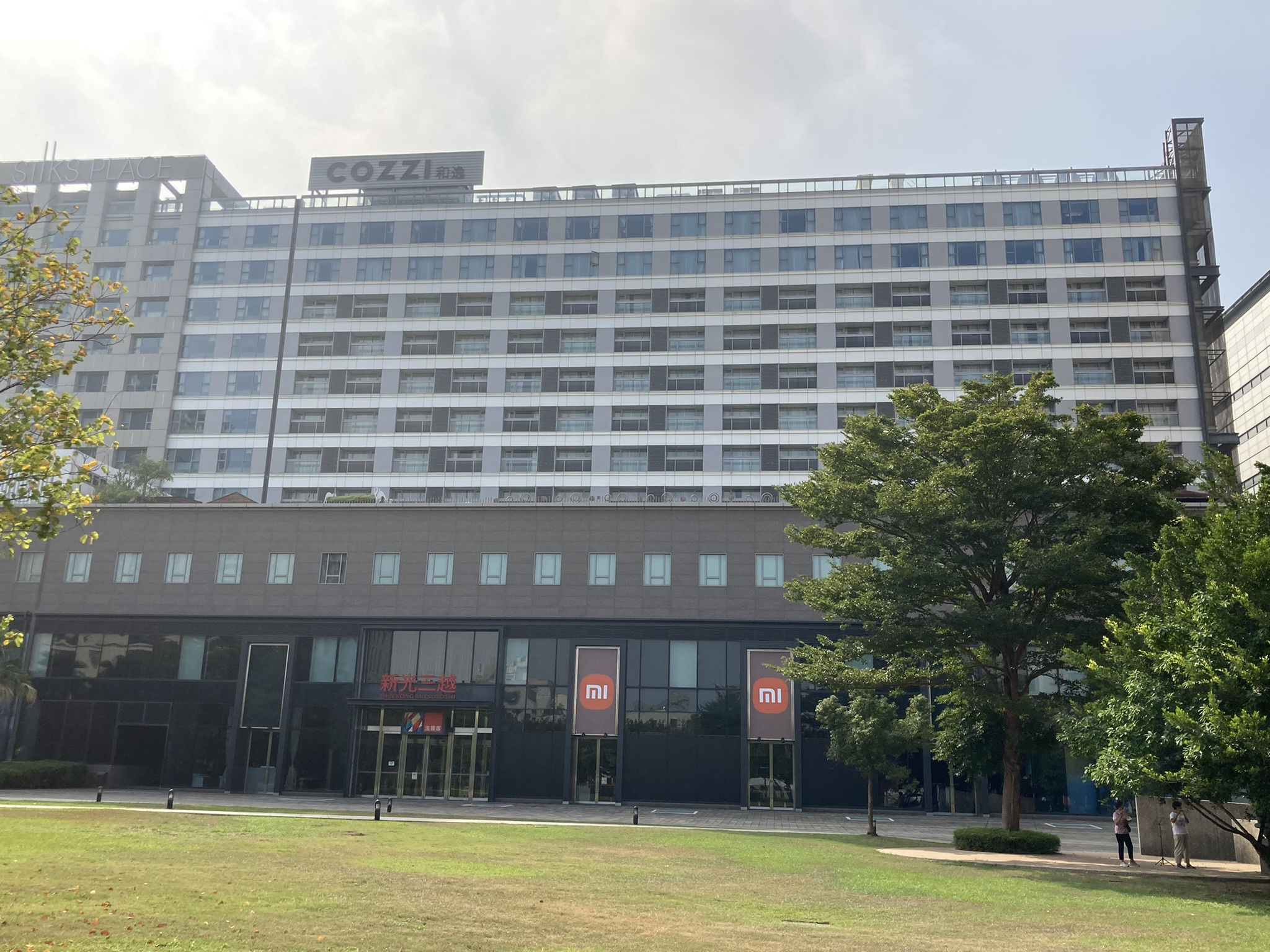
- The hotel's facade in 2022

General information
- Location: West Central District, Tainan City, Taiwan
- Opening: 2015; May 29, 2019 (Cartoon Network Experience)
- Owner: Cathay Hospitality Management, under a license from Cartoon Network (Skydance Corporation)

Technical details
- Floor count: 13

Other information
- Number of rooms: 220 (54 Cartoon Network themed rooms)

Website
- Official website

The Hotel Cozzi Ximen Tainan (Chinese: 和逸飯店‧台南西門館) is a themed hotel located in Tainan, Taiwan, known for its partnership with the global entertainment brand Cartoon Network. The collaboration transformed several floors and public areas of the hotel into an immersive environment featuring popular Cartoon Network characters and shows.

== History ==
Hotel Cozzi Ximen Tainan, originally opened in 2015 under Cathay Hospitality Management, underwent a significant rebranding through a partnership with Cartoon Network (a subsidiary of WarnerMedia). This collaboration resulted in the hotel being transformed into Asia's first Cartoon Network-themed family accommodation experience.

The Cartoon Network-themed experience officially opened on May 29, 2019.

== Cartoon Network Branded Experience ==
The hotel offers a selection of 54 Cartoon Network themed rooms, which are located on the 6th and 7th floors. These rooms feature characters and scenes from popular franchises, including Adventure Time, The Powerpuff Girls, or We Bare Bears, with the total number of themed rooms comprising 18 exclusive wallpaper designs.

=== Public and Recreational Areas ===
The Cartoon Network theme is fully integrated into the hotel's shared and recreational spaces. The entrance features a large, 3.5-meter-tall sculpture of Finn and Jake from Adventure Time, serving as a central thematic landmark.

The Cartoon Network Party Café functions as the themed on-site restaurant, where characters from Adventure Time, The Powerpuff Girls, and We Bare Bears decorate the dining area.

An entire floor is dedicated to the Indoor Recreation Area, which is divided into distinct zones: The "Adventure Time Candy Kingdom" section includes attractions such as a Bubble Ball Pit, a Candy Library, and a Bubblegum Game Wall. The "We Bare Bears Fun Land" is styled to resemble a farmers' market, featuring interactive elements related to Grizzly, Panda, and Ice Bear.

Outdoors, the expansive 1,650-square-meter Funky Field playground incorporates the theme into its facilities. Key features include "The Powerpuff Girls Sandbox," the "We Bare Bears Station" which operates a mini-train, and the "Adventure Time Playhouse." The outdoor area also provides electric car tracks and a fountain pool.

== See also ==
- Cartoon Network Hotel
- The WB Abu Dhabi, Curio Collection By Hilton
