= Worldwide Day of Play =

Annual event by Nickelodeon

Production
- Running time: 3 hours

Original release
- Network: Nickelodeon
- Release: October 2, 2004, 21 years ago

Related
- Let's Just Play Go Healthy Challenge

Worldwide Day of Play is an annual event produced by Nickelodeon, designed to encourage children and parents to turn off the electronics and play together, especially outdoors. The yearly event officially began on October 2, 2004, and has been broadcast on all Paramount Skydance-owned children's channels: Nickelodeon, Nick GAS (until 2007 because of its New Year's Eve closure), Nick Jr. Channel (formerly known as Noggin until its 2009 rebrand), TeenNick (formerly known as The N until its 2009 rebrand), Nicktoons, and NickMusic. From 2006 to 2007, the event was designed as a finale for Nickelodeon's six month-long Let's Just Play campaign. In addition, Nick.com would have special features for children to learn how to stay active and healthy.

International editions of the event have also been broadcast on its versions in Germany, Benelux, Greece, and Eastern Europe.

Following a four-year hiatus, the event returned on September 30, 2023. The latest event was held on September 26, 2026.

== General purpose ==
The event encourages children to turn off their TV and mobile devices and be physically active outside. Schools and educational organizations have also been encouraged to host events around this theme.

From 2004 to 2017, Nickelodeon suspended programming across all of its digital TV channels, Nickelodeon, Nick Jr., Nicktoons and TeenNick along with its websites from 12PM to 3PM (ET/PT) encouraging children and families to "get up, go outside and play." According to Viacom, the owner of the kids' networks at the time, millions of children and parents were expected to participate in "thousands of events in dozens of countries" in 2013.

From 2006 to 2007, when the Let's Just Play campaign ended in September, Nickelodeon aired the Worldwide Day of Play as the finale during the last Saturday of September. Nickelodeon and its sister channels suspend programming for three hours from 12PM to 3PM (ET/PT). During the time there was no programming, a special message would appear on the screen. There was no Let's Just Play campaign in 2008, though the Worldwide Day of Play was held that year.

Starting in the 2018 edition, all of the Nickelodeon networks no longer used the "Off-Air" screens. After the 2019 event, it was on a four-year hiatus, returning in 2023.

== New episodes of Nickelodeon series ==
After Nickelodeon resumed airing, they usually aired marathons and premieres of their series, including SpongeBob SquarePants. In 2007, SpongeBob SquarePants, along with Just Jordan, Tak and the Power of Juju, Zoey 101, iCarly, and Back at the Barnyard, aired new episodes. Following in 2008 was the second-season premiere of iCarly and the finale of My Family's Got GUTS. Following in 2009 were new episodes of iCarly and True Jackson, VP, and in 2010, iCarly and Big Time Rush aired new episodes. Later followed in 2011, new episodes of iCarly, Big Time Rush and Supah Ninjas aired. In 2012, before the Worldwide Day of Play begins, new episodes of Teenage Mutant Ninja Turtles and Kung Fu Panda: Legends of Awesomeness aired as well as a I Play Because special honoring the Worldwide Day of Play after Nickelodeon resumed programming, along with the hour-long iCarly episode "iShock America" premiere later that night with the premiere of See Dad Run following iCarly. For 2013, new episodes of Sanjay and Craig and Rabbids Invasion aired prior to the event, while new episodes of Sam & Cat and The Haunted Hathaways were shown that evening. In 2014, new episodes of Sanjay and Craig and Breadwinners were shown before the event, while new episodes of The Haunted Hathaways, Henry Danger, Nicky, Ricky, Dicky & Dawn, The Thundermans, and AwesomenessTV were shown in the evening. In 2015, new episodes of Henry Danger, Game Shakers, and 100 Things to Do Before High School had aired that evening. In 2016, season premieres of Henry Danger, Game Shakers, and School of Rock had aired that evening. In 2017, new episodes of Henry Danger and Game Shakers had aired that evening. In 2018, a new episode of Henry Danger aired that evening. In 2019, the second part of the two-part, final-season premiere of Henry Danger and a new episode of the revived All That aired that evening.

== Appearances ==
Special guest appearances were arranged for the Worldwide Day of Play. Guests have included then-First Lady Michelle Obama. Other guests included cast members from original Nickelodeon series including Power Rangers: Samurai and Big Time Rush. Nick Jr.'s musical group The Fresh Beat Band also made an appearance.
