= Nickelodeon Resorts by Marriott =

Proposed resort

General information
- Location: Liberty Station (United States) San Diego, California
- Opening: 2010 (planned)
- Owner: Nickelodeon (Viacom)

Other information
- Number of rooms: 650

Website
- nickmarriottpress.com (defunct)

Nickelodeon Resorts by Marriott was a proposed Nickelodeon-themed multi-resort to be developed by Viacom (owner of Nickelodeon), Miller Global Properties, LLC (resorts developer and owner - the company also owned Nickelodeon Suites Resort), and Marriott International (resort operator).

== Planned opening ==
The first hotel, announced in June 2007, was slated to open in 2010 at San Diego's Liberty Station. Six hundred fifty rooms were planned, a 100,000-square-foot (9,300 m^{2}) water park, and some attractions. This was to be the first of 20 resorts to be under construction by 2020. The architecture firm Gensler was commissioned for the project. The VPs over at Marriott saw the project as a great opportunity to develop waterpark hotels. Gensler had developed a 'Kid Modern' concept for the new hotel.

The project was the first family friendly resort planned in San Diego in the past fifty years. The investment envelope for the construction was $300 million and was to be built where a long-term parking lot for Lindbergh Field passengers stood.

The project was approved after Nickelodeon had experimented with a pilot hotel, the Nickelodeon Family Suites by Holiday Inn in Orlando (also managed by Miller Global Properties) since 2005.

A year later, in 2008, Nickelodeon created the Nickelodeon Family Cruise through a partnership with Royal Caribbean, part of its move (along with the resorts) to extend its presence in the vacation industry.

The project was cancelled in 2009 amid the Great Recession.

== Evolution ==
Following the closure of the Nickelodeon collaboration with Holiday Inn in Orlando in 2016, Nickelodeon partnered with Karisma Hotels & Resorts to launch Nickelodeon Hotels & Resorts Punta Cana, which opened on June 15, 2016.

Karisma and Nickelodeon expanded the concept to Mexico's Riviera Maya, opening a second resort in August 2021. Both resorts featured immersive Nickelodeon-themed attractions, including “Aqua Nick” water parks, live entertainment, and the brand's signature “Slime” experiences.

In 2023, Karisma and Paramount Skydance announced additional expansions, and the project is still ongoing as of 2026.
