= Let's Just Play Go Healthy Challenge =

American reality television series

- Country of origin: United States
- No. of seasons: 2
- No. of episodes: 13

Production
- Running time: 30 minutes

Original release
- Network: Nickelodeon
- Release: April 30, 2006 – September 29, 2007

Let's Just Play Go Healthy Challenge is an American reality television series, which aired on Nickelodeon from April 30, 2006 to September 29, 2007. The series featured children over a six-month period in the quest to make their lives healthier.

== Support ==
The Let's Just Play Go Healthy Challenge was mostly supported by the network and The Alliance for a Healthier Generation, an initiative between the Clinton Foundation and the American Heart Association.

Additionally, Nickelodeon and The Alliance for a Healthier Generations formed the Go Healthy Challenge Champions Network, a group of organizations that also supported the show. They include the American Heart Association, American Diabetes Association, the National Association of Physical and Sports Education, National Recreation and Park Association, and the National Rural Health Association. They give support by helping to increase participation and awareness of the campaign.

== Worldwide Day of Play ==
When the six-month period ended in September, Nickelodeon aired the finale on the last Saturday of September as the Worldwide Day of Play, a yearly event for children and parents to turn off their TV and go outside and play. Nickelodeon and their sister networks went off the air for 3 hours from 12 noon to 3PM ET/PT during the event.
