= The WB Abu Dhabi =

Seven-story hotel in Abu Dhabi

The WB Abu Dhabi, Curio Collection By Hilton
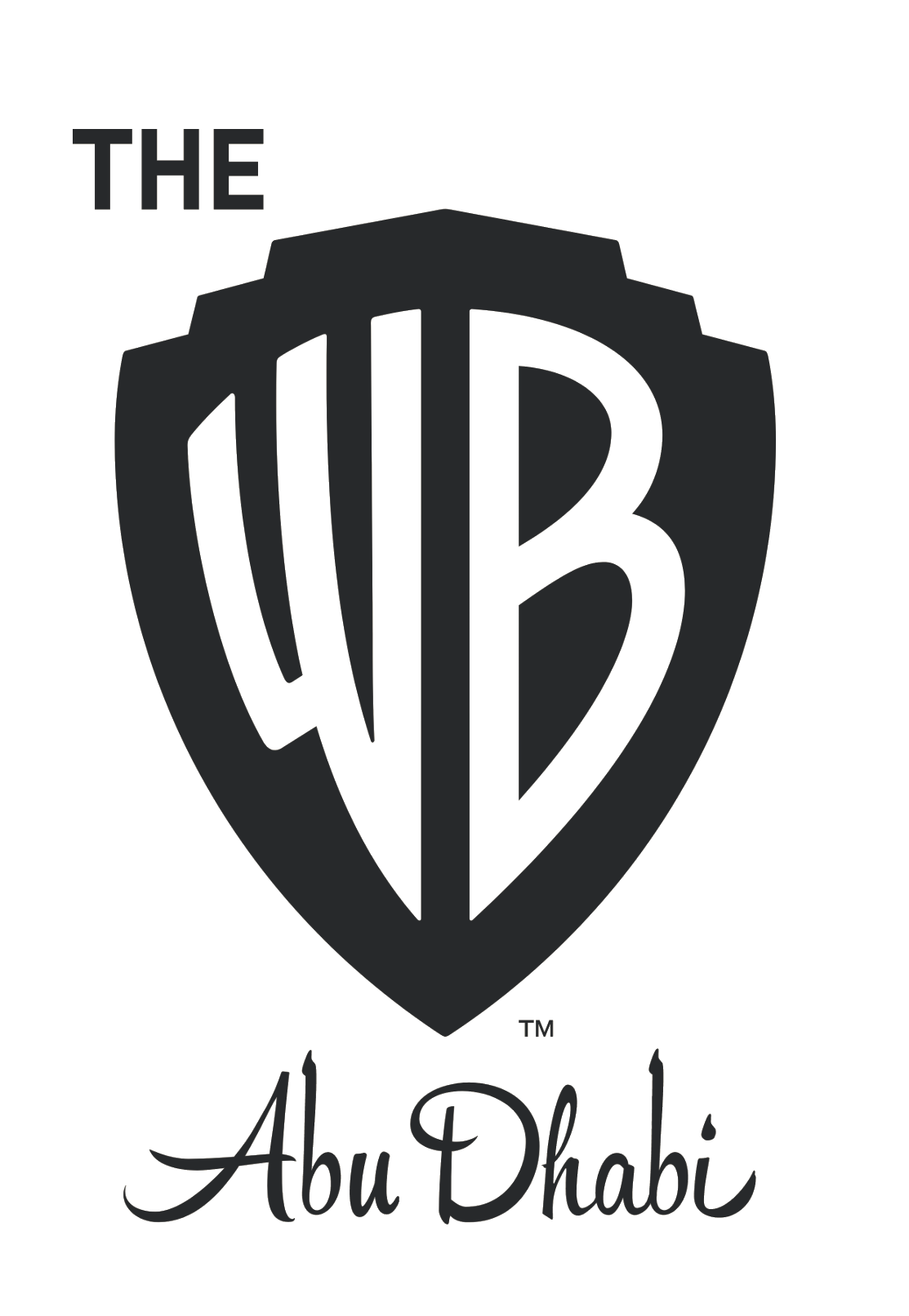

- The hotel's facade in 2022

General information
- Location: Yas Island, Abu Dhabi, United Arab Emirates
- Opening: November 11, 2021
- Owner: Miral Asset Management under a license from Warner Bros. Entertainment (Warner Bros. Discovery)

Technical details
- Floor count: 7

Other information
- Number of rooms: 257

The WB Abu Dhabi, Curio Collection By Hilton is a seven-story luxury hotel in Abu Dhabi to accompany Warner Bros. World Abu Dhabi. The hotel has 156 rooms and 156 serviced apartments, with all the rooms being themed to Warner Bros. properties like Looney Tunes and DC. The hotel was originally expected to open by 2020, but in December 2019, it was announced that the hotel would open in 2021.

== History ==
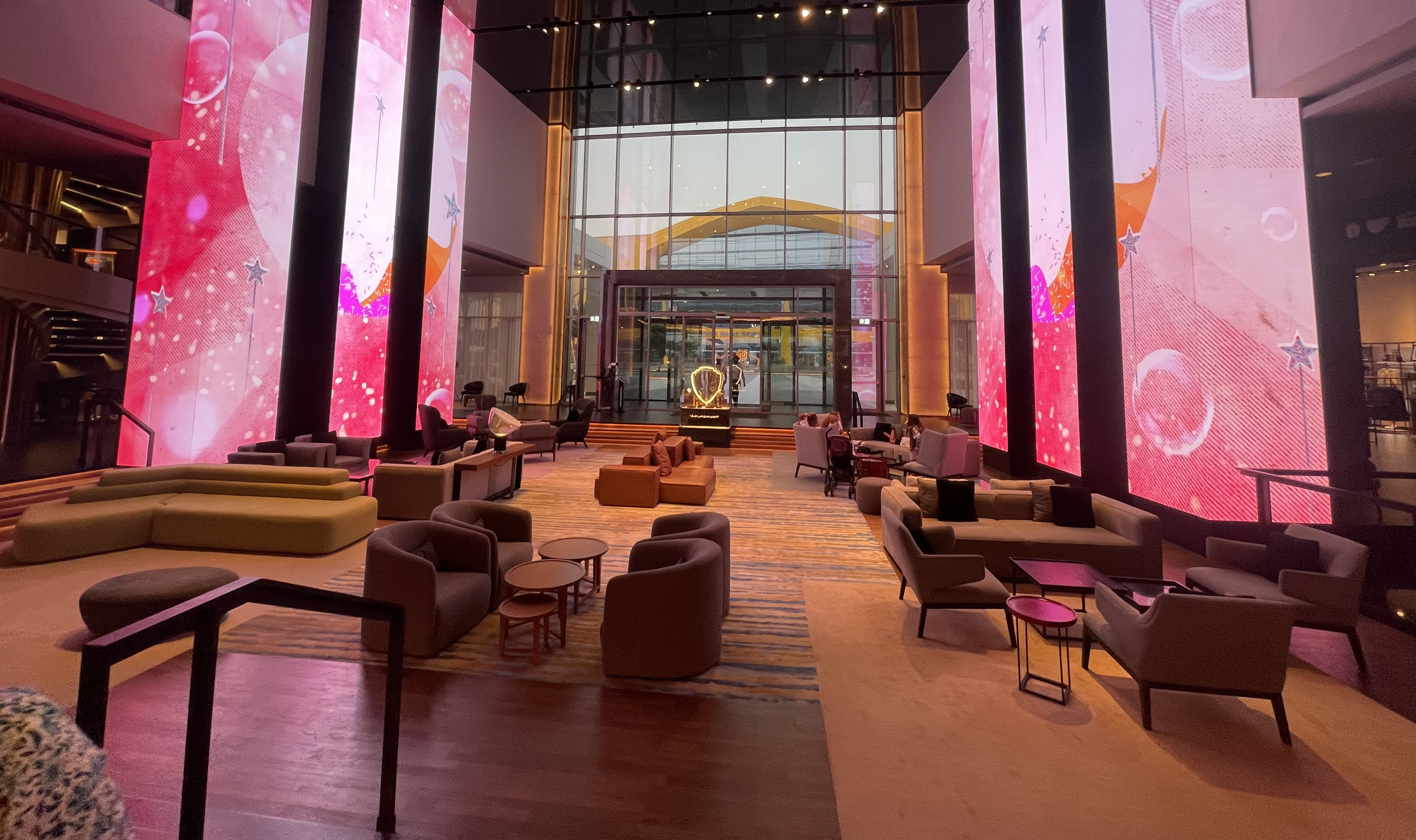
Hotel lobby

The hotel was first announced November 2018, but official artwork was not released until December 2019. On January 16, 2020, Miral Asset Management announced via LinkedIn, "We are pleased to announce that we have recently achieved a significant construction milestone - the topping out of the last concrete for The WB Abu Dhabi Hotel."

On October 11, 2021, it was revealed that the hotel would be operated by Curio Collection.

The WB - Abu Dhabi opened its doors on November 11, 2021.

== See also ==
- Warner Bros. World Abu Dhabi
- Cartoon Network Hotel
- Hotel Cozzi Ximen Tainan
