= List of Nickelodeon novelizations =

The following is a list of novelizations based on Nickelodeon Original Series and Nickelodeon Original Movies.

== Nickelodeon original series ==
=== CatDog ===
==== Chapter books ====
#	Book	Author	Release date	Episode(s) featured
#1	Romancing the Shriek	Annie Auerbach and Greg Crosby	July 1, 1999	
#3	The Perfect Bone	Terry Collins	2000	
#4	Way Off Broadway	Greg Crosby and Brad McMahon	2000	
#7	Cooking with CatDog	Annie Auerbach and Gary Johnson	June 1, 2000	
#8	The Most World Records	Annie Auerbach and Gary Johnson	August 1, 2000	
#9	A Rancid Little Christmas	Terry Collins and Mel Grant	October 1, 2000	

=== Hey Arnold! ===
==== Chapter books ====
#	Book	Author	Release date	Episode(s) featured
#1	Arnold for President	Richard Bartlett and Tim Parsons	September 1, 2000	
#2	Return of the Sewer King	Craig Bartlett and Maggie Groening	September 1, 2000	
#3	Arnold's Valentine	Craig Bartlett and Maggie Groening	January 1, 2001	
#4	Parents Day	Craig Bartlett and Maggie Groening	February 1, 2001	
#5	Summer Love	Craig Bartlett and Maggie Groening	May 1, 2001	
#7	Arnold's Christmas	Richard Bartlett and Maggie Groening	October 1, 2001	
#8	Arnold's E-Files	Richard Bartlett and Maggie Groening	December 1, 2001	

=== iCarly ===
==== Series novelizations ====
#	Book	Author	Release date	Episode(s) featured
#1	iHave A Web Show	Laurie McElroy	March 1, 2009	iPilot & iWant More Viewers
#2	iWanna Stay	Laurie McElroy	March 1, 2009	iWanna Stay With Spencer & iSpy A Mean Teacher
#3	iWant A World Record	Laurie McElroy	May 1, 2009	iWant A World Record & iGot Detention
#4	iAm Famous	Laurie McElroy	September 1, 2009	
