= Nickelodeon =

American children's pay television channel

- Logo used since March 4, 2023 (Note: The logo's wordmark has been in use since September 28, 2009. The variant displayed is meant for white backgrounds; the main variant has a white wordmark in conjunction with a fully orange splat.)
- Country: United States
- Broadcast area: United States
- Headquarters: One Astor Plaza; New York City, U.S.

Programming
- Languages: English; Spanish (via SAP audio track)
- Picture format: 1080i HDTV (downscaled to letterboxed 480i for the SDTV feed)

Ownership
- Owner: Skydance
- Parent: Nickelodeon Group
- Sister channels: List: Nick at Nite; Nick Jr.; NickMusic; Nicktoons; TeenNick

History
- Founded: December 1, 1977; 48 years ago
- Launched: April 1, 1979; 47 years ago
- Founder: Vivian Horner
- Former names: C-3 (1977–1979)

Links
- Website: nick.com

Availability (channel space shared with nighttime programming block Nick at Nite)

Streaming media
- Affiliated Service(s): Paramount+, Pluto TV
- Other Service(s): DirecTV Stream, FuboTV, Hulu + Live TV, Philo, Spectrum TV Stream, YouTube TV

Nickelodeon (commonly shortened to Nick) is an American pay television channel and the flagship property of the Nickelodeon Group, a corporate umbrella within the television division of Skydance. Launched on April 1, 1979, as the first cable channel for children, it is primarily aimed at children and adolescents aged 2 to 17, along with a broader family audience through its programming blocks.

The channel began as a test broadcast on December 1, 1977, as part of QUBE, an early cable television system broadcast locally in Columbus, Ohio. On April 1, 1979, the channel was renamed Nickelodeon and launched to a new nationwide audience, with Pinwheel as its inaugural program. The network was initially commercial-free and remained without advertising until 1984. Nickelodeon gained a rebranding in programming and image that year, and its ensuing success led to it and its sister networks MTV and VH1 being sold to Viacom in 1985.

Nickelodeon began expanding as a franchise model with the addition of sister channels and program blocks. Nick Jr. launched as a morning preschool block in 1988, and eventually spun-off into the Nick Jr. Channel in 2009. Nicktoons, based on Nickelodeon's flagship brand for original animated series, launched as a standalone channel in 2002. Noggin, an interactive educational brand created in partnership with Sesame Workshop, existed as a television channel from 1999 to 2009, and as a mobile streaming service from 2015 to 2024. Two blocks aimed at teenage audiences, Nickelodeon's TEENick and Noggin's The N, were merged to form the TeenNick channel in 2009.

It was brought under common ownership with long-time rival Cartoon Network following the 2026 acquisition of Warner Bros. Discovery by Paramount Skydance (now known as Skydance).

As of December 2023, Nickelodeon was available to approximately 70 million pay television households in the United States, down from its peak of 101 million households in 2011.

== History ==
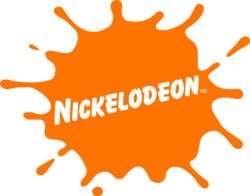
Nickelodeon "Splat" logo used from 2006 to 2009. The text in this logo has been in use from 1984 to 2009. This text is known as the typeface, Balloon.

The channel's name comes from the first five-cent movie theaters called nickelodeons. Its history dates back to December 1, 1977, when Warner Cable Communications (later known as Time Warner Cable) launched the first 2-way interactive cable system, QUBE, in Columbus, Ohio. The C-3 cable channel carried Pinwheel daily from 7:00 a.m. to 9:00 p.m. Eastern Time, and the channel was labelled "Pinwheel" on remote controllers, as it was the only program broadcast. Initially scheduled for a February 1979 launch, Nickelodeon launched on April 1, 1979, initially distributed to Warner Cable systems via satellite on the RCA Satcom-1 transponder. Originally commercial-free, advertising was introduced in January 1984.

== Programming ==
Programming seen on Nickelodeon includes animated series (such as SpongeBob SquarePants, The Loud House, The Patrick Star Show and The Smurfs), live-action, scripted series (such as The Thundermans: Undercover), and original television films, while the network's daytime schedule is dedicated to shows targeting preschoolers (Paw Patrol and Rubble & Crew).

Logo used since September 2009. Concurrently used with the 2023 logo since March 2023

A recurring program was bi-monthly special editions of Nick News, a news magazine series aimed at children hosted by Linda Ellerbee; it premiered in 1992 as a weekly series and ended in 2015. In June 2020, Nickelodeon announced that they would revive Nick News in a series of hour-long specials. The first installment, Kids, Race and Unity: A Nick News Special premiered on June 29, 2020, and was hosted by R&B musician Alicia Keys.

Since 2021, Nickelodeon has aired at least one live National Football League game a year, produced by corporate sibling CBS Sports and incorporating elements unique to Nickelodeon into the broadcast such as green slime in the end zone and SpongeBob SquarePants' face superimposed on the netting of the goalposts. Nickelodeon also carries the weekly shoulder program NFL Slimetime during the season which includes similar graphics. Nickelodeon offered the first alternate broadcast of a Super Bowl in 2024 when it aired a SpongeBob SquarePants-themed simulcast of CBS' coverage.

=== Nicktoons ===
Nicktoons is the branding for Nickelodeon's original animated series. Until 1991, the animated series that aired on Nickelodeon were largely imported from foreign countries, with some original animated specials that were also featured on the channel up to that point. Though the Nicktoons branding has infrequently been used by the network itself since the 2002 launch of the channel of the same name, original animated series continue to take a substantial portion of Nickelodeon's lineup. Roughly, six to seven hours of these programs are seen on the weekday schedule, and around nine hours on weekends, including a dedicated weekend morning animation block.

In 2006, the channel struck a deal with DreamWorks Animation to develop the studio's animated films into television series (such as The Penguins of Madagascar). Since the early 2010s, Nickelodeon Animation Studio has also produced series based on preexisting IP purchased by Paramount's predecessor, Viacom, such as Winx Club and Teenage Mutant Ninja Turtles.

=== Movies ===
Nickelodeon has produced a variety of original made-for-television movies, which usually premiere in weekend evening timeslots or on school holidays. Nickelodeon also periodically acquires theatrically released feature films for broadcast on the channel.

The channel occasionally airs feature films produced by the network's Nickelodeon Movies film production division (whose films are distributed by sister company Paramount Pictures). Although the film division has the Nickelodeon brand name, the channel does not have access to most of the movies produced by its film unit. The majority of the live-action feature films produced under the Nickelodeon Movies banner are licensed for broadcast by various free-to-air and pay television outlets within the United States other than Nickelodeon (although the network has aired a few live-action Nickelodeon Movies releases such as Angus, Thongs and Perfect Snogging and Good Burger).

Nickelodeon also advertises hour-long episodes of its original series as movies; though the "TV movie" versions of Nickelodeon's original series differ from traditional television films in that they have shorter running times (approximately 45 minutes, as opposed to 75–100 minute run times that most television movies have), and use a traditional multi-camera setup for regular episodes (unless the program is originally shot in the single-camera setup common of films) with some on-location filming.

In 2002, Nickelodeon entered a long-standing broadcast partnership with Mattel to air films and specials based on the latter's Barbie (and later Monster High) dolls. The first Barbie film to air on Nickelodeon was Barbie as Rapunzel on November 24, 2002. The Barbie and Monster High films are usually aired under a brokered format in which Mattel purchases the time in order to promote the release of their films on DVD within a few days of the Nickelodeon premiere, an arrangement possible as Nickelodeon does not have to meet the Federal Communications Commission rules which disallow that arrangement for broadcast channels due to regulations banning paid programming to children. This ended with Barbie: Video Game Hero in 2017, after which the Barbie film series moved to Netflix with a reduced 1-hour runtime.

=== Programming blocks ===
==== Current ====
- Nick Jr. – Nickelodeon currently broadcasts shows targeted at preschool-aged children on Monday through Fridays from 7 a.m. to 2 p.m. Eastern and Pacific Time (7:00 to 10:00 a.m. during the summer months, other designated school break periods, and on national holidays). The block primarily targets audiences of preschool age as Nickelodeon's usual audience of school-aged children are in school during the block's designated time period. Programs currently seen in this block include Paw Patrol, Peppa Pig, Blaze and the Monster Machines, Ryan's Mystery Playdate, Blue's Clues & You!, Santiago of the Seas, and Baby Shark's Big Show!.
- Nick at Nite – Nickelodeon's nighttime programming service, which premiered on July 1, 1985, and broadcasts from prime time to early morning (the block's air time varies each night). Originally featured classic sitcoms from the 1950s and 1960s such as The Donna Reed Show, Mr. Ed and Lassie, programming eventually shifted towards repeats of popular sitcoms from the 1980s to the 2000s such as Home Improvement, The Cosby Show and Roseanne. In 1996, a pay television channel, TV Land (formerly Nick at Nite's TV Land, until 1997) based on the block, launched with a similar format of programs. Nick at Nite has also occasionally incorporated original scripted and competition series, with some in recent years produced through its parent network's Nickelodeon Productions unit. As of 2021, programming on Nick at Nite consists entirely of acquired shows such as Full House, Friends, Mom and Young Sheldon. Since 2004, Nielsen has broken out the television ratings of Nick at Nite and Nickelodeon as two separate networks.

==== Former ====
- A&E – an eight-hour nighttime block that was launched on February 1, 1984 and dedicated to fine arts, documentaries, dramas, and other educational programming for older audiences. It was spun off the following year into a separate 24-hour cable network and replaced with Nick at Nite.
- SNICK – "SNICK" (short for "Saturday Night Nickelodeon") was the network's first dedicated Saturday primetime block that aired from 8:00 to 10:00 p.m. Eastern and Pacific Time featuring shows for preteens and teenagers, it premiered on August 15, 1992, with the initial lineup featuring two established series that originally aired on Sundays, Clarissa Explains It All and The Ren & Stimpy Show, and two new series, Roundhouse and Are You Afraid of the Dark?. The block mainly featured live-action series (primarily comedies), although it periodically featured animated series. SNICK was discontinued on January 29, 2005, and was replaced the following week by a Saturday night edition of the TEENick block on February 5, 2005.
- Nick in the Afternoon – "Nick in the Afternoon" was a daytime block that ran on weekday afternoons during the summer months from 1995 to 1997, and aired in an extended format until December for its final year in 1998. It was hosted by Stick Stickly, a Mr. Bill-like popsicle stick character (puppeteered by Rick Lyon and voiced by actor Paul Christie, who would later voice the Noggin mascot Moose A. Moose). The block was replaced for Summer 1999 by "Henry and June's Summer" (hosted by the animated hosts of the anthology series KaBlam!). From 2011 to 2012, Stick Stickly returned to television for TeenNick's "The '90s Are All That" to host "U-Pick with Stick" on Friday nights as a concept of user-chosen programming.
- U-Pick Live – "U-Pick Live" (originally branded as "U-Pick Friday" from 1999 to late 2000, and originally hosted by the Henry and June characters from KaBlam!) was a block that aired weekday afternoons from 5:00 to 7:00 p.m. Eastern and Pacific Time from October 14, 2002, to May 27, 2005, which was broadcast from studios in New York City's Times Square district, where Nickelodeon is headquartered. Using a similar concept that originated in 1994, with the Nick in the Afternoon block, "U-Pick Live" allowed viewer interaction in selecting the programs (usually cartoons) that would air on the block via voting on the network's website.
- TEENick – "TEENick" was a teenage-oriented block that ran from March 4, 2001, to February 1, 2009, which ran on Sundays from 6:00 to 9:00 p.m. Eastern and Pacific Time; a secondary block on Saturdays launched in 2005, replacing the 8:00 to 10:00 p.m. Eastern/Pacific timeslot long held by SNICK. It was originally hosted by Nick Cannon, and then by Jason "J. Boogie" Everhart. Beginning in January 2007, Noggin's own teenage-targeted block The N began airing programming from the block. The TEENick name, which was removed on February 1, 2009, later became the name of the channel TeenNick on September 28, 2009.
- ME:TV – "ME:TV" was a short-lived live hosted afternoon block that ran during summer 2007, which ran on weekday afternoons from 2:00 to 6:00 p.m. Eastern/Pacific Time.
- Nick Saturday Nights – a primetime live-action block airing from 8:00 to 9:30 p.m. Eastern and Pacific Time. It was introduced on September 22, 2012, as Gotta See Saturday Nights. Recent episodes of certain original series may air when no new episodes are scheduled to air that week. Premieres of the network's original made-for-television movies also occasionally aired during the primetime block, usually in the form of premiere showings. The block was discontinued in December 2021.
- Nick Studio 10 – "Nick Studio 10" was a short-lived late afternoon programming block that ran from February 18 to June 17, 2013, which ran weekdays from 4:00 to 6:00 p.m. Eastern and Pacific Time. The block featured wraparound segments based on episodes of the network's animated series, which were shown in an off-the-clock schedule due to the segments that aired following each program's individual acts.
- That New Thursday Night – a live-action comedy block airing from 7:00 to 8:00 p.m. Eastern and Pacific Time. The schedule featured Danger Force, Tyler Perry's Young Dylan, That Girl Lay Lay, The Really Loud House, and Erin & Aaron (all first-run episodes are cycled on the schedule, giving it a variable schedule). It was discontinued on June 29, 2023.
- AfterToons – an animation block airing weekday afternoons and featuring new episodes of a rotating selection of Nickelodeon animated series. The series featured are SpongeBob SquarePants, The Loud House, The Patrick Star Show, Big Nate, Rugrats, and The Smurfs. It was discontinued on November 24, 2023.

==== Special events ====
- Nickelodeon Kids' Choice Awards – The Kids' Choice Awards are a 90-minute-long annual live awards ceremony presented by the network. The award show (whose winners are selected by Nickelodeon viewers though voting on the channel's website and through text messaging) honors popular television series and movies, actors, athletes and music acts, with winners receiving a hollow orange blimp figurine (one of the logo outlines used for much of the network's "splat logo" era from 1984 to 2009).
- Nickelodeon Kids' Choice Sports – A spin-off of the Kids' Choice Awards, Kids Choice Sports was held in July with the same KCA voting procedures and differing categories for team sports and athlete achievements (featuring categories such as "Best Male Athlete", "Best Female Athlete", "King Of Swag", and "Queen Of Swag"), along with the award featuring a sports-specific purple mohawk. Its inaugural ceremony aired on July 17, 2014.
- Nickelodeon HALO Awards – The HALO Awards featured five ordinary teens who were Helping And Leading Others (HALO). Its inaugural ceremony aired on December 11, 2009. The awards show was hosted by Nick Cannon and aired on Nickelodeon and TeenNick every November/December until 2017.
- Worldwide Day of Play – The "Worldwide Day of Play" is an annual event held on a Saturday afternoon in late September that began on October 2, 2004, to mark the conclusion of the "Let's Just Play" campaign launched that year, which are both designed to influence children to exercise and participate in outdoor activities; schools and educational organizations are also encouraged to host local events to promote activity among children during the event. Nickelodeon and its sister channels (except for the Pacific and Mountain Time Zone feeds and the network's Pacific feed that is distributed to the Eastern and Central Time Zones), some of the network's international channels and associated websites are suspended (with a message encouraging viewers to participate in outdoor activities during the period) from 12:00 to 3:00 p.m. Eastern and Pacific Time on the day of the event. Since 2010, the Worldwide Day of Play event became part of The Big Help program, as part of an added focus on healthy lifestyles in addition to the program's main focus on environmental issues.

==== Blocks on broadcast networks ====
- Untitled UPN block – In 1998, Viacom's UPN entered into discussions with the network to produce a new block, but nothing ultimately materialized.
- Nickelodeon en Telemundo – On November 9, 1998, Telemundo introduced a daily block of Spanish dubs of Nickelodeon's series (such as Rugrats, Aaahh!!! Real Monsters, Hey Arnold!, Rocko's Modern Life, and Blue's Clues); the weekday edition of the block ran until September 5, 2000, when it was relegated to weekends in favor of the morning news program Hoy En El Mundo. Nickelodeon's contract with Telemundo ended in November 2001, after the network was acquired by NBC, though certain programs would return in 2004 as part of the Telemundo Kids block.

The former Nick on CBS logo used until its discontinuation in 2004

- Nick on CBS/Nick Jr. on CBS – On September 14, 2002, Nickelodeon began producing a two-hour Saturday morning block for CBS (which was co-owned with Nickelodeon at the time as a result of then-network parent Viacom's 1999 acquisition of CBS) to comply with the Children's Television Act. The block featured episodes of series such as As Told by Ginger, The Wild Thornberrys, Rugrats, Hey Arnold!, and Pelswick which premiered on most CBS stations. The block was retooled in 2004, as a preschool-oriented block featuring Nick Jr. shows (such as Blue's Clues, Dora the Explorer, and Little Bill); "Nick Jr. on CBS" was replaced in September 2006 by the KOL Secret Slumber Party block (produced by DIC Entertainment, which was subsequently acquired by Canada-based Cookie Jar (now WildBrain), as a result of CBS and Viacom's split into separate companies at the end of 2005, but remerged in late 2019.

== Related networks and services ==
=== Current sister channels ===
==== Nick Jr. Channel ====
Nick Jr. Channel (sometimes shortened to Nick Jr.) is a pay television network aimed mainly at children between 2 and 6 years of age. It features a mix of current and former preschool-oriented programs from Nickelodeon, as well as some shows that are exclusive to the channel. The Nick Jr. Channel launched on September 28, 2009, as a spin-off of Nickelodeon's preschool programming block of the same name, which had aired since January 4, 1988. The channel replaced Noggin, which was relaunched as a streaming service in 2015, and acts as a separate sister brand. Noggin's programming is distinct from the Nick Jr. channel's; it mainly carried preteen-oriented programs at its launch, and its 2015 streaming service features a variety of exclusive series. On October 1, 2012, the Nick Jr. Channel introduced NickMom, a four-hour nighttime block aimed at parents, which ran until September 28, 2015. While traditional advertising appeared on the channel during the NickMom block, the network otherwise only runs programming promotions and underwriter-style sponsorships in lieu of regular commercials.

==== Nicktoons ====
Nicktoons is a pay television network that launched on May 1, 2002, as Nicktoons TV; it was renamed Nicktoons in April 2003, and rebranded as Nicktoons Network in September 2005, before reverting to its previous name in September 2009. The network airs a mix of newer live-action and animated shows from Nickelodeon such as Henry Danger, The Fairly OddParents, The Loud House, SpongeBob SquarePants, and Teenage Mutant Ninja Turtles alongside original series airing exclusively on Nicktoons.

==== TeenNick ====
TeenNick is a pay television network that is aimed at adolescents and young adults, named after the TEENick block that aired on Nickelodeon from March 2001 to February 2009. The channel merged programming from the TEENick block with The N, a former block on Noggin. Although TeenNick has more relaxed program standards than the other Nickelodeon channels (save for Nick at Nite and the former NickMom block on Nick Jr.), allowing for moderate profanity, suggestive dialogue and some violent content, the network has shifted its lineup almost exclusively towards current and former Nickelodeon series (including some that are burned off due to low ratings on the flagship channel) that have stricter content standards. It also airs some acquired sitcoms and drama series.

==== NickMusic ====
NickMusic
- Country: United States
- Broadcast area: Nationwide

Programming
- Language: English
- Picture format: 480i 4:3 (SDTV) presented in 16:9 letterbox

Ownership
- Owner: Skydance Corporation
- Parent: Nickelodeon Group

History
- Launched: May 1, 2002; 24 years ago
- Former names: MTV Hits (2002–2016)

NickMusic is a pay television network in the United States featuring music videos from artists appealing to Nickelodeon's target audience. It launched on the channel space formerly held by MTV Hits on September 9, 2016.

Like its sibling music video-only networks BET Jams, BET Soul, and CMT Music, NickMusic is based on an automated "wheel" schedule that was introduced during the early years of MTV2. A new loop starts at 6 a.m. Eastern Time, and is then repeated at 2 p.m. and 10 p.m. Lyric videos are sometimes substituted due to content concerns with the artist's actual music video.

Final logo for MTV Hits from March 26, 2012, until September 9, 2016

The network launched on May 1, 2002, as MTV Hits, with its programming composed entirely of music videos. As with MTV Jams, the network was named for a daily program on MTV; in this case, MTV Hits, which was that network's main pop music video program. The network composed of current hit music videos, along with a few older videos from earlier in the year, as well as a few from the late 1990s. As both MTV Hits and NickMusic, the network has maintained a commercial-free format, other than internal promotions for Nickelodeon or MTV and MTV-branded properties.

The network has no individual or original programs; TeenNick Top 10, a program shared with TeenNick, was cancelled in mid-2018. In electronic program listings, the titles of each "block" merely delineate an hour in those listings and outside those titles denoting video theming, have no on-air mention. The network's specific theming to younger pop artists has also been underplayed as of 2024, due to various cuts at Paramount Global and the network's complete disassociation from further developing "triple threat" stars due to personnel and industry changes.

=== Former sister channels ===
- Nickelodeon Games and Sports for Kids (commonly branded as Nickelodeon GAS or Nick GAS), was a pay television network that launched on March 1, 1999, as part of the suite of high-tier channels launched by MTV Networks. It ran a mix of game shows and other competition programs from Nickelodeon (essentially formatted as a children's version of, and Viacom's answer to, the Game Show Network). The channel closed on December 31, 2007, and it was replaced by a short-lived 24-hour version of Noggin's teen-oriented block The N. However, an automated loop of Nick GAS continued to be carried on Dish Network due to unknown factors until April 23, 2009.
- NickMom (stylized as nickmom) was a programming block launched on October 1, 2012, airing in the late night hours on the Nick Jr. Channel. The block aired its own original programming aimed at parents until 2014, then began to carry acquired films and sitcoms. Due to Viacom's 2015 cutbacks involving acquired programming and low ratings, the NickMom block and associated website were discontinued in the early morning hours of September 28, 2015.

- Nick 2 was the off-air brand for a secondary timeshift channel of Nickelodeon formerly available on the high-tier packages exclusively on cable providers as a complement to the main Nickelodeon feed, repackaging Nickelodeon's Eastern and Pacific Time Zone feeds for the appropriate time zone (the Pacific feed was distributed to the Eastern and Central Time Zones, and the Eastern feed was distributed to the Pacific and Mountain Time Zones) resulting in the difference in local airtimes for a particular program between two geographic locations being three hours at most, allowing viewers a second chance to watch a program after its initial airing on the Eastern Time Zone feed or to watch the show ahead of its airing on the Pacific Time Zone feed of the main channel (for example, the Nick at Nite block would respectively start at 9:00 p.m (Sundays-Fridays) and at 10:30 p.m (Saturdays) Eastern on Nick 2 Pacific or 12:00 p.m. (weekdays) 10:00 a.m (weekends) Pacific weeknights on Nick 2 Eastern). Nick 2 would never broadcast in high definition, but the exception is through Xfinity's IPTV services. The service existed from around 2000 until November 2018, launching as Nick TOO. The timeshift channel was originally offered as part of the MTV Networks Digital Suite, a slate of channels exclusive to high-tier cable packages (many of the networks also received satellite carriage over time), and was the only American example of two feeds of a non-premium service being provided to cable and IPTV providers. A Nick TOO logo was used on the channel until 2004, when MTV Networks discontinued using a customized branding on the feed (a logo for Nick 2 was only used for identification purposes on electronic program guides as a placeholder image); most television listings thus showed the additional channel under the brandings "Nick Pacific (NICKP)/Nick West (NICKW)," or "Nick East (NICKE)." DirecTV and Dish Network also offer both Nickelodeon feeds, though they carry both time zone feeds of most of the children's networks that the providers offer by default. Viacom Media Networks discontinued the Nick 2 digital cable service on November 22, 2018, likely due to video on demand options making timeshift channels for the most part superfluous. Both time zone feeds continue to be offered on Xfinity as well as satellite providers, unbranded.
- NickRewind (TeenNick block) On July 25, 2011, TeenNick began airing The '90s Are All That, renamed The Splat in October 2015, a block of Nickelodeon's most popular 1990s programming, targeting the network's target demographic from that era. After several name changes, the block's final name was "NickRewind" and focused on programming from the 1980s, 1990s, and 2000s (mainly the latter two), and aired nightly. On January 31, 2022, the block was discontinued, with TeenNick's overnight programming mainly consisting of regular reruns.

=== Other services ===
Service	Description
Nickelodeon HD	Nickelodeon HD (known on-air from 2009 to 2015 as Nick HD) is the high-definition simulcast feed of Nickelodeon that broadcasts in the 1080i resolution format; the feed launched on November 14, 2007, and first began broadcasting content in high-definition on March 9, 2008. Most of the network's original series since 2008, mainly its live-action series and some animated content, as well as episodes of programs carried by Nick at Nite (that were either natively produced in HD after 2000 or were remastered in high definition) are broadcast in HD, along with feature films, Nickelodeon original movies made after 2005 and select episodes, films and series produced before 2008. Other programs unavailable in HD broadcast in pillarboxed 4:3 standard definition. The network's HD content airs with letterboxing on the standard definition channel, and since 2018, many subscription providers carry the high-definition feed and downscale it for the standard-definition feed, broadcasting in 16:9 letterboxed to fit the 4:3 ratio.
Nick on Demand	Nick on Demand is the network's video-on-demand service, which is available on most subscription providers. It carries Nickelodeon's live-action, animated and preschool programming. Nick at Nite has no on-demand service due to daypart-defined contractual limits for its programming, as its programs are exclusive to an evening timeslot.
Noggin	Noggin launched as a television channel in a partnership with Sesame Workshop on February 2, 1999. The channel ran until 2009, and an educational streaming service and app aimed at preschoolers launched on March 5, 2015. The app then shut down on July 2, 2024, due to layoffs, and was revived on August 21, 2025, with a new app and a new logo. The revival is targeted at pre-teens instead of preschoolers.
Nick Pluto TV	Launched on May 1, 2019, Nick Pluto is one of several free versions of Paramount channels that were introduced on Pluto TV shortly after Viacom acquired the advertiser-supported service in January 2019. It carries mostly archival programs from Nickelodeon's library. Nick Jr. programming is its separate channel, while Nick at Nite programming is instead put under the TV Land branding, and only includes syndicated programming Paramount Skydance has full day rights to. Pluto TV also carries additional Nickelodeon-branded networks, among them included NickGames (containing the network's game show and reality competition library), and NickMovies (featuring movies produced by Nickelodeon), along with single full-time channels carrying one series and limited-run channels timed to an event or holiday.
Paramount+	The streaming service of Paramount Skydance, Paramount+ offers much of Nickelodeon's library, adding productions from the "classic" era such as You Can't Do That on Television and Double Dare following its rebrand from CBS All Access in 2021.

=== Production studios ===
==== Nickelodeon Animation Studio ====
Nickelodeon Animation Studio (formerly Games Animation, Inc.) is a production firm with two main locations (one in Burbank, California, and the other in New York City). They serve as the animation facilities for many of the network's Nicktoons and Nick Jr. series.

==== Nickelodeon Productions ====
Nickelodeon Productions is a production studio in New York, that provides original sitcoms, animated shows and game-related programs for Nickelodeon. It was founded as Games Productions in 1987, after MTV Networks was purchased by Viacom. The studio was made an in-name only unit of Paramount Television Studios in October 2025; the studio's logo is still seen at the end of animated television shows.

==== Nickelodeon on Sunset ====
Nickelodeon on Sunset was a studio complex in Hollywood, California which served as the primary production facility for Nickelodeon's series from 1997 until 2017; the studio is designated by the National Register for Historic Places as a historical landmark as a result of its prior existence as the Earl Carroll Theater, a prominent dinner theater. It served as the production facilities for several Nickelodeon series.

== Media ==
=== Nickelodeon Games ===
Nickelodeon Games is the video game licensing arm of Nickelodeon. They started a long-standing relationship with game publisher THQ. THQ's relationship with the network started off when THQ published their Ren & Stimpy game for Nintendo consoles in 1992, followed by a full-fledged console deal in 1997 with several Rugrats titles, was successful in 2000 to secure console game rights to SpongeBob SquarePants and Rocket Power, and expanded in 2001, when THQ acquired some of the assets from Mattel Interactive, namely the computer publishing rights, and all video game rights to The Wild Thornberrys. Nickelodeon also worked, alongside THQ on an original game concept, Tak and the Power of Juju.

In addition to THQ, Nickelodeon also signed a deal with Sega of America for its line of video games based on The Ren & Stimpy Show for Sega consoles. In 1998, Nickelodeon signed a deal with Broderbund to produce computer video games based on its properties. Broderbund was later sold to Mattel, and Mattel Interactive released The Wild Thornberrys video games before Mattel shuttered and sold its game rights to THQ.

=== Nick.com ===
Nick.com is Nickelodeon's main website, which launched in October 1995 as a component of America Online's Kids Only channel before eventually moving to the full World Wide Web. It provides content, as well as video clips and full episodes of Nickelodeon series available for streaming. The website's popularity grew to the point where in March 1999, Nick.com became the highest rated website among children aged 6–14 years old. Nickelodeon used the website in conjunction with television programs which increased traffic. In 2001, Nickelodeon partnered with Networks Inc. to provide broadband video games for rent from Nick.com; the move was a further step in the multimedia direction that the developers wanted to take the website. Skagerlind indicated that over 50% of Nick.com's audience were using a high speed connection, which allowed them to expand the gaming and video streaming options on the website.

=== Mobile apps ===
Nickelodeon released a free mobile app for smartphones and tablet computers operating on the Apple and Android platforms in February 2013. Like Nick.com, a TV Everywhere login code provided by participating subscription providers was required to view individual episodes of the network's series. In December 2023, Paramount Global announced that the app and all other Paramount owned apps would be discontinued on January 31, 2024.

=== Nickelodeon Movies ===
Nickelodeon Movies is a motion picture production arm that was founded in 1995. The first film released from the studio was the 1996 mystery/comedy Harriet the Spy. Nickelodeon Movies has produced films based on Nickelodeon animated programs including The Rugrats Movie and The SpongeBob SquarePants Movie, as well as other adaptations and original live-action and animated projects.

=== Nickelodeon Magazine ===
Nickelodeon Magazine was a print magazine that was launched in 1993; the channel had previously published a short-lived magazine effort in 1990. Nickelodeon Magazine incorporated informative non-fiction pieces, humor (including pranks and parodical pieces), interviews, recipes (such as green slime cake), and a comic book section in the center of each issue featuring original comics by leading underground cartoonists as well as strips about popular Nicktoons. It ended in December 2009, after 16 years, citing a sluggish magazine industry. A new version of the magazine was published by Papercutz from June 2015 to mid-2016.

=== Nick Radio ===
Nick Radio was a radio network that launched on September 30, 2013, in a partnership between both the network and IHeartMedia (then called Clear Channel Communications), which distributed the network mainly via its iHeartRadio web platform and mobile app. The station was also streamed via the Nick.com website and WHTZ's second HD Radio subchannel in the New York area. Nick Radio focused on Top 40 and pop music aimed at the network's target audience of children (with radio edits of some songs incorporated due to inappropriate content), along with celebrity interview features. In addition to regular on-air DJs, Nick Radio also occasionally featured guest DJ stints by popular artists as well as stars from Nickelodeon's original series.

Nick Radio shut down without warning on July 31, 2019, and was replaced by Hit Nation Junior, likely due to the network's general failure to establish any sustained "triple threat" artists/actors throughout the 2010s, along with the general failure of the children's-only radio format in the streaming age.

== Themed experiences and hotels ==
=== Nickelodeon Universe ===
Nickelodeon Universe at the Mall of America is the first indoor Nickelodeon theme park in the United States. Before being re-themed to Nickelodeon in 2007, the park was themed as "Camp Snoopy" and "The Park at MoA." The theme park contains a variety of Nickelodeon-themed rides, including: SpongeBob SquarePants: Rock Bottom Plunge, Fairly Odd Coaster, and Teenage Mutant Ninja Turtles: Shell Shock.

Nickelodeon and Triple Five Group opened a second Nickelodeon Universe theme park in the American Dream Meadowlands complex on October 25, 2019. Upon opening, it became the largest indoor theme park in the western hemisphere, defeating the Mall of America's Nickelodeon Universe which had the title from 2008 to 2019.

On August 18, 2009, Nickelodeon and Southern Star Amusements announced that it would build a Nickelodeon Universe in New Orleans, Louisiana, on the site of the former Six Flags New Orleans by the end of 2010, which was set to be the first outdoor Nickelodeon Universe theme park. On November 9, 2009, Nickelodeon announced that it had ended the licensing agreement with Southern Star Amusements.

=== Theme park areas ===
Current attractions

- Nickland is an area inside of Movie Park Germany featuring Nickelodeon-themed rides, including a SpongeBob SquarePants-themed "Splash Battle" ride, and a Jimmy Neutron-themed roller coaster.
- Nickelodeon Land opened on May 4, 2011, at Blackpool Pleasure Beach, featuring several rides based on Nickelodeon series including SpongeBob SquarePants, Avatar: The Last Airbender, Dora the Explorer, and The Fairly OddParents.
- Nickelodeon Land opened in September 2015 at Sea World, featuring multiple rides based on Nickelodeon programs including a SpongeBob junior roller coaster, and a Teenage Mutant Ninja Turtles-themed flyer.
- Nickelodeon Land is also an area within Parque de Atracciones de Madrid. Opened in 2014, this area contains rides and attractions based on Jimmy Neutron, SpongeBob SquarePants, Paw Patrol, and other Nickelodeon franchises.
- Nickelodeon Playtime/Nickelodeon Adventure are two themed children's entertainment centers in Essex, England and Shenzhen, China. Play areas and attractions in these centers are immersively themed to SpongeBob SquarePants, Paw Patrol, and additional Nickelodeon shows.

Closed areas

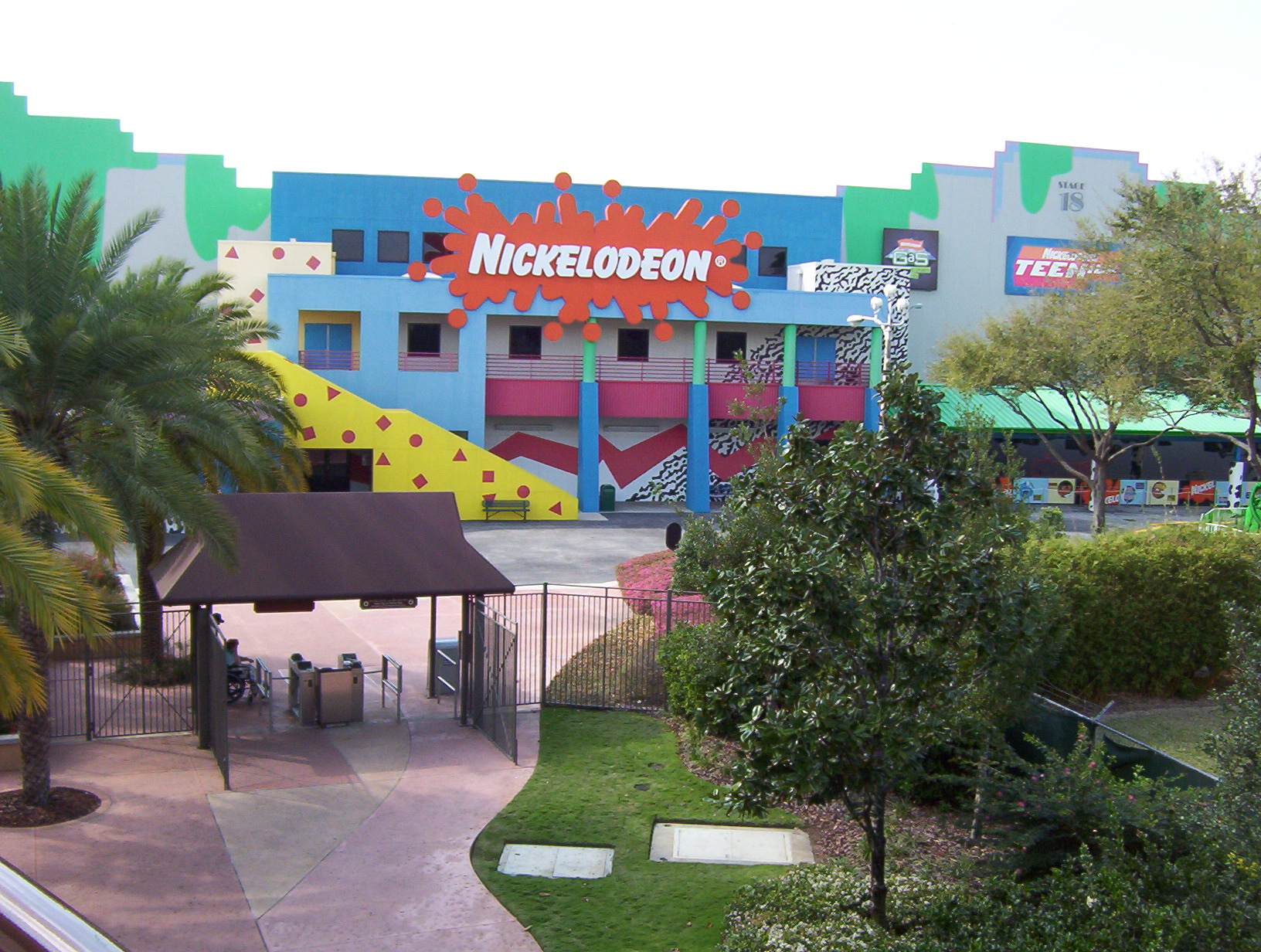
Nickelodeon Studios as viewed from the Hard Rock Cafe in March 2004 before it closed

- Nickelodeon Universe was also an area inside of Paramount's Kings Island featuring Nickelodeon-themed rides and attractions. It was one of the largest sections in the park and was voted "Best Kid's Area" by Amusement Today magazine from 2001 until its closure in 2009, after the park's sale to Cedar Fair (the Paramount Parks ended up with CBS Corporation in the 2006 CBS/Viacom split, which CBS immediately sold off as soon as possible as non-critical surplus assets for that company).
- Nickelodeon Studios was an attraction at the Universal Orlando Resort that opened on June 7, 1990, and housed production for many Nickelodeon programs (including Clarissa Explains It All, What Would You Do? and All That). It closed on April 30, 2005, after Nickelodeon's production facilities were moved to New York City and Burbank, California. The building that formerly housed it was recently occupied by the Blue Man Group Sharp Aquos Theatre, closed in February 2021. Another Nickelodeon-themed attraction at the park, Jimmy Neutron's Nicktoon Blast, opened in 2003 but closed in 2011, in favor of another ride, Despicable Me Minion Mayhem. In 2012, a store based on SpongeBob SquarePants opened in Woody Woodpecker's Kidzone, replacing Universal's Cartoon Store.
- Nickelodeon Central was an area inside of the Paramount Parks properties, including California's Great America, Carowinds, Kings Dominion, Canada's Wonderland, and Dreamworld that featured shows, attractions and themes featuring Nickelodeon characters, all of which began to be discontinued when CBS Corporation was given ownership of the theme parks in the Viacom/CBS split and eventually sold most of the properties to Cedar Fair without renewal of the Nickelodeon licensing agreements. The only Nickelodeon Central remaining in existence was at Dreamworld in Australia, which is not under Cedar Fair ownership. The license was revoked in 2011 and became "Kid's World", later DreamWorks Experience, and currently Kenny and Belinda's Dreamland.
- Nickelodeon Blast Zone was an area in Universal Studios Hollywood that featured several attractions inspired by Nickelodeon shows. The four attractions that were present in the area were "Nickelodeon Splash", a waterpark-style area, "The Wild Thornberrys Adventure Temple", a jungle-themed foam ball play area, and "Nick Jr. Backyard", a medium-sized toddler playground. It ran from 2001 to 2007 and was rethemed as "The Adventures of Curious George" which closed in 2008 to make way for The Wizarding World of Harry Potter. Adjacent to Nickelodeon Blast Zone was the "Panasonic Theatre" which housed Totally Nickelodeon, an audience-participated game show which ran from 1997 to 2000. "Rugrats Magic Adventure" replaced the game show in 2001, but closed in 2002 to make way for Shrek 4-D which ran from May 2003 to August 2017. It closed to make way for DreamWorks Theatre featuring Kung Fu Panda which opened on June 15, 2018.
- Nickelodeon Splat City was an area inside California's Great America (from 1995 to 2002), Kings Island (from 1995 to 2000) and Kings Dominion (from 1995 to 1999), that featured slime and water-themed attractions. The slime refinery theme was carried out in the attractions such as the "Green Slime Zone Refinery", the "Crystal Slime Mining Maze", and the "Green Slime Transfer Truck". All of these areas were later transformed into either Nickelodeon Central or Nickelodeon Universe before being discontinued as mentioned above when sold off by CBS Corporation.

=== Hotel brands ===
- Nickelodeon Suites Resort was a Nickelodeon-themed hotel in Orlando, Florida, located near the Universal Orlando Resort and 1-mile (1.6 km) from Walt Disney World. The hotel originally opened in 1999, and re-opened under its Nickelodeon re-theming in 2005. It included one-to-three bedroom themed child suites, a water park area, arcade, and various forms of entertainment themed after Nickelodeon shows. It also contained a Nick at Nite-themed lounge area for adults. The property was re-themed to "Holiday Inn Resort Orlando Suites" on June 1, 2016.
- Nickelodeon Resorts by Marriott was a proposed hotel chain similar to the Nickelodeon Suites Resort, featuring a 110,000-square-foot (10,000 m^{2}) waterpark area and 650 hotel rooms. Announced in 2007, the first location was scheduled to open in San Diego in 2010, however, the plans were canceled in 2009. Plans for the remaining 19 hotels originally slated to open remain unclear.
- Nickelodeon Hotels and Resorts is a hotel chain that opened its first location in Punta Cana, Dominican Republic in 2016, in association with Karisma Hotels and Resorts. The second location opened in Riviera Maya, Mexico in 2021. A third property connected to The Land of Legends theme park in Antalya, Turkey opened in 2025. A fourth location is in development for Everest Place in Orlando, Florida for a 2028 opening, and a fifth location is currently in development for a 2029 opening in Garden Grove, California.

=== Cruises ===
- Nickelodeon at Sea was a series of Nickelodeon-themed cruise packages in partnership with Norwegian Cruise Line. They feature special amenities and entertainment themed to various Nickelodeon properties. This was later removed in 2015.
- Norwegian Cruise Line also hosted some Nickelodeon Cruises on the Norwegian Jewel and Norwegian Epic liners, as part of Nickelodeon at Sea.

== International ==
Between 1993 and 1995, Nickelodeon opened international channels in the United Kingdom, Australia, and Germany; by the later year, the network had provided its programming to broadcasters in 70 countries. Since the mid-1990s, Nickelodeon as a brand has expanded into include language- or culture-specific channels for various other territories in different parts of the world including Europe, Asia, Oceania, and Canada, and has licensed some of its cartoons and other content, in English and local languages, to free-to-air networks and subscription channels such as KI.KA and Super RTL in Germany, RTÉ Two (English language) and TG4 (Irish language) in Ireland, YTV (in English, until 2025) and Vrak.TV (in French, now defunct) in Canada, Canal J, TF1, Teletoon and later, Gulli in France, Alpha Kids in Greece, CNBC-e in Turkey, and Network 10's localized version of Nickelodeon in Australia.

== See also ==
- List of Nickelodeon novelizations
- Nicktoons

== Bibliography ==
- Hendershot, Heather, ed. (2004). Nickelodeon Nation: The History, Politics, and Economics of America's Only TV Channel for Kids. New York: New York University Press. ISBN 0-8147-3652-1.
- Klickstein, Mathew (2013). SLIMED! An Oral History of Nickelodeon's Golden Age. New York: Plume. ISBN 978-0-14-219685-4.
