= The Land of Legends =

Amusement park in Antalya, Turkey

The Land Of Legends
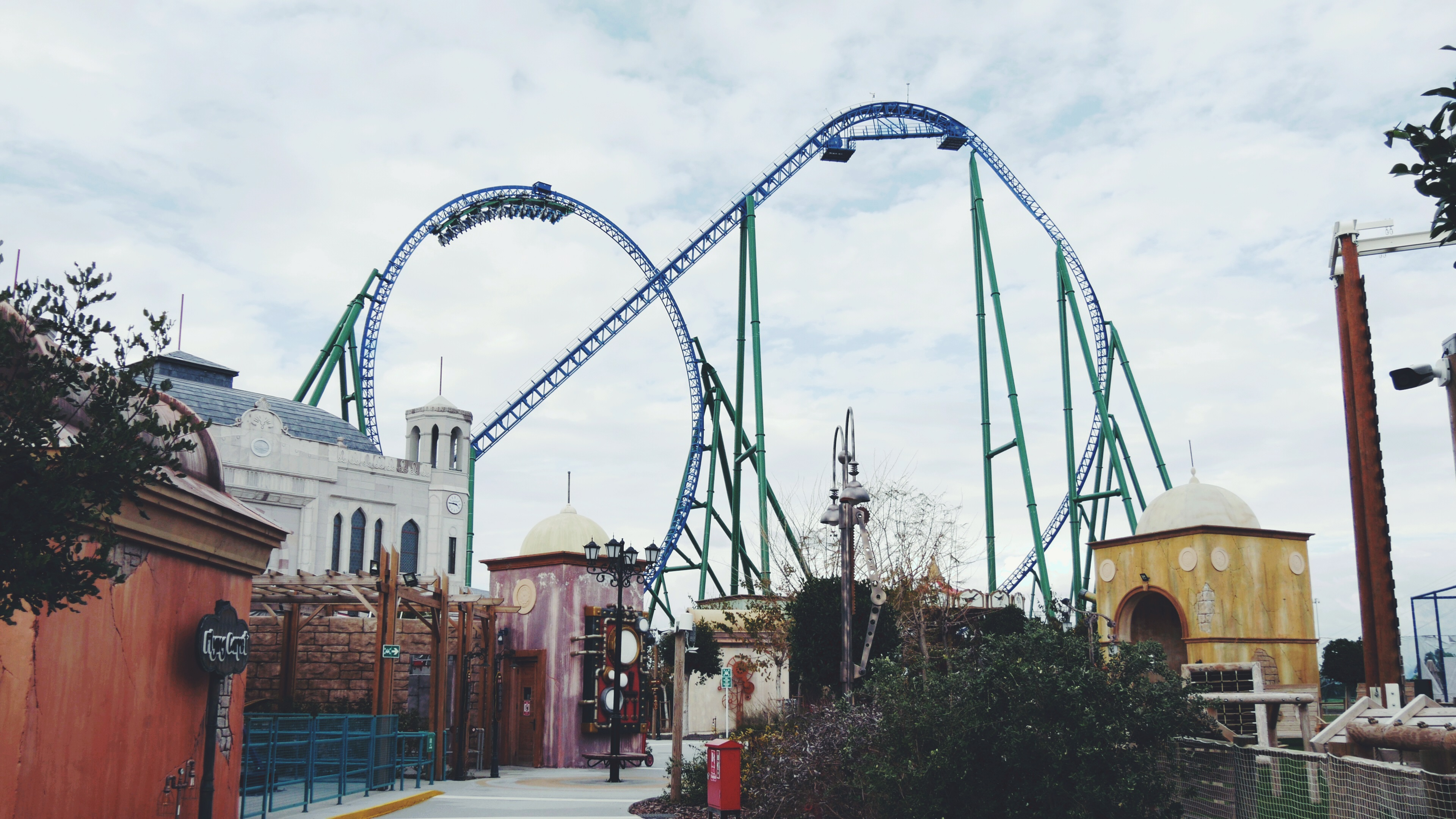
- Interactive map of The Land Of Legends
- Location: Antalya, Turkey
- Coordinates: 36°52′37″N 31°00′10″E
- Status: Operating
- Opened: 2016
- Owner: Rixos Hotels

The Land of Legends is an amusement park and water park in Antalya, Turkey. It contains a shopping mall and a hotel within the park. It is the largest theme park in Turkey. There are three sections of the park which are "Adventure Land," "Masha and the Bear Land of Laughter," and "Nickelodeon Land."

== History ==
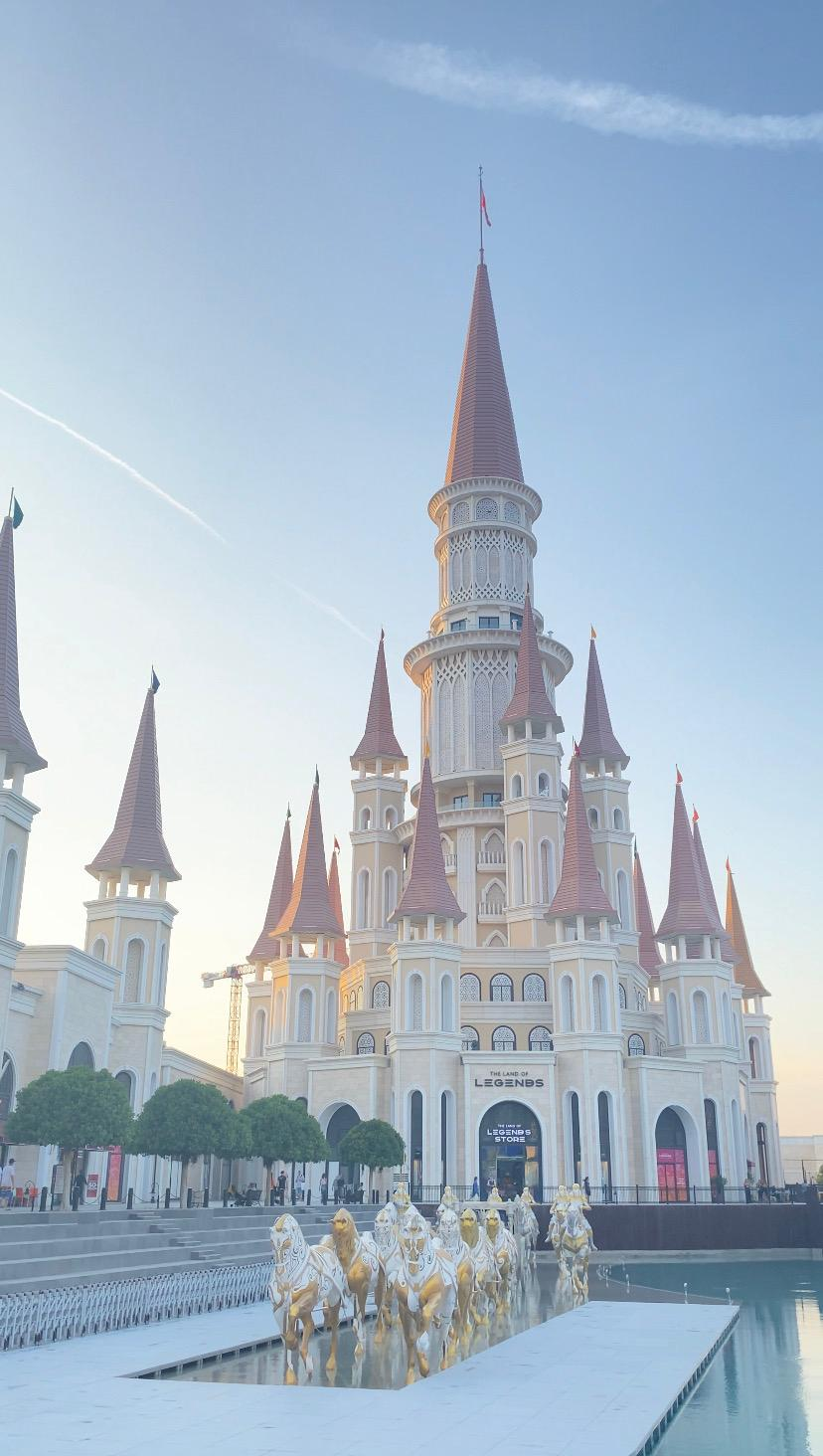

Rixos World Parks & Entertainment founded the park and opened in 2016, which eventually they incorporated a shopping mall and the Kingdom Hotel for expansions. Later a 111 feet tower was added. Fettah Tahmince, the chairman of Rixos said, "The Land of Legends is the first ring of the new generation entertainment destinations that we will revive. With this project, we create a new destination beyond a hotel, a theme park, shopping units and aqua parks" and Adventure Rapids was the first rollercoaster added to the park. There is also a spa, and other entertainment, within the park. A wave pool was later added and a five-star hotel with accommodations.

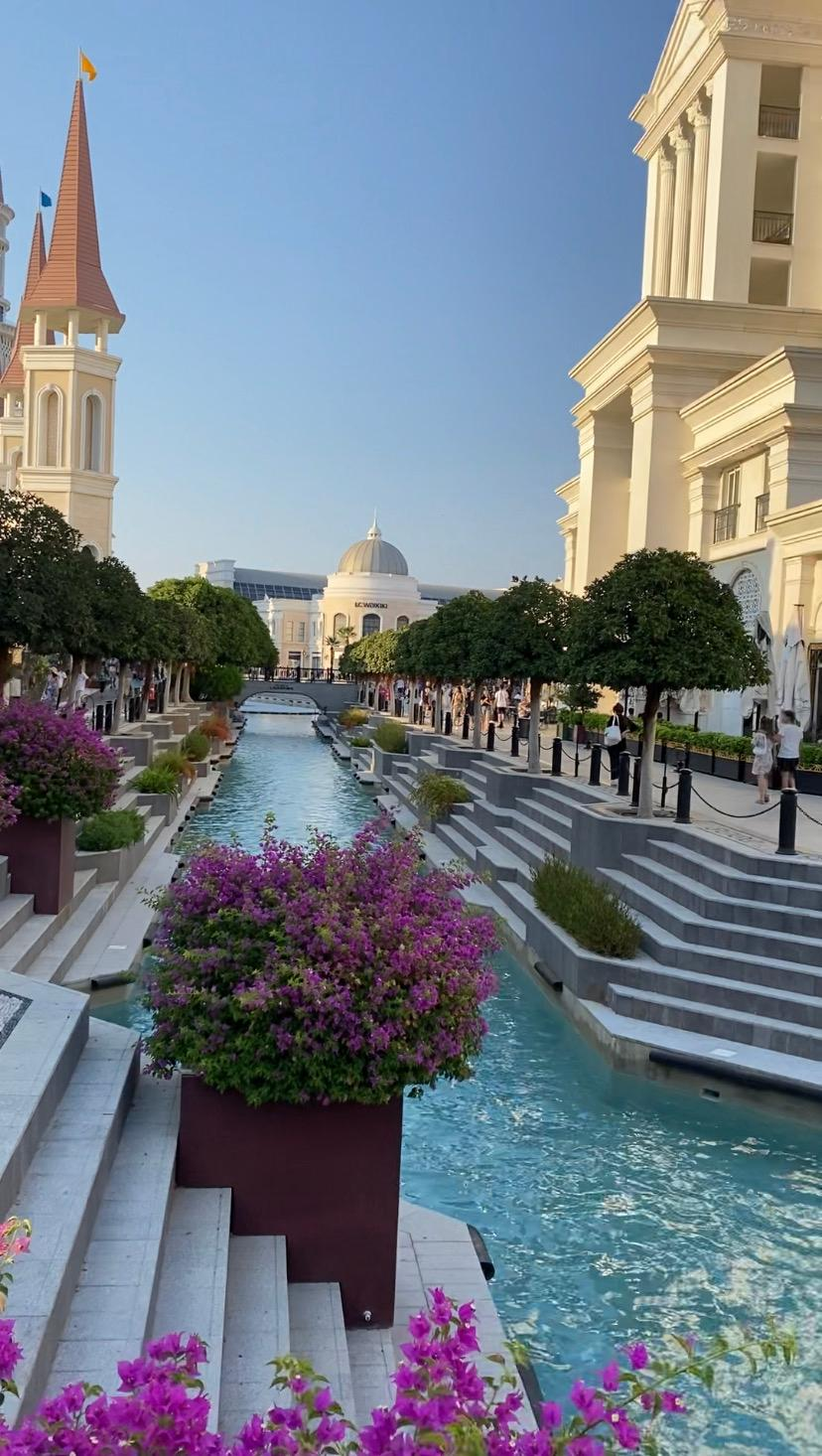
View of canal

In 2017, it was awarded "Europe's Best Theme Park" in the World Travel Awards and for its waterpark in the Leading Edge Awards and the park reaches 620 kilometers (385 miles). It won the award again in 2018.

On March 1, 2025, the park opened an expansion that includes a Nickelodeon themed hotel and a "Nickelodeon Land" area, themed to SpongeBob SquarePants, Paw Patrol, and Star Trek: Prodigy. The indoor SpongeBob SquarePants section includes an installation of SpongeBob's Crazy Carnival Ride from Sally Dark Rides, making it the first SpongeBob dark ride to open outside of the United States.

== Awards ==
- World Travel Awards - Avrupa’nın En İyi Tema Parkı (2017)
- World Waterpark Association – Leading Edge (2017)
- Hermes Creative Awards (2018)
- European Star Award 2018, Europe's Best New Coasters (2018)
- European Star Award 2018, Europe's Best Water Parks (2018)
- World Travel Awards, World's Leading Luxury Themed Resort 2019, 94 (2019)
- Shining Star Awards, Istanbul Attraction Awards, Eğlence, Etkinlik ve Rekreasyon Ödülleri (2019)
- European Star Award 2019, Europe's Best Water Parks (2019)
- European Star Award 2019, Europe's Best Thrill Water Slides (2019)
- European Star Award 2019, Europe's Best Family Water Slides (2019)
- European Star Award 2019, Europe's Best Water Rides (2019)
- European Star Award 2020, Europe's Best Water Parks (2020)
- European Star Award 2020, Europe's Best Water Rides (2020)
- European Star Award 2021, Europe's Best Water Parks (2021)
- European Star Award 2021, Europe's Best Water Rides (2021)
- European Star Award 2021, Europe's Best Water Slides (2021)
- Europe's Leading Entertainment & Dining Resort 2021 (2021)
- Europe's Leading Theme Park Hotel 2021 (2021)
