= Holiday Inn Resort Orlando Suites – Waterpark =

Hotel in Orlando, Florida, United States

Coordinates: 28°21′24″N 81°30′40″W

Holiday Inn Resort Orlando Suites - Waterpark by IHG
- The Holiday Inn Resort Orlando Suites logo, used since 2016

- The final logo for the Nickelodeon Suites Resort, used from 2010 to 2016

General information
- Location: 18000 International Drive S Orlando, Florida
- Opening: July 7, 1999 (as Holiday Inn Family Suites); March 9, 2005 (as Nickelodeon Family Suites by Holiday Inn, later Nickelodeon Suites Resort); June 1, 2016 (as Holiday Inn Resort Orlando Suites – Waterpark)
- Owner: Urban Commons (UCCONT1 LLC.)

Technical details
- Floor count: 6

Design and construction
- Developer: Miller Global Properties

Other information
- Number of suites: 777

Website
- www.hisuitesorlando.com

Holiday Inn Resort Orlando Suites - Waterpark by IHG (formerly known as Holiday Inn Family Suites, Nickelodeon Family Suites by Holiday Inn, Nickelodeon Suites Resort, and simply the Nick Hotel) is an all-suite hotel in Orlando, Florida, United States, near the Universal Orlando Resort and one mile from Walt Disney World Resort. It is a Holiday Inn Resort. From 2005 to 2016, the hotel was themed after the cable television channel Nickelodeon.

The resort features one-to-three bedroom suites and two waterparks, the Lagoon Pool and Oasis Pool. A "4-D" film theater using SimEx-Iwerks technology, 3,000-square-foot arcade, golf course, multi-level basketball court and family game shows are held at the hotel, and "Nick After Dark" event locations were also previously held at the hotel. The resort formerly contained a shopping area with a Nickelodeon-brand retail shop and a buffet known as the "Nicktoons Café", among other restaurants. Near the entrance of the resort was a time capsule formerly buried outside the former Nickelodeon Studios complex at nearby Universal Studios Florida.

Nickelodeon Suites Resort was named one of the AAA's top ten family vacation spots in 2010, and in 2011, the hotel became the first to receive the AHLEI's Certified Guest Service Property Designation.

On January 18, 2021, the debranded Holiday Inn Resort filed for Chapter 11 bankruptcy.

== History ==
The original hotel opened on July 7, 1999, and was branded the "Holiday Inn Family Suites". At an October 9, 2003 press conference in New York City, Holiday Inn and Nickelodeon announced a partnership and renovation of the hotel, which would transform it into the Nickelodeon Family Suites by Holiday Inn. The announcement followed a two-year deal in which Holiday Inn promoted SpongeBob SquarePants at its locations.

Before licensing the Nickelodeon name to Holiday Inn, Nickelodeon had considered opening a hotel on its own. Nickelodeon decided against it, since they had observed recent troubles with their competitors opening themed locations (such as Club Disney). The company opted instead to give Holiday Inn the permission to use the Nickelodeon name and characters. Nickelodeon and Holiday Inn had further "hopes to add at least four more Nickelodeon-branded hotels in other tourist areas during the next few years," but they did not materialize.

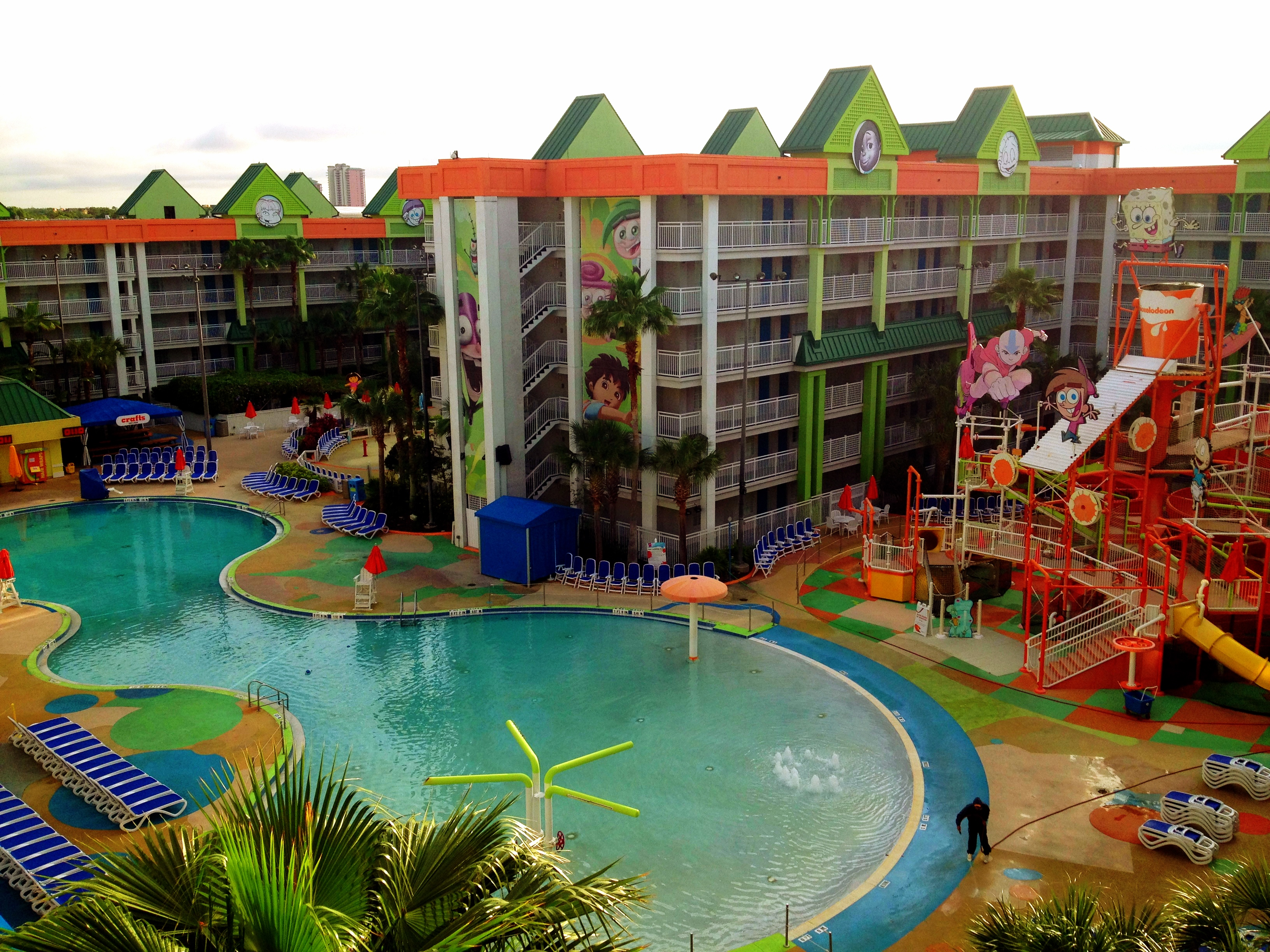
The then Nickelodeon Suites Resort in April 2013

In 2005, the hotel's $25 million renovation ended with a Memorial Day event to promote the hotel's reopening. At this time, the resort began hosting two nightly game shows, titled Nick Live and Who Knows Best (a Double Dare-themed game show was added in May 2012).

In November 2007, the resort hosted "Noggin Month", a month of events themed around shows on Nickelodeon's sister channel, Noggin. Donovan Patton (better known as Joe, the second star and live-action host of Blue's Clues) made special appearances, and hotel guests were given plastic puppet eyes from the Noggin show Oobi.

Nickelodeon Suites Resort started offering customizable wedding packages in 2009. In 2012, the resort promoted Hotel Transylvania with walk-around characters and dance parties themed to the film. In 2014, the hotel promoted the premiere of Dora and Friends: Into the City! with a preschool-themed event featuring costume characters from Bubble Guppies, Dora the Explorer, Little Bill, The Backyardigans, Wonder Pets!, and Team Umizoomi. Also in 2014, the resort launched a laser maze area themed to Teenage Mutant Ninja Turtles.

In 2015, marked the resort's tenth year under its Nickelodeon name and the hotel hosted weekly celebratory events from March 6 until November of that year.

=== Rebranding ===
On January 29, 2016, less than a year after celebrating its tenth anniversary, Nick Hotel posted an official statement on their website stating that starting on April 18, 2016, the hotel would be rebranded back into a Holiday Inn. Nickelodeon experiences were set to be discontinued after April 30, 2016, but were extended until May 31, 2016, after the rebrand was pushed back to June 1, 2016. Before the resort closed, the time capsule held at the resort was moved to Nickelodeon Animation Studio in Burbank, California.

After the debranding, the hotel continued to struggle. With the COVID-19 pandemic in 2020 affecting tourism in the area, the hotel lost 300 jobs in April 2020. The hotel filed for Chapter 11 bankruptcy on January 18, 2021.

=== Legacy ===
YouTube channel Defunctland released a 20-minute documentary covering the rise and fall of the Nickelodeon Hotel in July 2018. The documentary amassed millions of views, making it one of the channel's most viewed videos.

== See also ==
- Cartoon Network Hotel
