= List of largest shopping malls in the United States =

This is a list of shopping malls in the United States and its territories that have at least 2,000,000 total square feet (190,000 m^{2}) of retail space (gross leasable area). The list is based on the latest self-reported figures from the mall management websites, which are also reported on each mall's individual wiki page.

#	Mall name	Location	Metro area	Total space Sq. feet/(m^{2})	Stores	Anchor stores/entertainment venues	Year opened	Ownership
1	Mall of America	Bloomington, Minnesota	Minneapolis-Saint Paul	5,689,000 square feet (528,500 m^{2})	520+	Macy's, Nordstrom, Nickelodeon Universe, Nickelodeon Store, Apple Store, Barnes & Noble Booksellers, Build-A-Bear Workshop, Five Below, GameStop, Lego Store, M&M's Store, Rainforest Cafe, Sea Life Minnesota Aquarium, Toys "R" Us	1992	Triple Five Group
2	American Dream	East Rutherford, New Jersey	Newark	3,000,000 square feet (280,000 m^{2})	450+	Nickelodeon Universe, DreamWorks Water Park, Big SNOW American Dream, Legoland Discovery Center, Apple Store, Sea Life, Primark, Zara, Hermès, B&B Theatres (coming soon), H Mart, IT'SUGAR, Best Buy, Old Navy, Toys R Us	2019	Triple Five Group
3	The Galleria	Houston, Texas	Houston	3,000,000 square feet (280,000 m^{2})	400	Nordstrom, Macy's, Neiman Marcus, Saks Fifth Avenue, Kay Jewelers, Claire's, Kate Spade New York, Apple Store, Lego Store, Lids	1970	Simon Property Group (50.4%), Walton Street Real Estate Funds, Sony Corporation & CalPERS
4	King of Prussia Mall	King of Prussia, Pennsylvania	Philadelphia	2,793,200 square feet (259,500 m^{2})	450	Macy's, Nordstrom, Primark, Dick's Sporting Goods, Bloomingdale's, Neiman Marcus, Eataly, Old Navy, Levi's, DSW Designer Shoe Warehouse, Urban Outfitters, Gucci, Louis Vuitton, Cartier, Hermes, Tiffany & Co., Victoria's Secret, Swatch, Apple Store, RH, Lego Store, Banana Republic, Talbots, Hollister Co., Tillys, Zumiez, Aeropostale, Champs Sports, Zara, Netflix House	1963	Simon Property Group (100%)
5	Aventura Mall	Aventura, Florida	Fort Lauderdale-Miami	2,700,000 square feet (250,000 m^{2})	300+	Nordstrom, Bloomingdale's, Macy's (2 stores), JCPenney, AMC Theatres, Apple Store, Eataly, Figs, Foot Locker, Google Store, Lego Store, The Cheesecake Factory, Uniqlo	1983	Simon Property Group (33.3%), Turnberry Associates
6	South Coast Plaza	Costa Mesa, California	Los Angeles	2,623,385 square feet (243,720.4 m^{2})	270	Macy's (3 stores – Main, Men's, and Home and Furniture), Nordstrom, Bloomingdale's, Swarovski, Hermes, Abercrombie & Fitch, Victoria's Secret, H&M, Zara, Louis Vuitton, Apple Store, Lego Store, Bath & Body Works, Gap	1967	Segerstrom family
7	Del Amo Fashion Center	Torrance, California	Los Angeles	2,517,765 square feet (233,908.0 m^{2})	255	Nordstrom, Macy's (2 stores – Main and Men's, Home, and Furniture), AMC Theatres, Mitsuwa Marketplace, JCPenney, Dick's Sporting Goods, Barnes & Noble, Dave & Buster's, Crate & Barrel, Kate Spade New York, Hugo Boss, Arhaus, lululemon, Apple Store, Madewell, Zara, adidas, Nike, Uniqlo, H&M, Express, Marshalls, Sephora, PacSun	1961	Simon Property Group (50%), JPMorgan Fleming Funds (25%), & Farallon Cap. Mgt. (25%)
8	Tysons Corner Center	Tysons, Virginia	Washington, D.C.	2,400,000 square feet (220,000 m^{2})	300+	Macy's, Nordstrom, AMC, Aritzia, Bloomingdale's, Kay Jewelers, Apple Store, Lego Store, Victoria's Secret, Uniqlo, H&M, Rivian (Upcoming) Satellite Mall (Tysons Galleria): Neiman Marcus, Louis Vuitton, Crate & Barrel, CMX Cinebistro, The Ritz-Carlton at Tysons Corner, Lucky Strike, Chanel, Lucid	1968	Macerich
9	Ala Moana Center	Honolulu, Hawaii	Honolulu	2,400,000 square feet (220,000 m^{2})	350	Macy's, Nordstrom, Shirokiya, Bloomingdale's, Target, Anthropologie, Louis Vuitton, Prada, The North Face, Apple Store, Lego Store, Victoria's Secret	1959	Brookfield Properties
10	Destiny USA	Syracuse, New York	Syracuse	2,400,000 square feet (220,000 m^{2})	239	Macy's, H&M, Dave & Buster's, Off Broadway Shoes, DSW Shoe Warehouse, Dick's Sporting Goods, Old Navy, Burlington Coat Factory, TJ Maxx, IMAX, Regal Cinemas, Apple Store, Embassy Suites, WonderWorks (museum), Funny Bone Comedy Club	1990	The Pyramid Companies
11	Roosevelt Field	Garden City, New York	New York City	2,372,053 square feet (220,370.9 m^{2})	243	Macy's, Bloomingdale's, Primark, Nordstrom, JCPenney, Dick's Sporting Goods, Neiman Marcus, AMC, Foot Locker, Apple Store	1956	Simon Property Group (100%)
12	Sawgrass Mills	Sunrise, Florida	Fort Lauderdale	2,370,610 square feet (220,237 m^{2})	400	P.F. Chang's China Bistro, Rainforest Cafe, Seasons 52, Marshalls, Books-A-Million, Dick's Sporting Goods, Bloomingdale's - The Outlet Store, Epic Athletic Club, Saks OFF 5TH, Gap Factory Outlet, Columbia Factory Store, Aritzia, Super Bins, H&M, Adidas, Charlotte Russe, Five Below, Primark, HomeSense, Super Target, TJ Maxx, Nike Factory Store, Lego Store, Burlington Coat Factory, Nordstrom Rack, The Cheesecake Factory, Old Navy Outlet, Yard House, Texas De Brazil, Regal Cinemas, IMAX, Villagio, Grand Lux Cafe, BrandsMart U.S.A.	1990	Simon Property Group (100%)
13	Palisades Center	West Nyack, New York	New York City	2,217,322 square feet (205,996.0 m^{2})	218	Barnes & Noble, Macy's, Target, Best Buy, AMC Theatres, Ice Rink, Dave & Buster's, Ferris Wheel, Carousel, Climb Adventure Ropes Course, Levity Live Comedy Club, K1 Speed Indoor Racetrack , Billy Beez	1998	Black Diamond Capital Management
14	Westfield Valley Fair	San Jose, California	San Francisco	2,200,000 square feet (200,000 m^{2})	236	Bloomingdale's, Eataly, Macy's (2 stores – Main and Men's, Home, and Furniture), Nordstrom, Alamo Drafthouse, Apple Store, Lego Store, Prada, Tiffany & Co., Gap, Michael Kors, Zales Jewelers, Sunglass Hut, Gucci, The North Face, Coach, Journeys, Yankee Candle, Abercrombie & Fitch, J.Crew	1986	Unibail-Rodamco-Westfield
15	Millcreek Mall	Erie, Pennsylvania	Erie	2,200,000 square feet (200,000 m^{2})	165	Macy's, JCPenney, Boscov's, H&M, Round One Entertainment, Dick's Sporting Goods	1975	Cafaro Company
16	Woodfield Mall	Schaumburg, Illinois	Chicago	2,154,014 square feet (200,114.4 m^{2})	234	JCPenney, Macy's, Nordstrom, Primark, Zellano Home, Enterrium, P.F. Chang's China Bistro, Texas De Brazil, The Cheesecake Factory, Improv Comedy Club, Apple Store, Build-A-Bear Workshop, F.Y.E., Lego Store, Peppa Pig World of Play	1971	Simon Property Group (50%)
17	Scottsdale Fashion Square	Scottsdale, Arizona	Phoenix	2,120,000 square feet (197,000 m^{2})	203	Macy's, Dick's Sporting Goods, Dillard's, Nordstrom, Neiman Marcus, Harkins Theatres	1961	Macerich
18	Westfield Garden State Plaza	Paramus, New Jersey	Newark	2,118,718 square feet (196,835.3 m^{2})	346	Macy's, Nordstrom, Neiman Marcus, AMC Theatres, Apple Store, Aritzia, Gap, Hollister Co., H&M, Louis Vuitton	1957	Unibail-Rodamco-Westfield
19	Lakewood Center	Lakewood, California	Los Angeles	2,069,000 square feet (192,200 m^{2})	225	Macy's, Target,JCPenney, Costco, Round 1 Entertainment	1951	Pacific Retail Capital Partners, Lyon Living, Silverpeak
20	Green Acres Mall	Valley Stream, New York	New York City	2,069,000 square feet (192,200 m^{2})	174	Macy's (2 stores), Primark, H&M, Champs Sports, ShopRite (coming soon)	1956	Macerich
21	Oakbrook Center	Oak Brook, Illinois	Chicago	2,018,000 square feet (187,500 m^{2})	175	Macy's, Nordstrom, Neiman Marcus, Louis Vuitton, Apple Store, Pinstripes, AMC Theatres.	1962	Brookfield Properties, CalPERS
22	NorthPark Center	Dallas, Texas	Dallas–Fort Worth	2,000,000 square feet (190,000 m^{2})	221	Dillard's, Macy's, Neiman Marcus, Nordstrom, AMC Theatres, Rolex, Nike, Steve Madden, Williams-Sonoma, Apple Store, Sephora	1965	NorthPark Development Company
