= American Dream (shopping mall) =

Megamall with attractions in East Rutherford, New Jersey, U.S.

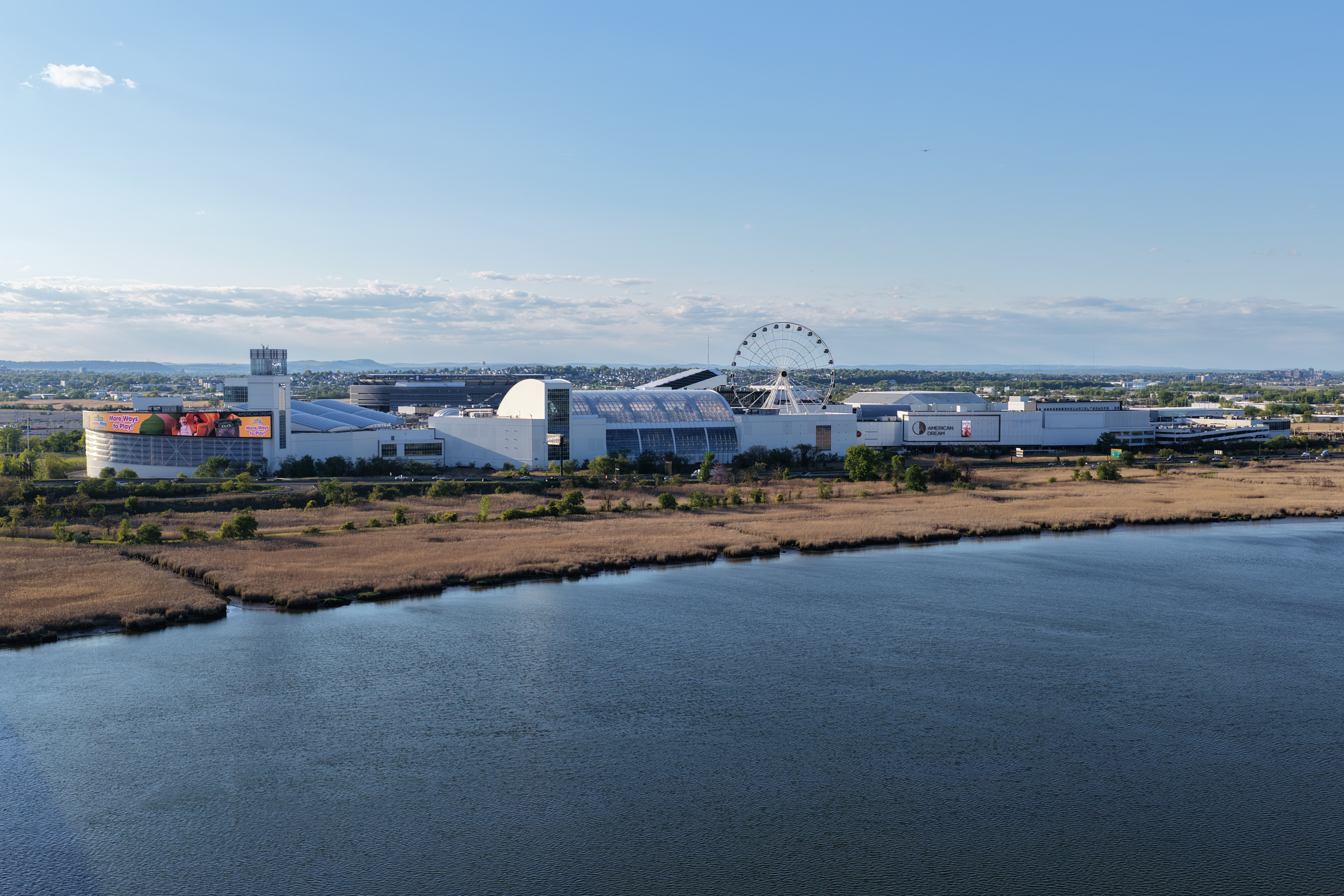
- Aerial imagery of the southeastern facade of the complex, as seen by drone over the Hackensack River (May 2026)
- Location: Meadowlands Sports Complex; East Rutherford, New Jersey, U.S.
- Coordinates: 40°48′36″N 74°04′03″W
- Address: 1 American Dream Way, 07073
- Opened: October 25, 2019; 7 years ago (Nickelodeon Universe and Ice Rink); December 5, 2019; 6 years ago (Big Snow); October 1, 2020; 6 years ago (DreamWorks Water Park, retail stores and dining); September 17, 2021; 5 years ago (luxury wing)
- Previous names: Meadowlands Mills (1994–2002); Meadowlands Xanadu (2002–2010); The Meadowlands (2010–2011); American Dream Meadowlands (2011–2019)
- Developer: The Mills Corporation (1994–2006); Mack-Cali Realty Corporation (2003–2006); KanAm USA Management (2003–2006); Colony Capital Acquisitions LLC (2006–2011); Related Companies (2010–2011); Triple Five Group (2011–2019)
- Manager: Ameream, LLC (subsidiary of Triple Five Group)
- Owner: Triple Five Group
- Architect: Gensler; Adamson Architects, Inc.; GH+A Design Studios; RSM Design
- Num. of stores: 450+ (at peak)
- Num. of anchor tenants: 6 (at peak)
- Floor area: 3,000,000 square feet (280,000 m^{2}) ranked 2nd
- Floors: 3 (2 in Barneys New York, Primark and Zara)
- Parking: Parking lot and parking garage with 33,000 paid spaces (Free for 15–30 minutes only)
- Public transit: Meadowlands station Meadowlands Rail Line 85, 355, 356, 703, 772
- Website: www.americandream.com
- Building details
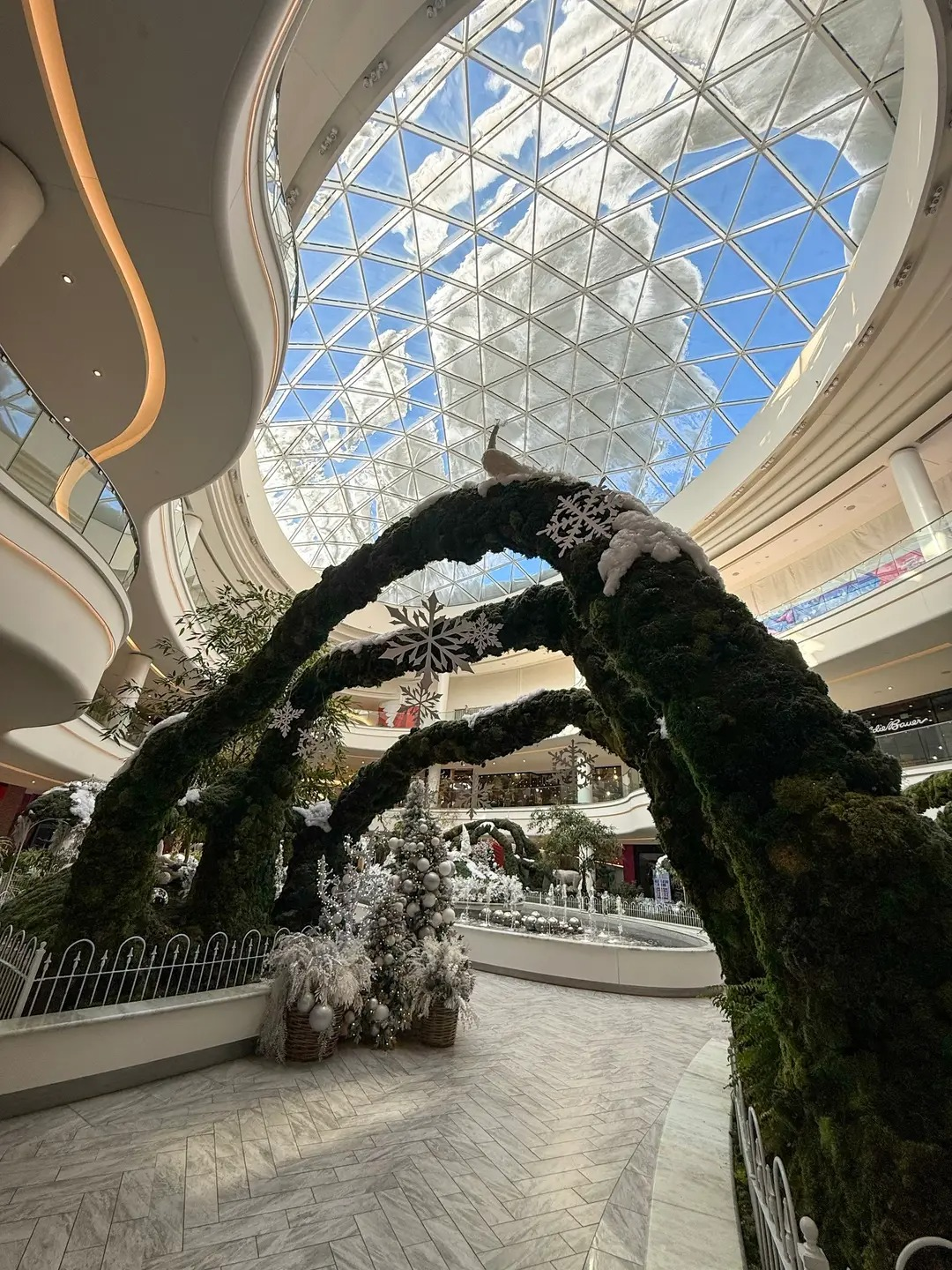
- Interior view (February 2026)

General information
- Status: Operational
- Type: Outlet mall (1994–2002); Shopping mall and entertainment venue (2002–present)
- Construction started: September 29, 2004 (resumed May 2009, November 2013 and late June 2017)
- Completed: 2021

Design and construction
- Main contractor: PCL Construction; Whiting-Turner Contracting Company (until 2013); Lehman Brothers (until 2009)

American Dream is a super-regional shopping mall and entertainment complex in the Meadowlands Sports Complex in East Rutherford, New Jersey, and is the second largest mall in the United States behind the Mall of America. Its four opening stages occurred on October 25, 2019; December 5, 2019; October 1, 2020; and September 17, 2021.

The project was first proposed in February 2003 by the Mills Corporation as the Meadowlands Xanadu, (Note: Also called: Xanadu Meadowlands in some sources.) with construction beginning in September 2004. The company's previous proposal on a separate site, Meadowlands Mills, was never developed due to legal oppositions regarding environmental concerns. In January 2007, the project was taken over by Colony Capital Acquisitions LLC after Mills suffered from severe financial problems. In May 2009, construction stalled due to the bankruptcy of Lehman Brothers. Triple Five Group announced intent to take over the mall in May 2011, and on July 31, 2013, officially gained control of the mall and the surrounding site. Following a series of ownership changes, financing issues, construction delays, and legal challenges, construction stopped again in December 2016.

In late June 2017, construction had resumed, after new financing had been secured, though the project would suffer a series of "chronically delayed" opening dates. Among the attractions that opened in 2019 were the Nickelodeon Universe theme park in October and the Big Snow American Dream indoor ski slope in December. The DreamWorks Water Park, which was scheduled to open March 19, 2020, as well as the mall's retail shops and restaurants, were delayed by the COVID-19 pandemic, which forced the mall's temporary closure on March 8, 2020. Following Governor Phil Murphy's August 26 announcement that amusements could open with restrictions on September 1, Big Snow American Dream announced it would reopen on that date, while other amusements and the mall's first major retail outlets reopened on October 1, 2020. As of August 2024, the mall hosted approximately 450 retail tenants, although legal and financial challenges persist.

== History ==
=== 1994–2002: Meadowlands Mills ===
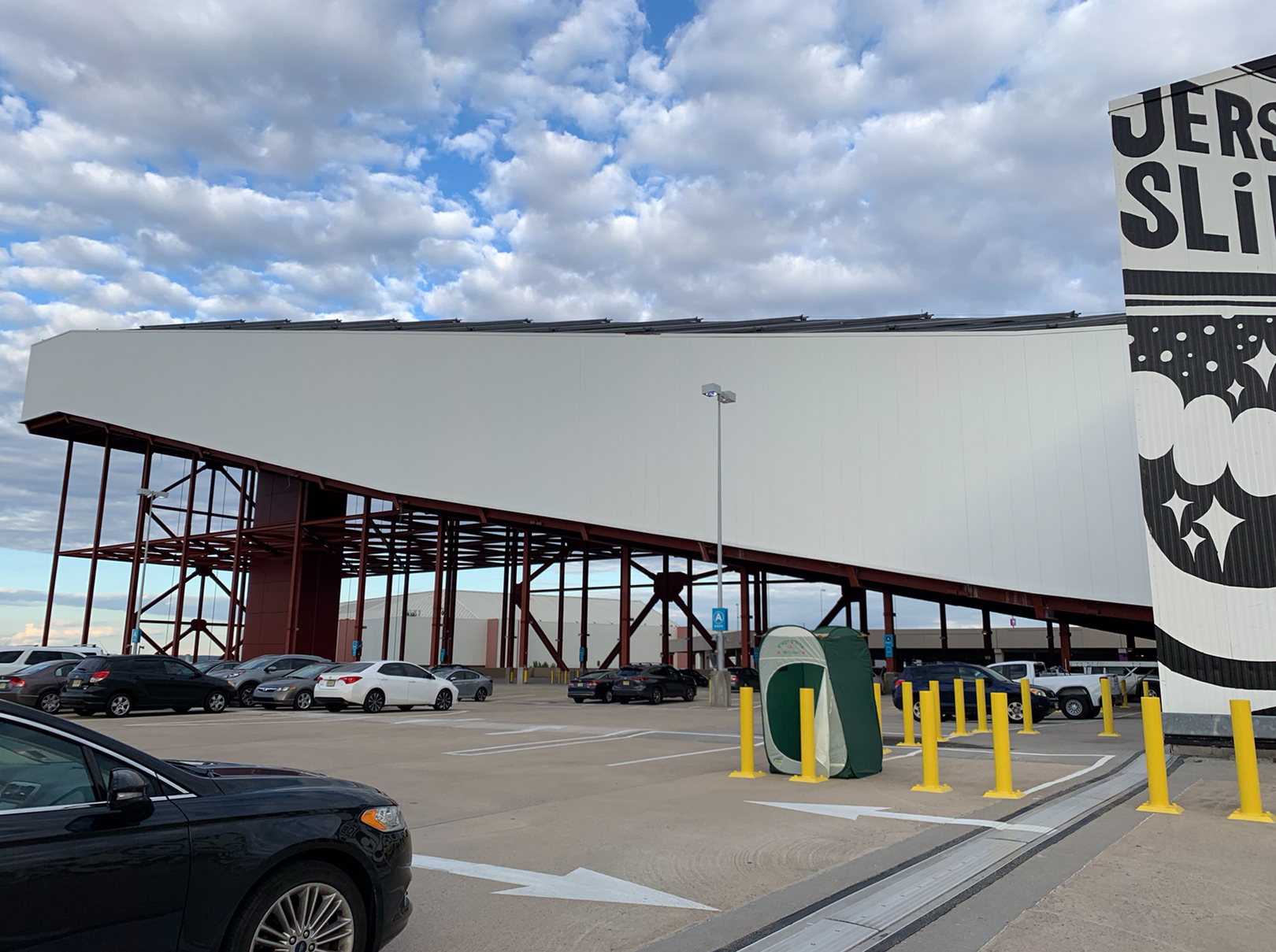
Exterior view of Big Snow American Dream (October 2020)

The Arlington, Virginia-based Mills Corporation first began working on plans for an outlet mall in the New Jersey Meadowlands in 1994 that would utilize the company's "shoppertainment" model used for Landmark Mills malls that combined retail outlets with entertainment facilities. Meadowlands Mills, as it was called, would have been constructed on the Empire Tract, an area of 587 acres (238 ha) of wetlands in Carlstadt, New Jersey. The tract was owned by Empire Ltd., a company which had purchased the land in 1961, and had been planning a major development since 1987. The commercial development would have consisted of 2.1 million square feet (200,000 m^{2}) of retail space, a hotel, and 1 million square feet (93,000 m^{2}) of office space on 206 acres (83 ha) of the tract. To mitigate the heavy environmental impact, the remainder of the tract would have been converted into stormwater retention basins.

After Empire and Mills announced their proposal in 1996, the project quickly became controversial and faced opposition from a variety of environmental and conservationist groups, as well as the tract's congressman, Steve Rothman. Opponents stated that the mall would have a devastating impact on the ecological health of the area, while the Mills Corporation defended its plans by arguing that the land was already devastated by pesticide usage and invasive common reeds.

The Environmental Protection Agency and the Fish and Wildlife Service opposed the project after studying its potential environmental impact. However, the Army Corps of Engineers conducted its own study which contradicted the EPA's findings and stated that the project was not a threat to the Meadowlands area. New Jersey governor Donald DiFrancesco announced plans to protect the area in 2001, encouraging the Mills Corp. to look at other potential sites in the region. His successor, Jim McGreevey, informed Mills the following year that the state government would not provide permits for the mall, effectively ending the project as originally proposed. The Empire Tract was later permanently protected by the Meadowlands Conservation Trust, which purchased it in 2005 and renamed it the Richard P. Kane Natural Area after a noted New Jersey conservationist.

=== 2002–2011: Meadowlands Xanadu ===
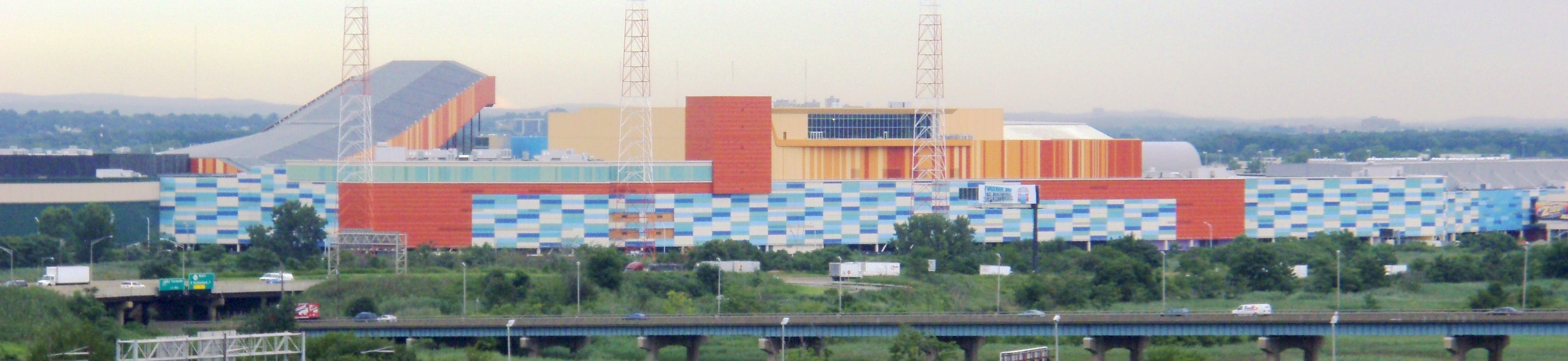
As seen from across the Hackensack River in Secaucus, New Jersey in August 2009

Former logo (2002–2006)

In July 2002, the New Jersey Sports and Exposition Authority (NJSEA) issued a request for proposal for a project in the area that was then the parking lot of the Continental Airlines Arena. The request was inspired by the Meadowlands Mills project as well as by plans to move the New Jersey Nets out of the arena, and involved significantly less environmental damage because it would be built on already developed land. The Mills Corporation retooled its earlier proposal for Meadowlands Mills to fit the new site, and partnered with Mack-Cali Realty Corporation to design Meadowlands Xanadu, a major multi-use development which would incorporate a renovated Continental Airlines Arena. The name was taken from the Mills Corporation's Madrid Xanadú, a shopping mall in Spain which opened in May 2003. NJSEA accepted several other proposals for developing the site. Westfield Group proposed Arena Place, an "urban village" and "town square" built around the arena. Hartz Mountain Industries and Forest City Realty Trust submitted plans for Expo Park at the Meadowlands, featuring an outlet mall, a convention center, an indoor racetrack, and three hotel buildings. Triple Five Group proposed MeadowFest America, which planned an adaptive reuse of the arena to create a retail and entertainment complex.

Other proposals focused on the project's location in the Meadowlands Sports Complex. International Speedway Corporation envisioned plans for Sports City America, a development centered around the proposed Garden State International Speedway, a NASCAR racetrack seating 80,000. A consortium that included Paul Newman, Carl Haas, and Mario Andretti proposed Liberty Speedway and Family Theme Park, combining a racetrack with an amusement park and connecting the two with a monorail. In February 2003, the authority's board chose the Mills Corporation and Mack-Cali's plan over the other two finalists, Westfield Group and Hartz Mountain Industries. The project was billed by Mills chairman and executive officer Laurence C. Siegel as "...a new standard for bringing lifestyle, recreation, sports and family entertainment offerings together in one location." Ground was broken on the complex on September 29, 2004, and, at the time, was expected to open two years later. However, in May 2006, the Securities and Exchange Commission (SEC) announced it was formally investigating the Mills Corporation after it announced that it was restating four years of earnings due to executive misconduct and accounting errors. Later in the year, an analyst at Bank of America Securities forced Mills to abandon the project, citing the signs of cost overruns. In November 2006, Colony Capital Acquisitions LLC purchased the project from the Mills Corporation for $500 million and pushed the projected opening to 2008. The Mills Corporation was acquired by Simon Property Group in April 2007, permanently ending any involvement with the property.

In October 2007, the Federal Aviation Administration expressed concerns about the height of the Ferris wheel, which at the time was planned to be 287 ft (87 m), which the FAA feared would affect local air traffic to and from Teterboro Airport. By 2008, the colorfully gaudy exterior of the unfinished building, which is visible from the New Jersey Turnpike and New Jersey Route 3, began to draw criticism as an eyesore. Richard Codey, president of the New Jersey State Senate at the time, called the structure "yucky-looking". In April 2011, then-Governor Chris Christie called it "an offense to the eyes as you drive up the turnpike" and "by far the ugliest damn building in New Jersey, and maybe America." After acquiring the project, Triple Five indicated the exterior would be repainted in a different color scheme.

Another former logo (2006–2011)

In May 2009, construction on Xanadu, which was nearly 80% complete (and whose common areas were about 88% complete), came to a halt again after a subsidiary of bankrupt Lehman Brothers missed payments, causing other lenders to withdraw from the project, and lost $500 million worth of construction funding. Developers stated the mall was 70% leased at the time. In March 2009, the retailer Cabela's announced that it did not plan to open its Meadowlands location for another year, and subsequently gave "late 2010" as an estimated opening date. It would later pull out of the project by November 2010, following the collapse of Lehman Brothers and a halt to construction. In February 2010, Stephen M. Ross, owner of Related Companies in Manhattan, stated that he could finish the project by the end of 2010, possibly with a new name and look. In May 2010, the NJSEA handed the project over to the Related Companies, and the "Xanadu" name had been dropped, changing the name to simply "The Meadowlands".

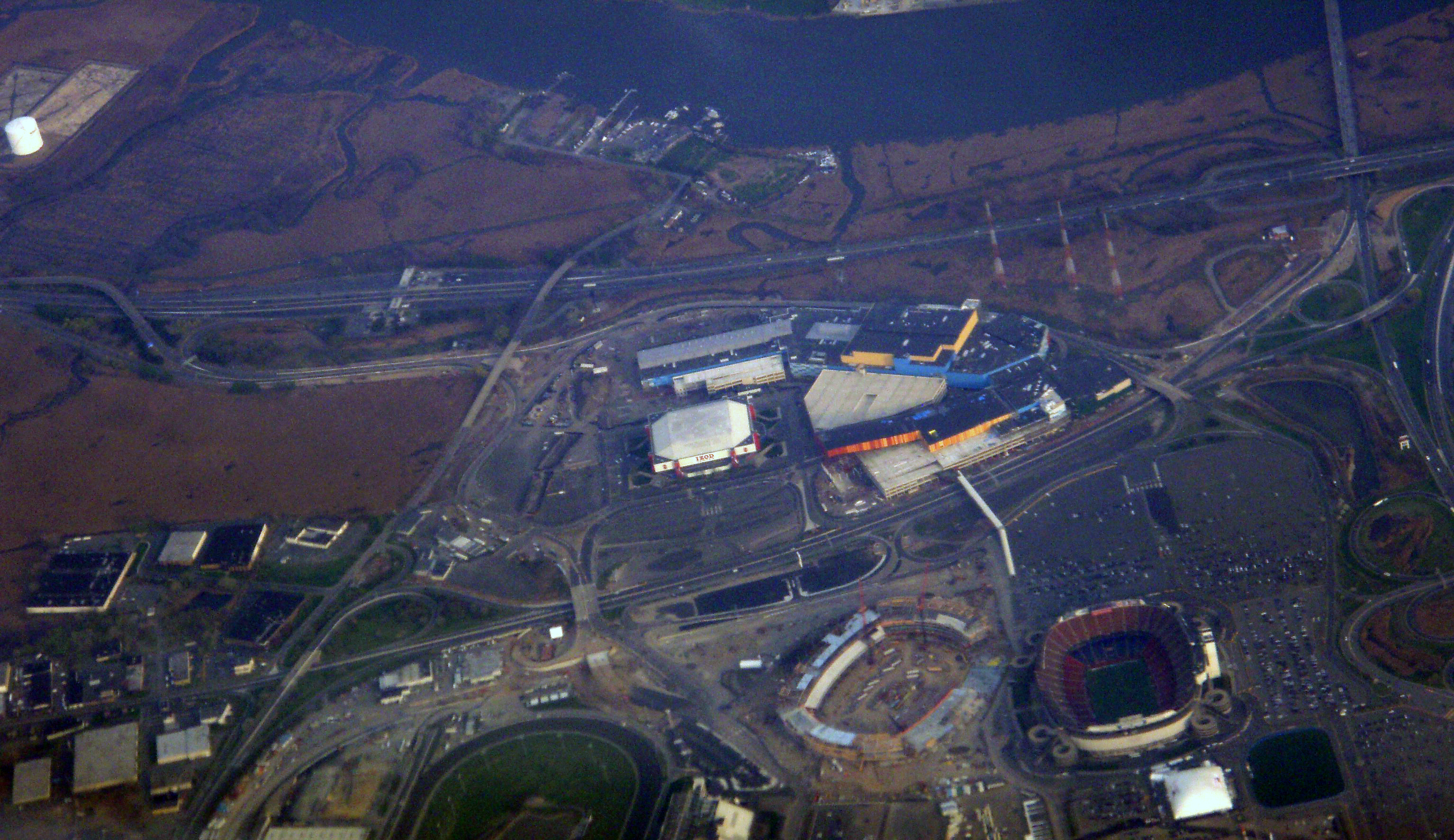
An April 2008 aerial view of Meadowlands Xanadu and MetLife Stadium, both under construction

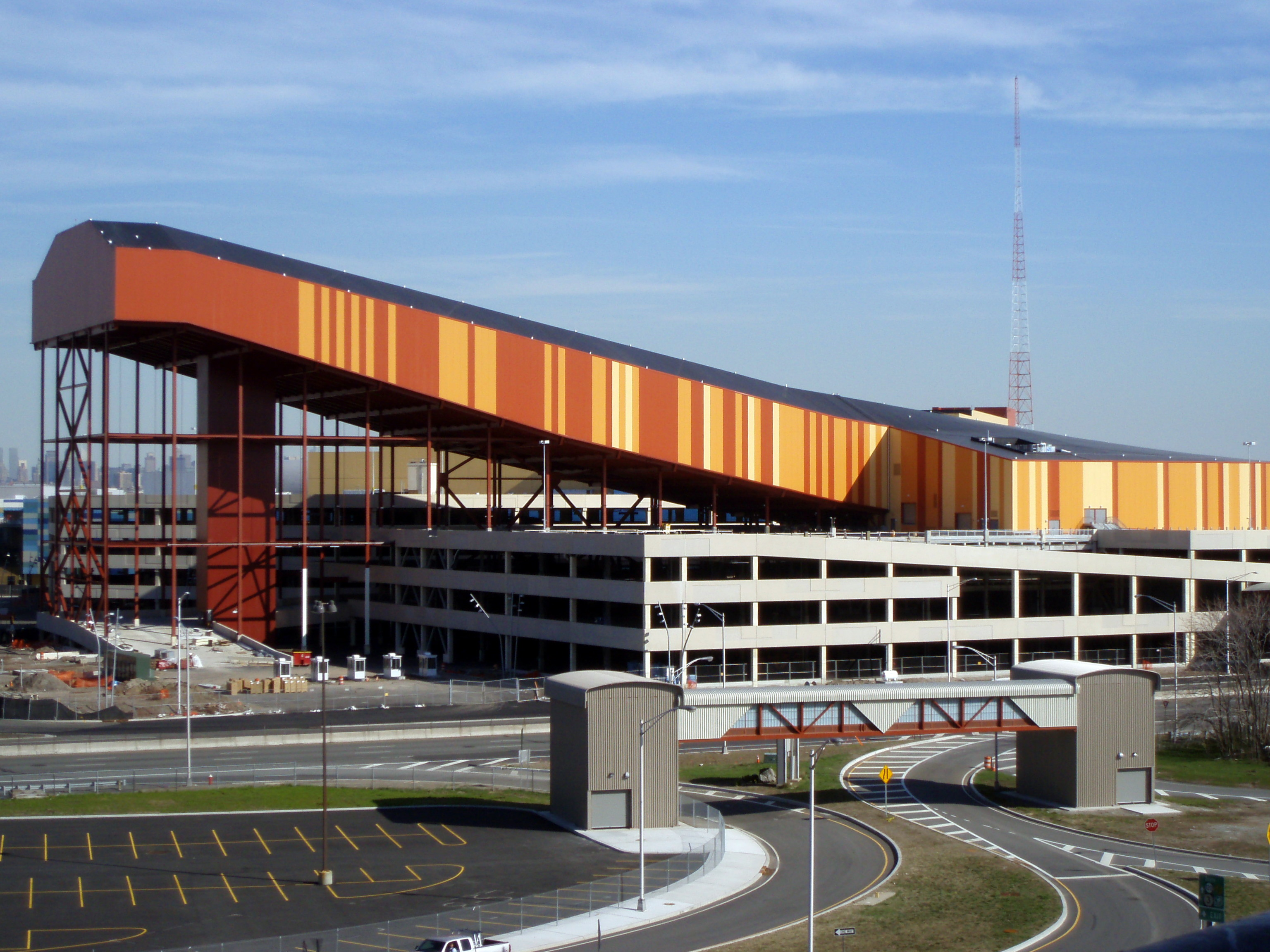
Big Snow American Dream (then known as the Meadowlands Xanadu indoor ski slope park) under construction (April 2009)

Opposition to the idea of building a permanent shopping center within the Meadowlands Sports Complex centered on traffic and environmental concerns. The project was built on state-owned land, as the NJSEA is a state agency, and $81.3 million was spent on transportation improvements such as new off and on ramps and a train station at the Sports Complex. Some have also called the mall a "colossal real estate nightmare", and "perhaps the worst retail failure ever". On August 10, 2010, Colony Capital surrendered control of the development of the mall to five lenders. Four parties were noted to be interested in redeveloping the project. The Wall Street Journal on December 24, 2010, reported that Triple Five Group signed a letter of intent to invest in and finish the stalled mall. Triple Five proposed that the mall be expanded to include indoor amusement and a water park. Developers cut a deal with Deutsche Bank to provide an approximately $700 million loan to finish the project.

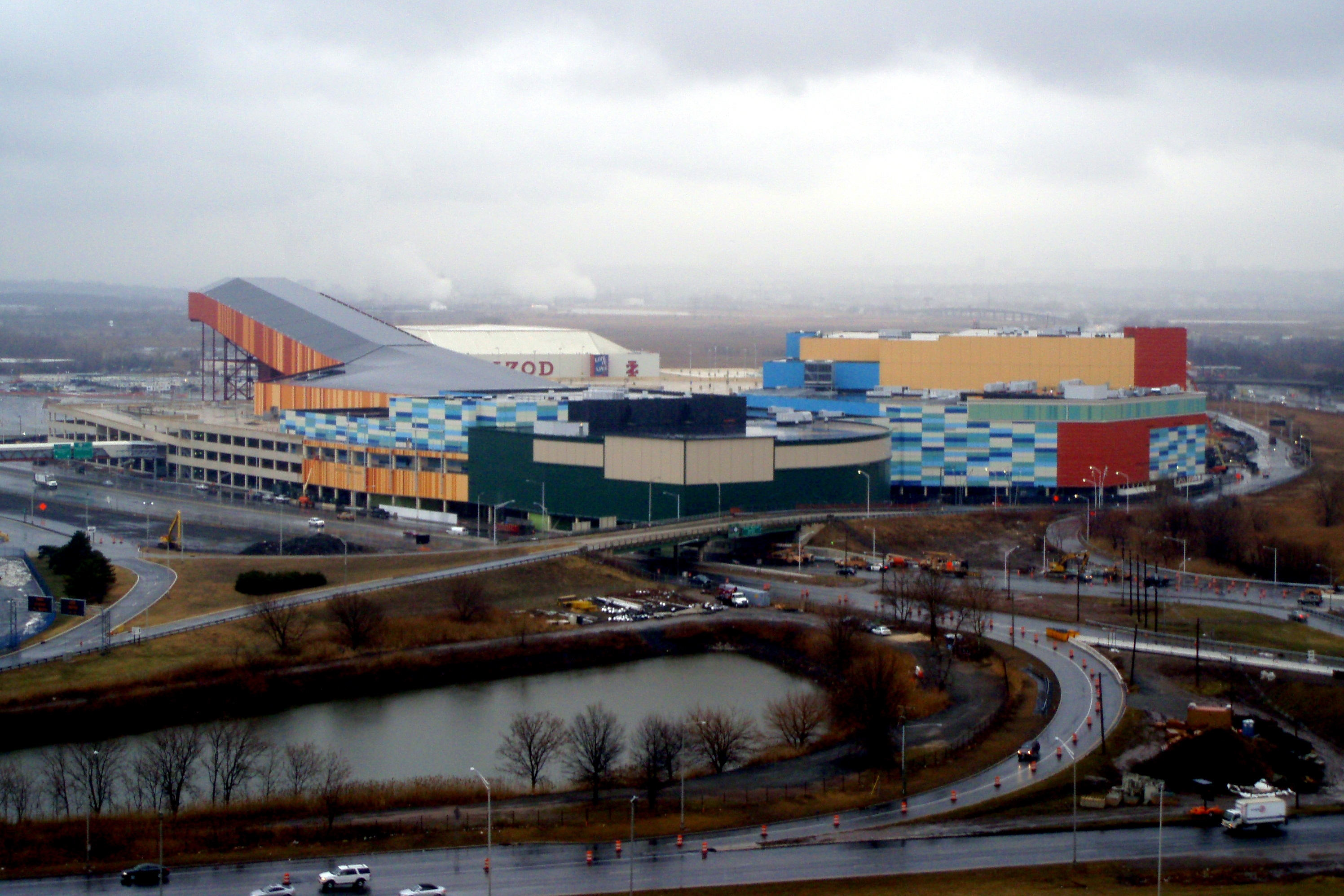
The complex seen from the Meadowlands Sheraton in March 2009

On February 1, 2011, after a record-breaking month of snow for the area, a 50- to 60-foot-long section of the eastern wall had buckled, and a horizontal crease was apparent on the complex's indoor ski slope. Two days later, on February 3, after workers were attempting to melt snow from the ski slope's roof, ice build-up caused the eastern wall to fail and suffer a partial collapse along an approximately 150-foot (50 m) length of roof. Michael Beckerman, a spokesman for the project's lending group stated, "The Lender Group is aware of the damage to the roof caused by excessive snow and ice, but does not feel the damage affects the integrity of the structure. As such, the group has filed an insurance claim, and once the weather turns warmer, it will assess the damages and fix whatever is necessary."

=== 2011–2016: American Dream Meadowlands ===
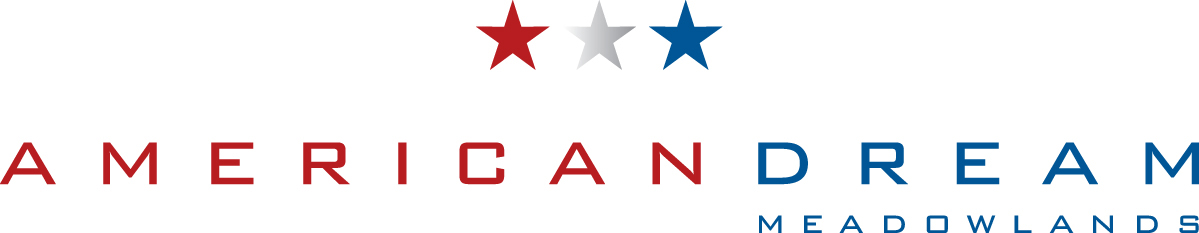
Original logo (2011–2019)

On April 29, 2011, the New Jersey Sports and Exposition Authority completed a deal with the Canadian Triple Five Group, the developers, owners and operators of two of North America's largest malls: West Edmonton Mall and the Mall of America, who had previously proposed MeadowFest America for the New Jersey site in 2002, before the contract was awarded to the Mills Corporation. Triple Five assumed ownership of the mall and renamed it "American Dream Meadowlands", announcing a tentative opening date of early 2014, to coincide with Super Bowl XLVIII at MetLife Stadium. The deal was officially announced on May 3, 2011. Among the changes to the project would be an expansion to 3 million square feet, an 8.5-acre indoor glass-domed amusement park, water parks, and an ice skating rink. In July 2012, DreamWorks Animation CEO Jeffrey Katzenberg announced that a DreamWorks Water Park would open at the mall.

In June 2012, the New York Giants and the New York Jets sought an injunction against Triple Five from resuming construction after it took over the project from the Mills Corporation, stating that the addition of amusement and water parks at the site would adversely affect traffic at MetLife Stadium on days when home games were played there, specifically 16 Sundays out of the year, the day of the week that Bergen County's Blue Law prohibits shopping, though not amusement parks. The teams contended that while the mall would be closed on Sundays, the amusement park would not, which would create traffic jams on game days, when between 20,000 and 25,000 vehicles would park at the complex. Traffic studies conducted by the team estimated that 7,700 spots would be added by the project, while developers stated that it would add only 63 more cars, as local residents would be wise enough to avoid the grounds at that time, and most tourists would take the rail link to the MetLife Stadium site rather than drive. Triple Five objected to the law's restriction because it would infringe upon their business. In July 2012, Triple Five countersued for what it called an improper campaign by the teams to preserve their monopoly at the site, while dissuading potential lenders from investing. The project was criticized even further by environmentalists who issued a complaint on July 10, 2012, that draft permits approved by the Army Corps of Engineers would allow five more acres of wetlands to be destroyed for the project, which had already filled in more than seven. Jeff Tittel, director of the New Jersey chapter of the Sierra Club, stated, "This project will increase traffic and flooding while taking business away from existing stores. This project is the Super Bowl of Sprawl and the American Dream is a commuter's nightmare." On March 12, 2014, the parties reached a tentative settlement, agreeing to drop their lawsuits. Though specific details of the agreement were not made public, the agreement allowed the long-delayed project to move forward. Construction had been ongoing since November 2013, and was expected to pick up in early 2014. That April, Triple Five released a revised design for the mall's exterior and confirmed a tentative opening date in late 2016, though by December 2014, it was reported that this would only be a partial opening. Triple Five officially took ownership of the mall on July 31, 2013, with construction set to start in late August of that year, despite the lawsuit.

In February 2015, U.S. federal prosecutors accused Joe Ferriero, former chairman of the Bergen County Democratic Organization and New Jersey political power broker, of bribery, fraud, and racketeering charges. The charges included an allegation that Mills Corporation paid Ferriero $1.7 million over the course of several years as a bribe or extortion to maintain Ferriero's political support for their development bid on the Xanadu project against rivals Hartz Mountain Industries. James Dausch, a former Mills Corporation employee, testified that the $1.7 million was paid for Ferriero's consulting, not as a bribe. Dausch's testimony detailed much of the development bid process, including paid lobbyists positioning Mills with Governor Jim McGreevey, then Governor Richard Codey, as well as with Senator Robert Menendez. In April 2015, Ferriero was found guilty on five counts, but not on the Mills Corporation racketeering charges.

In June 2015, the New Jersey Local Finance Board approved a tax-sharing plan between East Rutherford and Triple Five. In August 2015, the New Jersey Economic Development Authority reauthorized a $390 million potential tax break for the project. These steps were intended to set the stage for a sale of up to $1 billion in government bonds to raise money to complete the project in time for its new projected completion in the second half of 2017. In April 2016, a planned bond issue fell through. In July 2016, construction appeared to have stopped, the developers were trying to obtain $1 billion in additional financing, and the projected completion date had slipped again, to 2018. In August 2016, the New Jersey Sports and Exposition Authority announced an $800 million bond issue intended to finance further construction of the mall.

In September 2016, Triple Five Group announced that the indoor amusement park space would be occupied by Nickelodeon Universe, which would feature two world record-holding roller coasters. The TMNT Shellraiser, a Euro-Fighter, would hold the record for the steepest roller coaster drop at 121.5 degrees, and is based on a model seen at two other locations in the United States. The second coaster, a Spinning Coaster called The Shredder, consists of four-passenger cars that spin on a vertical axis as it progresses down the coaster's track, and is the world's tallest and longest free spinning coaster, at 1,600 ft (19,000 in). The water park is DreamWorks Water Park, which will feature attractions such as Shrek's Soggy Swamp, Kung Fu Panda Zone and Madagascar Rain Forest. The park's centerpiece will be the world's largest indoor wave pool, measuring 1.5 acres (0.61 ha) and holding 1.5 million US gallons (5,700,000 L) of water, and the world's second-tallest body slide, starting from a height of 142 ft (1,700 in) and featuring a 50-foot (600 in) free fall. The completed American Dream spans 3 million square feet and consists of 55 percent entertainment facilities and 45 percent retail locations. Planned entertainment venues included nightclubs, a 26-screen movie theater and 3,000-seat performing arts theater. The mall would house 450 retail shops, and more than 100 dining options, including approximately 20 full-service restaurants, a first-of-its kind kosher food hall, and a 38,000-square-foot (3,500 m^{2}) gourmet food court with 18 vendors and chef demonstrations operated by the youth-driven food and culture website Munchies. The project would also include a parking lot with 33,000 spaces, an on-site bus hub, and a train station. Triple Five projected 40 million people to visit the mall each year, half of whom would be drawn from the 62 million tourists who visit the tri-state area annually.

=== 2016–2019: Construction halts and resumes again ===
On December 22, 2016, work on the project stopped again. Financing from the planned 2016 bond issue was delayed until 2017. In May of that year, the developers secured $1.67 billion in construction financing from a private lending syndicate led by JPMorgan Chase, and by the following month, work had resumed.

The State of New Jersey, through the New Jersey Sports and Exhibition Authority, issued $1.15 billion in tax-free bonds in June 2017 to support the project. These unrated bonds yielded 6.625% when first issued. They were part of a suite of tax concessions negotiated with the state and the City of Hackensack.

In June 2018, the developer indicated that most of the complex was scheduled to open in early 2019, though the water park would open at the end of 2019. In August 2018, a Triple Five executive, Tony Amrlin, specified that the project was 68% complete and would open in April 2019. That November, it was announced that September 2019 would be the water park's opening date.

In August 2018, Triple Five revealed that H&M, Uniqlo, and Zara would open stores at the mall; the three stores would be those companies' largest mall-based flagship locations. On September 25, 2018, the New Jersey Hall of Fame announced that they would be permanently moving to American Dream. On March 12, 2019, Barneys New York announced that it would open a flagship store at the mall, its only one in New Jersey. However, the firm announced in October 2019 that as part of its Chapter 11 bankruptcy reorganization, it would close most of its stores, without specifying whether the one at American Dream would be one of the few to remain open.

In October 2019, Triple Five dropped "Meadowlands" from the name American Dream. On March 8, 2019, Governor Phil Murphy indicated that the mall complex would open that June, but on March 25, Triple 5 Group announced that the project would open in August. On May 20, Triple Five announced that the mall's opening date had again been moved to later in the year, and that some retailers would not open until the 2019 holiday season or early 2020. It revealed that tenants would include Tiffany & Co., Watches of Switzerland, Dolce & Gabbana, Moncler and the experimental retailer Fourpost, which operates a store at Triple Five's other mall property, the Mall of America. Triple Five also revealed more of the complex's attractions and common areas, which were planned to feature rotating art installations and attractions.

In June 2019, Triple Five announced a 10-year partnership with The Coca-Cola Company and its local bottling partner Liberty Coca-Cola Beverages, which would fully integrate the Coca-Cola brand throughout American Dream, and would include a branded eatery. On July 3, 2019, officials from Triple Five announced that the opening date of the mall would be October 25. Later that month, Crain's New York Business reported that the Asian-American supermarket chain H Mart would open a 35,000-square-foot (3,300 m^{2}) store at American Dream, which in addition to that chain's typical selection of Asian and international food items, would feature the chain's "Market Eatery" venue for top national and international food concepts and chefs, as well as New Jersey's first "Let Them Talk Bar and Stage" that would feature live music, craft cocktails, entertainment and weekly events. The store will staff a combined 70 to 100 full-time and part-time employees.

=== 2019–2020: Completion, grand opening, and COVID-19 pandemic temporary closure ===
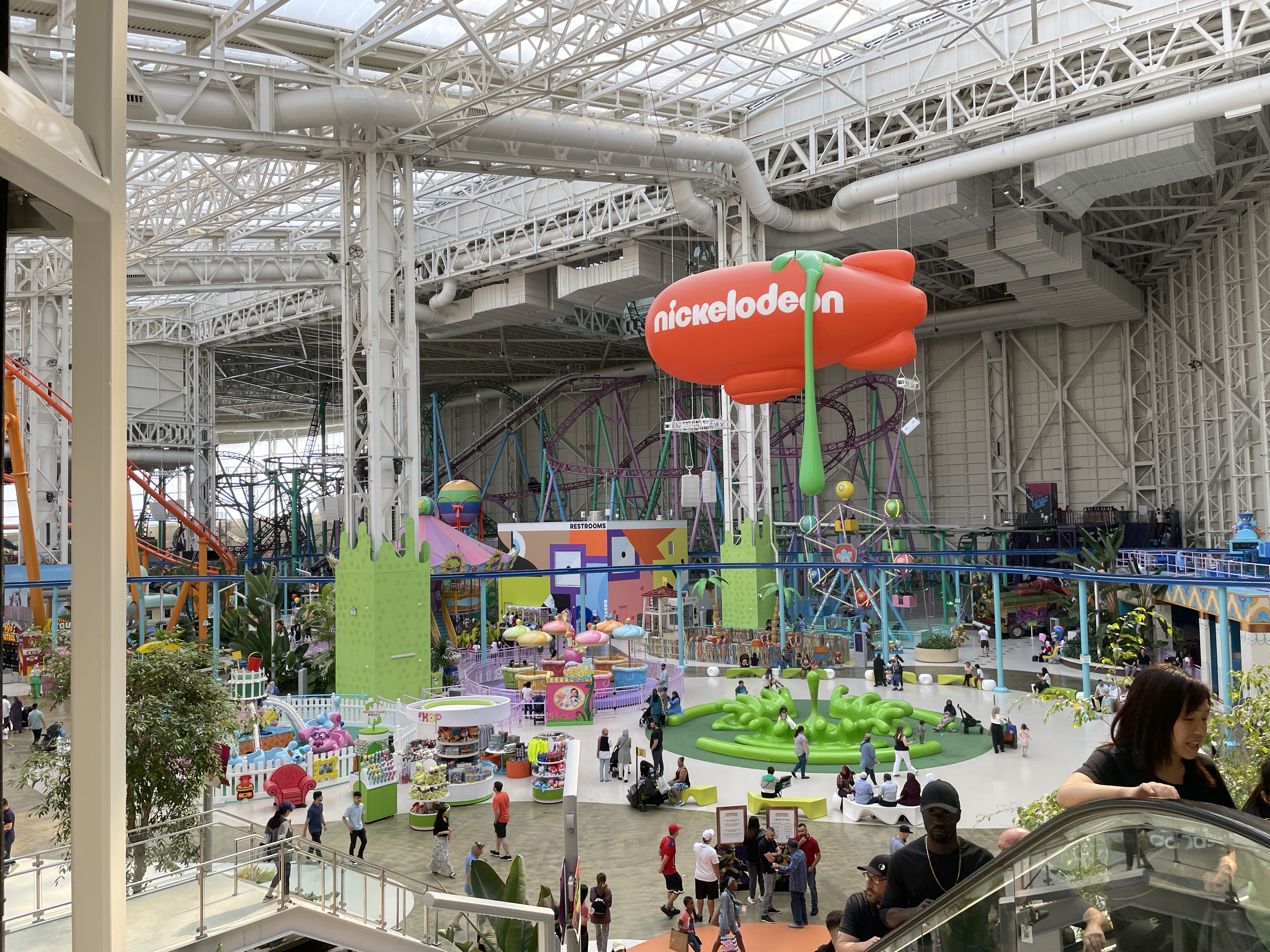
Nickelodeon Universe amusement park at American Dream Mall in June 2023

On September 20, 2019, Triple Five announced that the mall would open in four stages it refers to as "chapters." In October 2019, the mall's much-criticized colorful exterior was repainted white. Triple Five also announced that the ski slope would be covered in a mural painted by a Canadian artist collective, set to be completed in 2020. Much of the facade facing the Turnpike would be covered in dynamic LED displays.

In August 2019, Hard Rock Cafe was announced to open a restaurant at American Dream. However, following the pandemic, plans were temporarily on hold, but ultimately, as of January 2021, the restaurant was never developed. On October 25, 2019, the mall opened its first chapter, an ice-skating rink and a Nickelodeon Universe indoor theme park, which contained more than 35 rides and attractions. The next chapter, the DreamWorks Water Park, was set to open on November 27, 2019. However, on November 21, 2019, the company announced that they were postponing the water park opening until March 19, 2020. The next chapter, the Big Snow American Dream ski slope, opened on December 5, 2019.

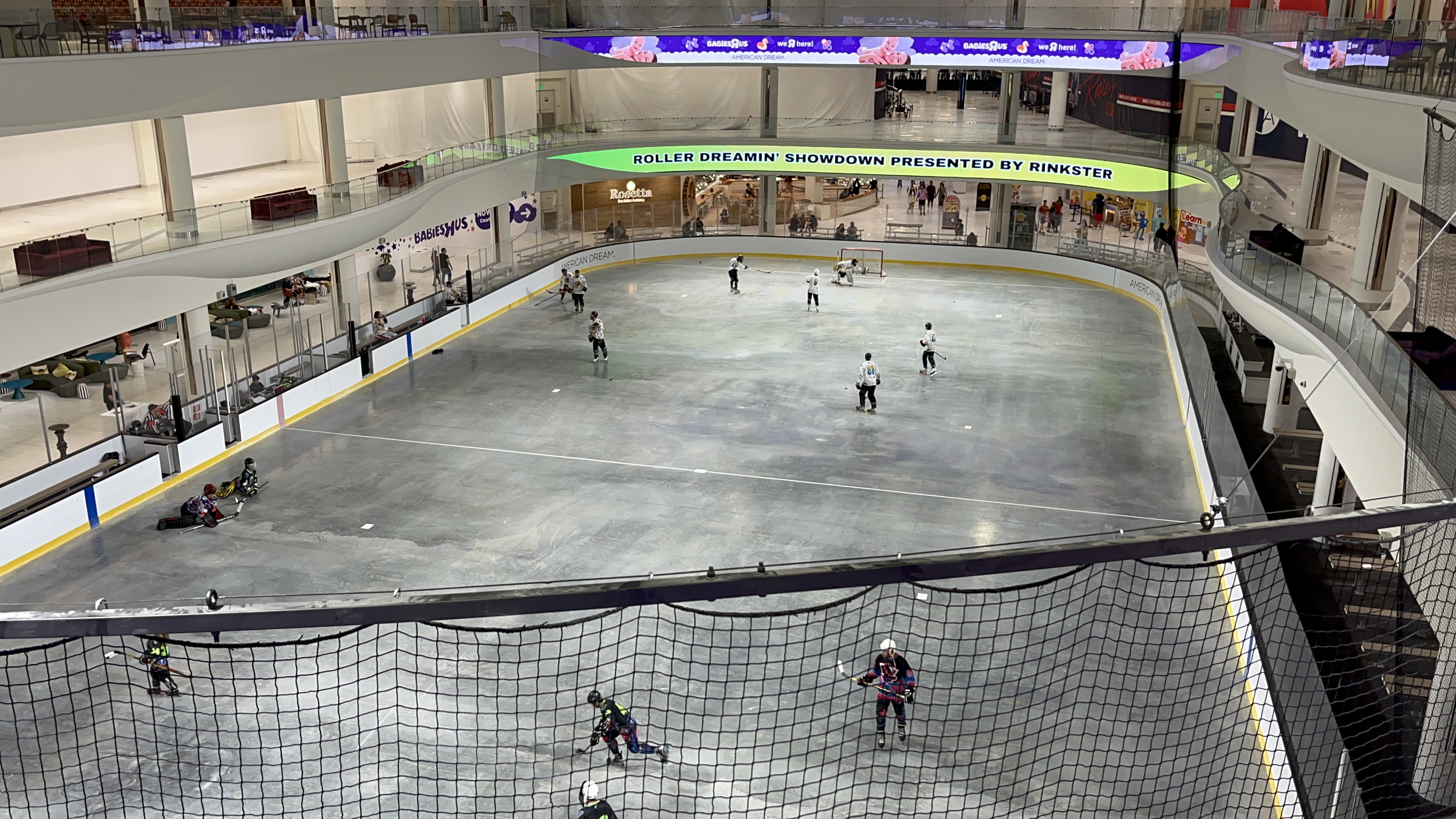
The Rink at American Dream during warmups of a roller hockey game, c. July 2024

The final chapter, consisting of the mall's 350 shops and over 100 restaurants, was branded "In Grand Style", and planned for a March 2020 opening. However, on February 27, 2020, NJ.com reported that the mall's enclave of luxury stores called The Collections would open in September 2020. On February 19, 2020, Sea Life announced it would open its location at American Dream on April 23, 2020.

On March 8, 2020, the mall closed, which Triple Five Worldwide announced was a temporary measure resulting from the COVID-19 pandemic in New Jersey, thus again delaying the opening of its retail shops and the DreamWorks Water Park. That same day, it was announced that Forever 21 pulled out of American Dream, due to the company filing for bankruptcy.

In April 2020, Triple Five announced that the proportion of the retail tenants at the mall would be smaller, as the mall would consist of approximately 70% entertainment and 30% retail. Among the newly announced entertainment venues would be a trampoline park, eight more rides to Nickelodeon Universe, and interactive museums featuring elaborate props and backdrops. Plans were also in the works for several hotels that would connect to the mall via skybridges, with the area zoned for 3,500 hotel rooms. That same month, the mall partnered with Hackensack Meridian Health and Agile Urgent Care to open a drive-through testing site primarily for local police, first responders, and frontline health care workers.

On May 5, 2020, it was announced that Lord & Taylor would no longer be a tenant at American Dream, due to the company's decision to liquidate all of its stores as soon as the company reopened, in anticipation of a bankruptcy process brought about by the pandemic.

On June 24, 2020, GNC announced that it would also no longer operate a store at the mall. Barneys New York had also withdrawn from American Dream, and several other tenants were considering canceling their leases or reducing their space at the mall. Governor Phil Murphy announced on August 26, 2020, that amusements could open with restrictions by September 1, prompting Big Snow American Dream to announce it would reopen on that date.

On September 3, 2020, Triple Five announced that on October 1, American Dream would reopen its amusement park, water park, ice rink, and mini-golf arcade, each of which would limit patrons to 25% of capacity. The mall would also unveil its first major retail tenants, 17 of which had been given certificates of occupancy and were ready to open. Among these were H&M, Primark, Zara, and IT'SUGAR. On September 29, 2020, it was announced that the Sea Life Aquarium and the Legoland Discovery Center would open at some point in early 2021.

On September 9, 2020, American Dream and Hackensack Meridian Health announced a ten-year partnership. The partnership includes opening an urgent care center at the complex, helping the complex reopen during the COVID-19 pandemic, and having pop-up events at American Dream about health and wellness.

=== 2020–present: Reopening and beyond ===
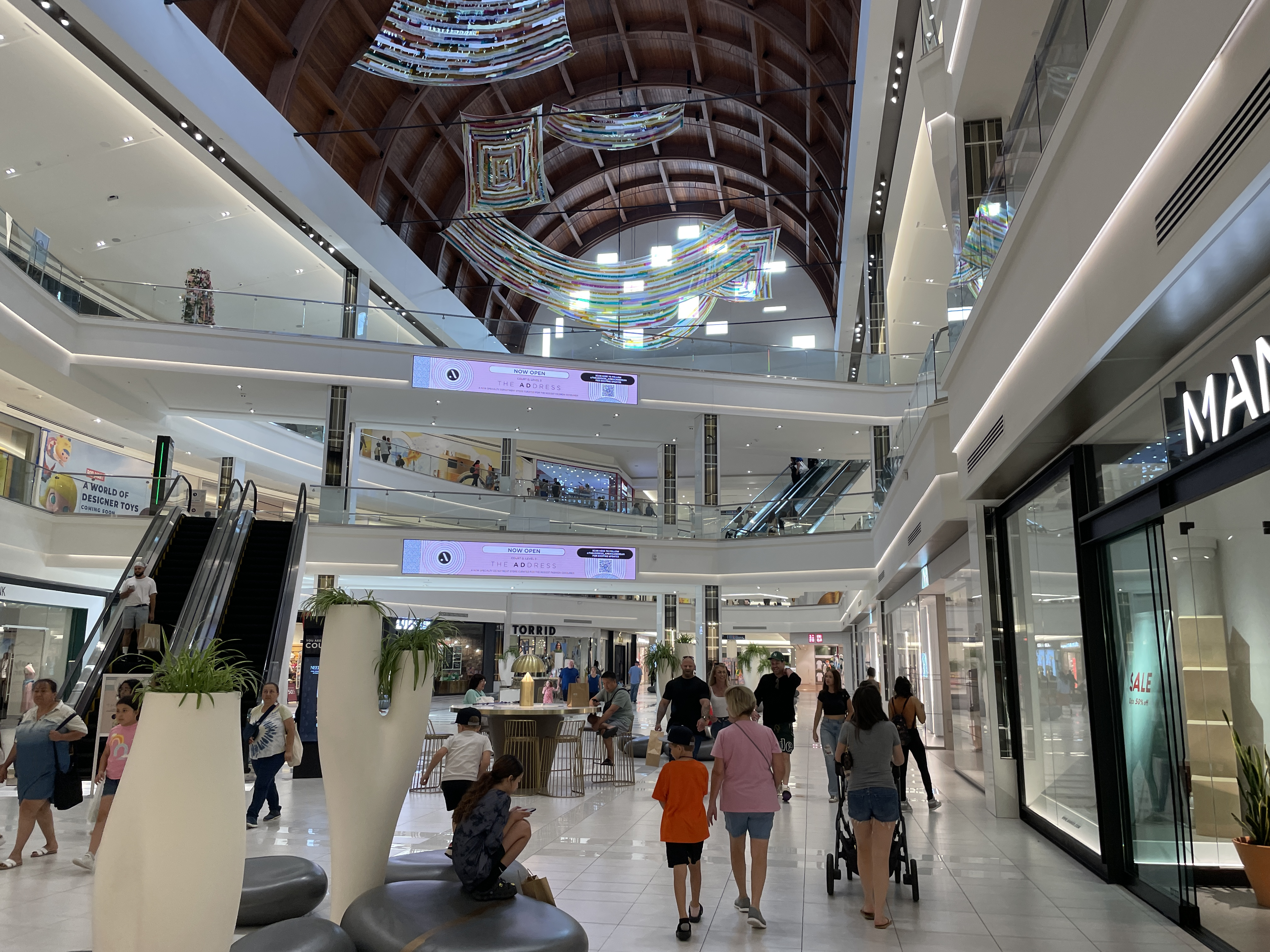
First floor (June 2023)

On October 1, 2020, American Dream officially reopened. That same day, NJ.com reported that Coca-Cola Eats, a Coca-Cola themed food court, would open later in the month, and that Munchies, a gourmet food court, would open by the end of the year. It was also announced that the luxury stores, anchored by Saks Fifth Avenue, would open in March 2021, with hotels to be added in the near future. Sea Life Aquarium and Legoland Discovery Center opened at the mall on May 29, 2021.

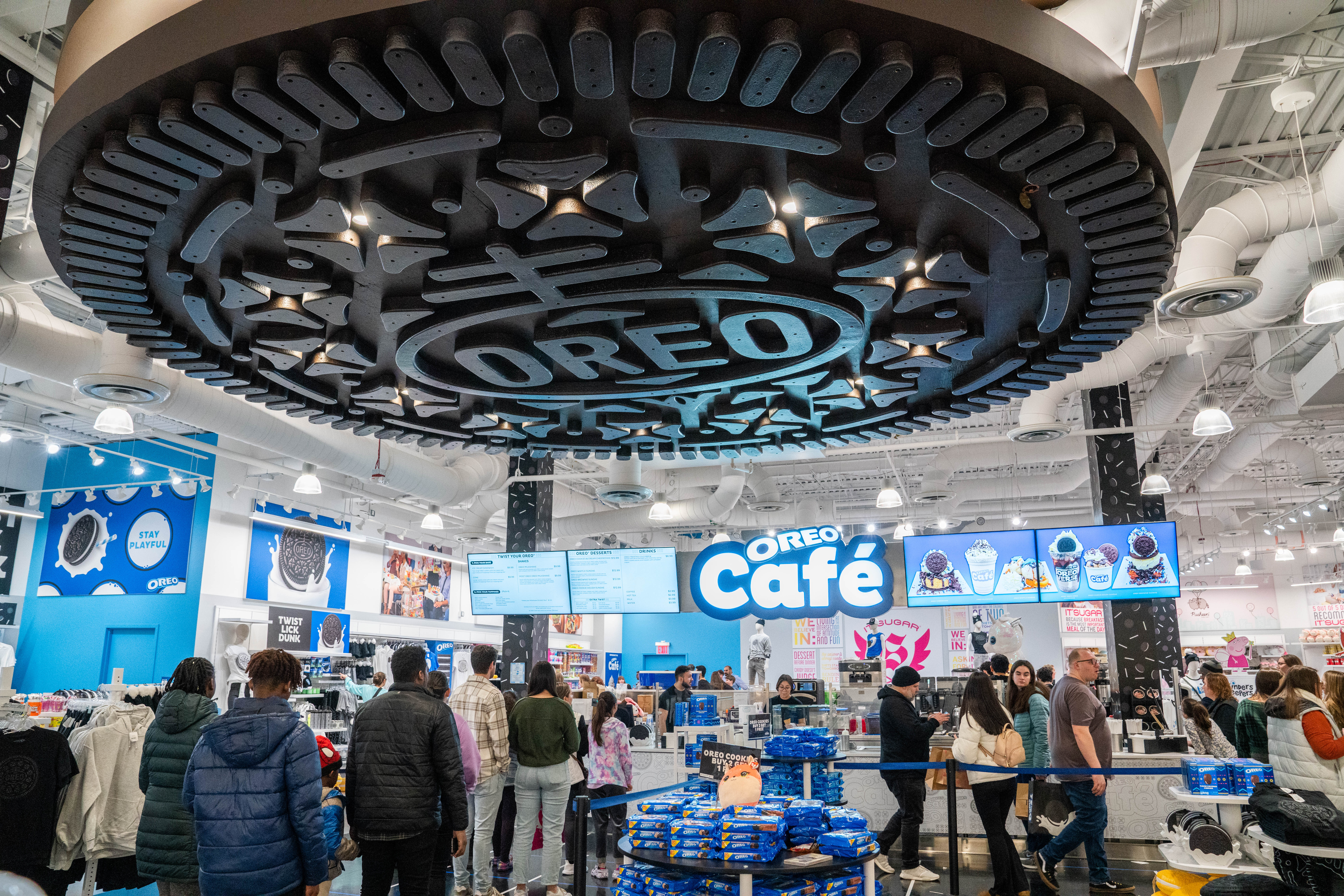
Oreo Café (January 2023)

On July 8, 2021, American Dream announced that The Avenue, the luxury wing of the complex consisting of over 20 retailers and upscale eateries and named for its anchor store, Saks Fifth Avenue, would open on September 17, 2021, as would the mall's Ferris Wheel. That August, the Oreo Café opened on the third floor of the mall's candy and novelty store IT'SUGAR. The eatery, which sells Oreo-themed desserts and beverages, was the first of its kind.

On September 14, 2021, Hasbro announced that the company would open a branded game room at American Dream called The Game Room powered by Hasbro. The venue, which is the first of its kind, would include an arcade platform with video games and interactive amusements like Skee Golf. It was scheduled to open near the Sea Life Aquarium in 2022. In the early hours of September 25, 2021, the ski slope caught fire, but no injuries were reported. In the weeks after the fire, the mall's management announced that repairs would take months to be completed.

In December 2021, NJ.com reported that Toys R Us would open a 20,000 sq ft (1,900 m^{2}), two-story global flagship store at American Dream. In light of the pandemic-related closings of its stores at Garden State Plaza in Paramus, New Jersey and The Galleria mall in Houston, Texas, this would be the company's only brick and mortar store until that company's July 2022 comeback, and would open in the middle of the month, in time for holiday shopping. In May 2022, Bloomberg News reported that the mall reported nearly $60 million in losses in 2021, a result of the COVID-19 pandemic, the fire at the Big SNOW ski slope, and delays in openings for some stores and attractions. The mall's expenses totaled $232.4 million, but its revenue reached only $173 million. In June 2022, the mall made a late payment to its bondholders of $13.9 million, but remained behind on its payments, including interest on the bond payment that its owners missed on June 1, which put them in default. This prompted East Rutherford Mayor Jeffrey Lahullier to state that same month, "The mall's definitely in trouble, there's no doubt in my mind."

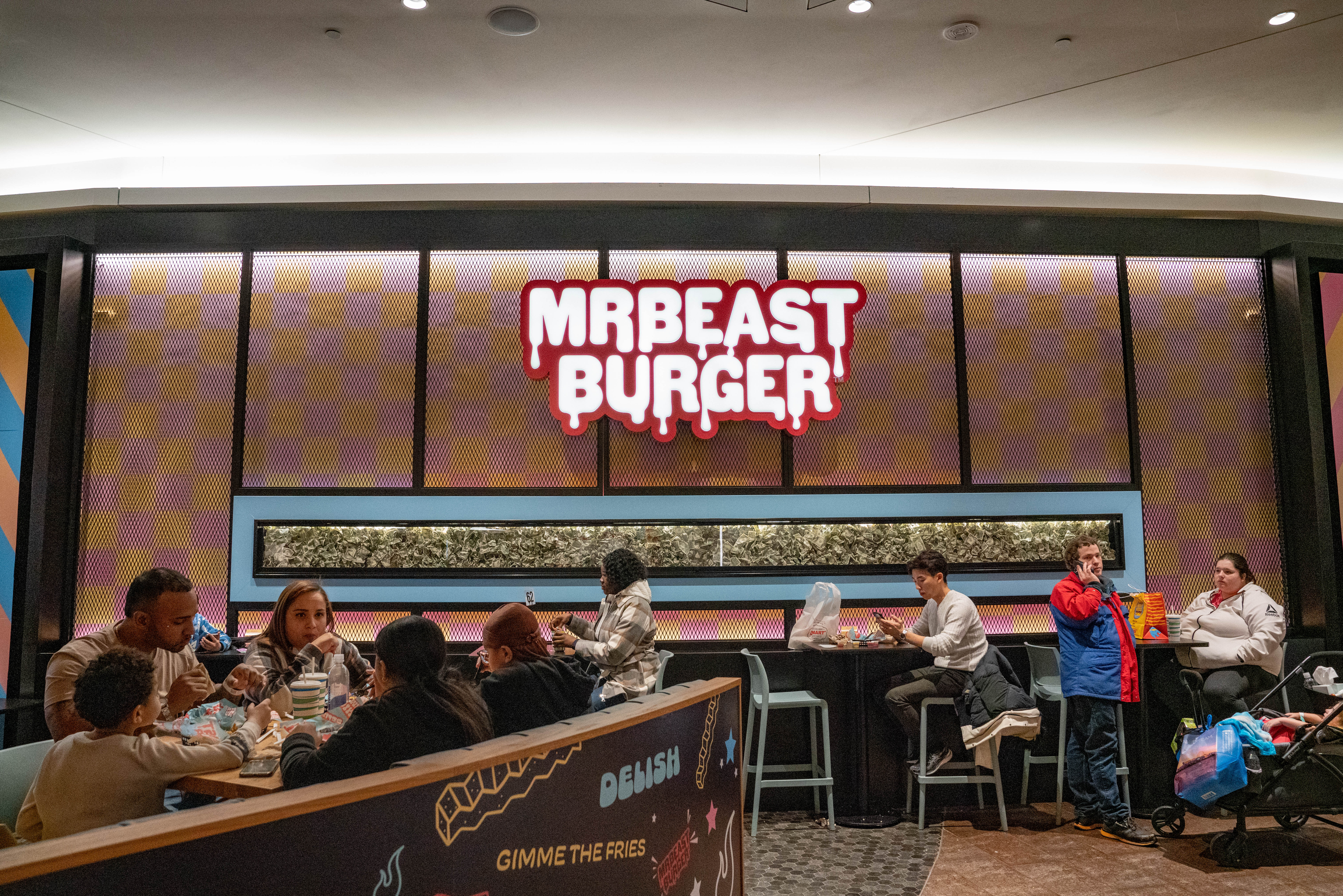
The first Mr. Beast Burger restaurant to open in the United States, as shown in January 2023

On September 4, 2022, YouTuber Jimmy Donaldson (popularly known as MrBeast) opened the first brick and mortar location of MrBeast Burger, which until then had been a delivery-only service utilizing virtual restaurants. The opening attracted thousands of fans to the mall. On October 17, 2022, LMNTS, a luxury streetwear and lifestyle retailer, opened its first East Coast store at American Dream.

On March 21, 2024, American Dream announced a partnership with Sesame Workshop to open the first ever Sesame Street Learn & Play Educational Center. The 13,000-square-foot (1,200 m^{2}) exhibit features interactive experiences and photo opportunities based on the television series. The exhibit was scheduled for a late 2024 opening. In July 2024, B&B Theatres announced that it would open a location at the mall in early 2026. The next month, American Dream paid two years of overdue interest on $287 million of municipal bonds that had been placed on the mall. By late 2024, the mall was nearly 90% leased, and the number of visitors was increasing.

After officials discovered that American Dream was operating on Sundays in violation of Bergen County's blue laws, county officials asked the New Jersey Attorney General's office to enforce the laws, and in January 2025, Paramus town officials threatened to sue the mall's operators. American Dream has since claimed that it does not have to follow the county's blue laws due to operating on state-owned land. That February, American Dream missed another required interest payment on the $287 million municipal bonds, just six months after the first "catch-up" payment. On September 6, 2025, around 80,000 fans showed up to influencer Salish Matter's event to promote her skincare brand, Sincerely Yours, causing the police to shut it down. In November 2025, it was announced that Abercrombie & Fitch, Arabian Oud, Rolife, Rowan, and ALO would open at the mall, some of which would be their only U.S. locations. The Oreo Café at American Dream closed permanently in January 2026.

On February 8, 2026, bondholders of American Dream filed a lawsuit against Triple Five Group and the Borough of East Rutherford alleging a "knowing, coordinated effort" to artificially collapse the mall's property value to reduce tax-equivalent payments. The lawsuit was filed by the U.S. Bank Trust Company, which issued $800 million in debt to help pay for the completion of the construction of the megamall. However, Triple Five responded to the lawsuit, arguing that it is a "deceptive attempt to pressure public institutions through litigation and to overturn a lawful, judicial tax appeal decision after a trial." The company also called the incident a "direct insult to the integrity of the municipality, the court and the judicial process." Triple Five asserted that the American Dream megamall will "vigorously defend itself, pursue all available remedies, and will not be intimidated by inflammatory allegations that have no basis in fact or law." On February 10, 2026, it was announced that Saks Fifth Avenue would be closing in April 2026 as part of a plan to close 8 stores nationwide as a result of parent company Saks Global filing for Chapter 11 bankruptcy. Hey I am Yogost celebrated its grand opening at American Dream on March 28, 2026.

On August 8, 2026, American Dream announced a partnership with Scott Cawthon on the twelfth anniversary of Five Nights at Freddy's to open the first ever Freddy Fazbear's Pizza restaurant with real-life animatronic mascots Freddy Fazbear, Bonnie the Bunny, Chica the Chicken, and Foxy the Pirate Fox on show stages. The restaurant is scheduled for a 2027 opening.

On August 12, 2026, the mayor of Secaucus, New Jersey announced it would sue Triple Five Group claiming that the mall owes the town and surrounding municipalities money under the terms of a Municipal Assistance Program payments intended to offset the strain on public infrastructure and services caused by the mall. As of August 2026, the mall sits on tax-exempt, state-owned land and makes payment in lieu of taxes to East Rutherford rather than property tax payments. On November 12, 2026, Paramus filed a four-count lawsuit against Triple Five, Bergen County, East Rutherford, and the New Jersey Sports and Exposition Authority over keeping the mall open on Sundays, violating blue laws.

== Transportation and parking ==
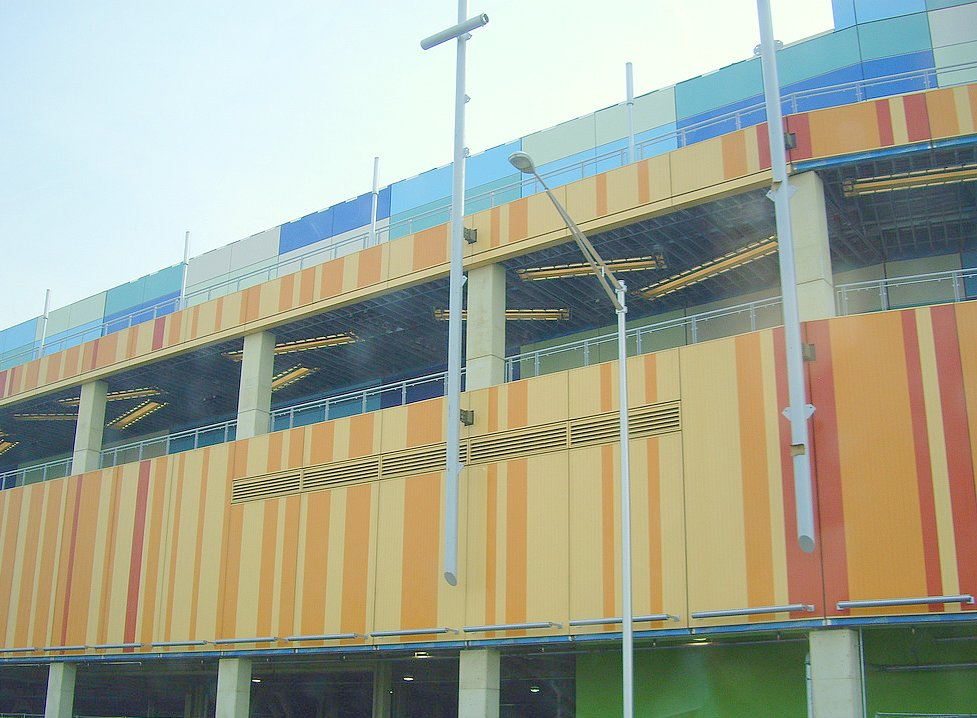
One of American Dream's (then called Meadowlands Xanadu) unfinished parking garages in March 2009

=== Public transport ===
Public transportation to American Dream's on-site bus hub and train station is provided by NJ Transit. Direct local and express bus service to American Dream includes the following NJ Transit Bus lines:

- 85: Hoboken/Union City – American Dream
- 355 Express: Port Authority Bus Terminal – American Dream
- 356: Secaucus Junction – American Dream
- 703: Paterson/Passaic – American Dream
- 772: Hackensack – American Dream

For travel by rail, the Meadowlands station is the western terminus for the Meadowlands Rail Line, located at the Meadowlands Sports Complex next to American Dream. However, that line is not being operated daily for American Dream, but solely during events at the stadium. NJ Transit stated that daily rail service could be added "once the rail system is resilient enough that doing so won't adversely affect NJ Transit commuters".

Multi-modal service is provided by NY Waterway, which provides a package service consisting of ferry service from Manhattan to Weehawken Port Imperial in Weehawken, followed by a bus for the remaining 6.5 miles to the mall. Passengers can also take the bus without a ferry connection.

=== Private transport ===
Motorists traveling to the location are accommodated with a 33,000-space parking lot. American Dream initially announced plans to charge for daily parking, but changed this, charging patrons only when events were held at MetLife Stadium. By August 2021, this was amended again to make parking free for the first hour, after which motorists would be charged $3.00 USD. As of 2026, parking is free for the first 15 minutes and costs $5.00 for any additional time.

A helipad on the roof of the mall's Saks Fifth Avenue store was one of three located on the property by the time it opened that October. That month, NorthJersey.com reported the mall had purchased three helicopters in May, plus four automobiles—two Rolls-Royces and two Bentleys—to transport customers from Manhattan and the Hamptons. American Dream would also employ a Rolls-Royce golf cart to move VIP guests throughout the property. The amenity made American Dream one of the region's first retail centers to offer such an accommodation to shoppers wishing to avoid traffic.

== Amenities ==
As of 2019, American Dream consists of 70% entertainment facilities and 30% retail locations.

=== General ===
- Six distinctive grand atria flooded with natural light. One includes an extensive garden with bird-filled aviaries and rabbit fields. Another was designated as an entertainment hub.
- Albero dei Sogni/Secret Garden – a tree-like sculpture consisting of more than 75,000 LED lights and 25,000 leaves that play music during intervals several times a day
- A 60-foot fashion fountain that can be converted into a catwalk in seconds
- Interactive museums featuring extravagant props and backdrops
- Instagram moments – areas designed specifically for social media photography
- Museum-scale interiors displaying artwork by local and international artists

=== Shopping ===
- 450 retail shops (at peak)
- Six anchor retail tenants (at peak) with more than 50,000 square feet (4,600 m^{2}) each
- 12 major retailers (at peak) (20,000 to 50,000 square feet [1,900 to 4,600 m^{2}] each)
- 339 smaller shops (up to 20,000 square feet [1,900 m^{2}])
- A 35,000-square-foot (3,300 m^{2}) H Mart Asian-American supermarket
- A 20,000-square-foot (1,900 m^{2}), two-story Toys "R" Us flagship store

=== Dining ===
- Over 100 eateries (at peak)
- 21 full-service restaurants (at peak)
- 45 specialty food retailers (at peak)
- A 38,000-square-foot (3,500 m^{2}), 18-vendor, Munchies-themed food hall, which includes a kosher food court

=== Entertainment ===
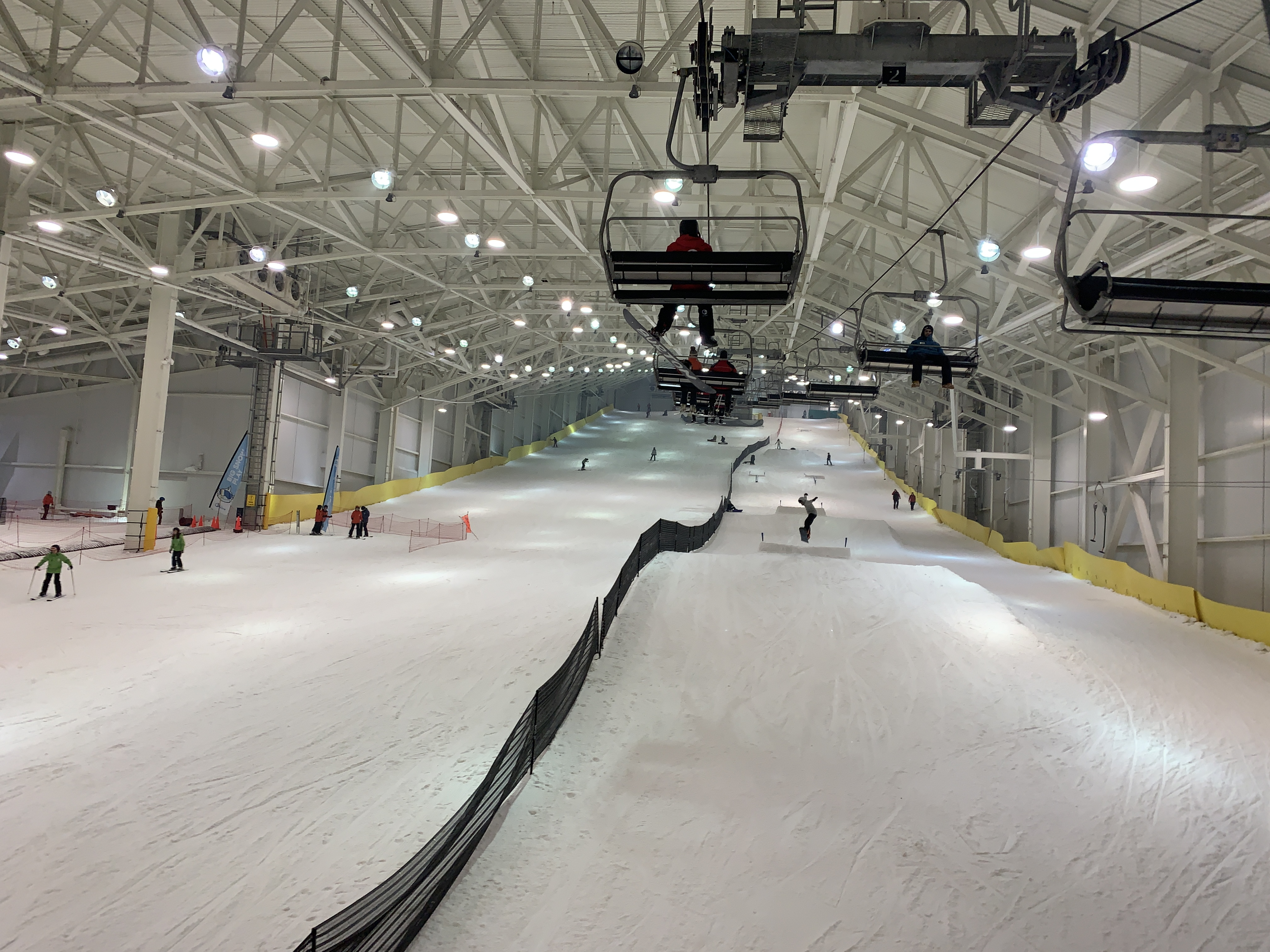
The "Switchback" and "Northern Lights" trails at Big Snow American Dream (February 2020)

- The Rink @ The Arena - an Indoor NHL-sized ice rink, convertible to surfaces for sports like roller hockey, basketball, arena football, boxing matches as well as concerts and other events.
- Nickelodeon Universe American Dream – an indoor theme park
- DreamWorks Water Park – a year-round indoor water park
- Big Snow American Dream – an indoor ski slope
- Two miniature 18-hole golf courses (with one themed to Angry Birds)
- B&B Theatres Movie Theater and Bowling Alley
- Legoland Discovery Center
- Sea Life Aquarium
- Hapik indoor rock climbing facility
- Mirror Maze attraction
- The Game Room powered by Hasbro
- Jump, a virtual reality cliff jumping attraction
- Ninja Kidz, a trampoline park
- An Escape Room complex with six puzzle rooms by The Escape Game
- Sesame Street Learn & Play - An attraction themed off of Sesame Street
- Topgolf Swing Suite
- Dream Live Performing Arts Center
- Go Kart facility
- Freddy Fazbear's Pizza - A Five Nights at Freddy's-themed restaurant (projected to open in 2027)

==== Dream Wheel ====
Announced in February 2008, PepsiCo agreed to pay $100 million for a ten-year sponsorship of Pepsi Globe, a London Eye-style ferris wheel built facing the New Jersey Turnpike that would measure 287 ft (87 m), and feature 26 glass enclosed, climate controlled gondolas that would take 20 people on 25-minute rides. Its planned opening was in 2009. It would be the largest Ferris wheel in America, but it drew much criticism from local residents and politicians who viewed it as an eyesore, and who voiced concerns about both safety and its obstruction of views of Manhattan's skyline across the Hudson River, which they feared would hurt property values and damage the image of the local communities. PepsiCo eventually withdrew their sponsorship of the ferris wheel, which would no longer be branded with that company's name or logo. By 2015, the ferris wheel was still being planned, but had been rechristened the Observation Wheel, and would be only 235 ft (72 m) in diameter, though it would retain the same number of gondolas. The wheel was again renamed The Dream Wheel by the time it opened on April 13, 2022.

== Photo gallery ==
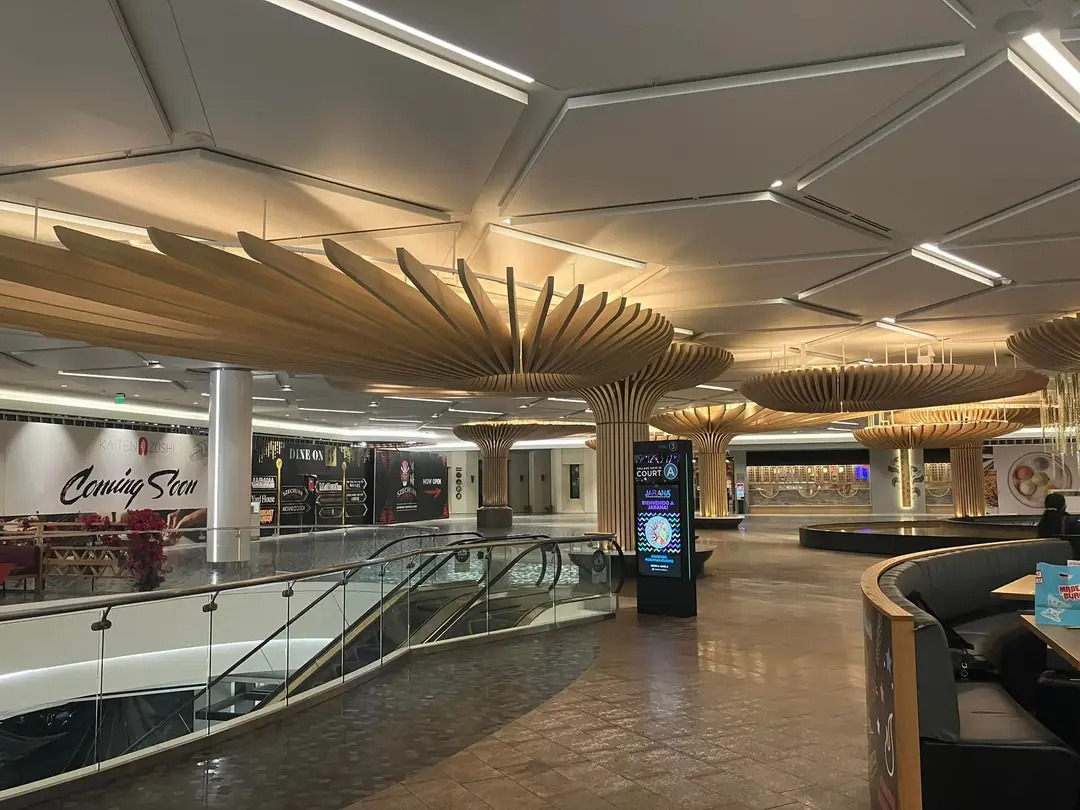
Third floor (February 2026)

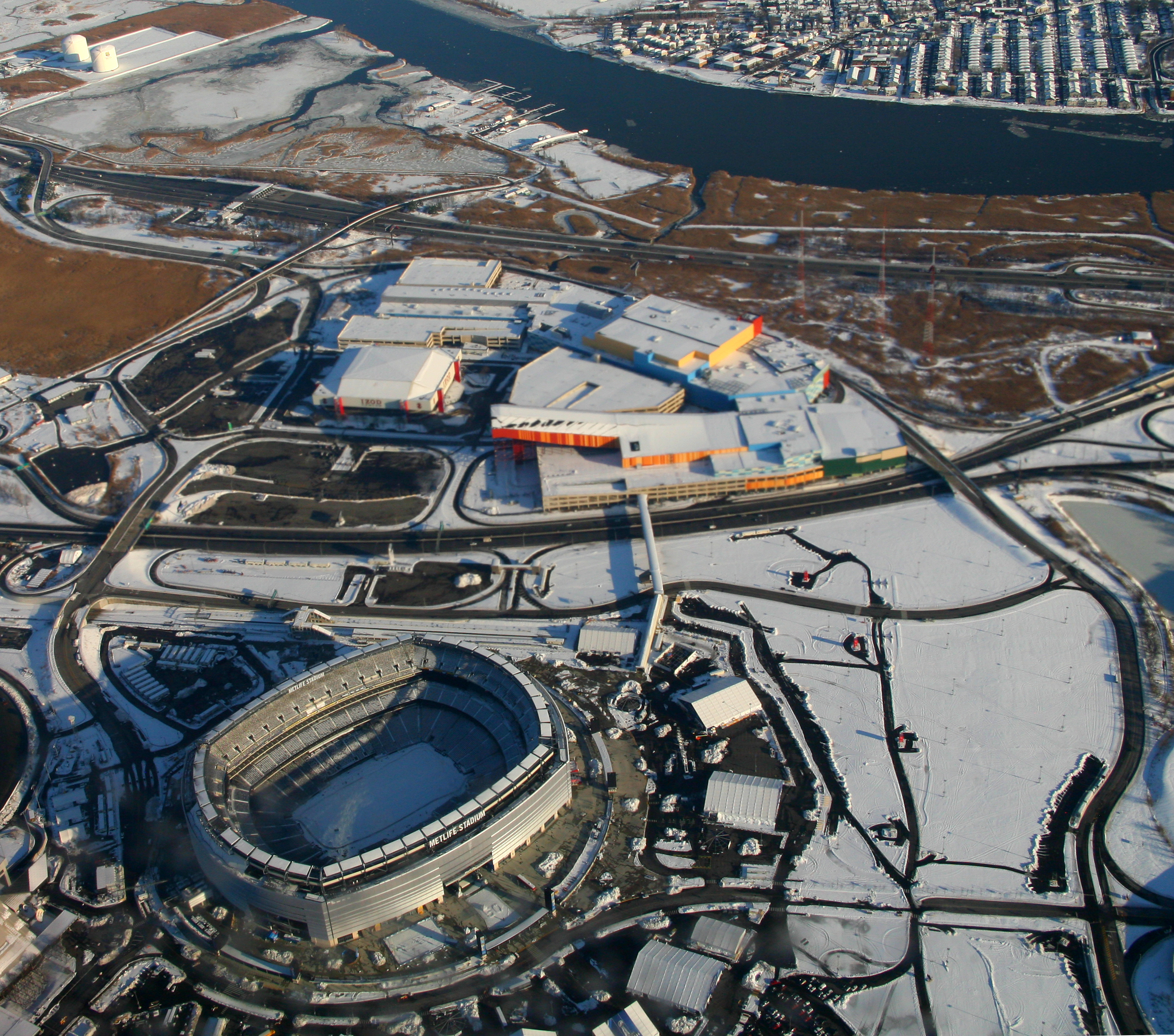
Aerial photo of the unfinished American Dream complex and MetLife Stadium (February 2014)

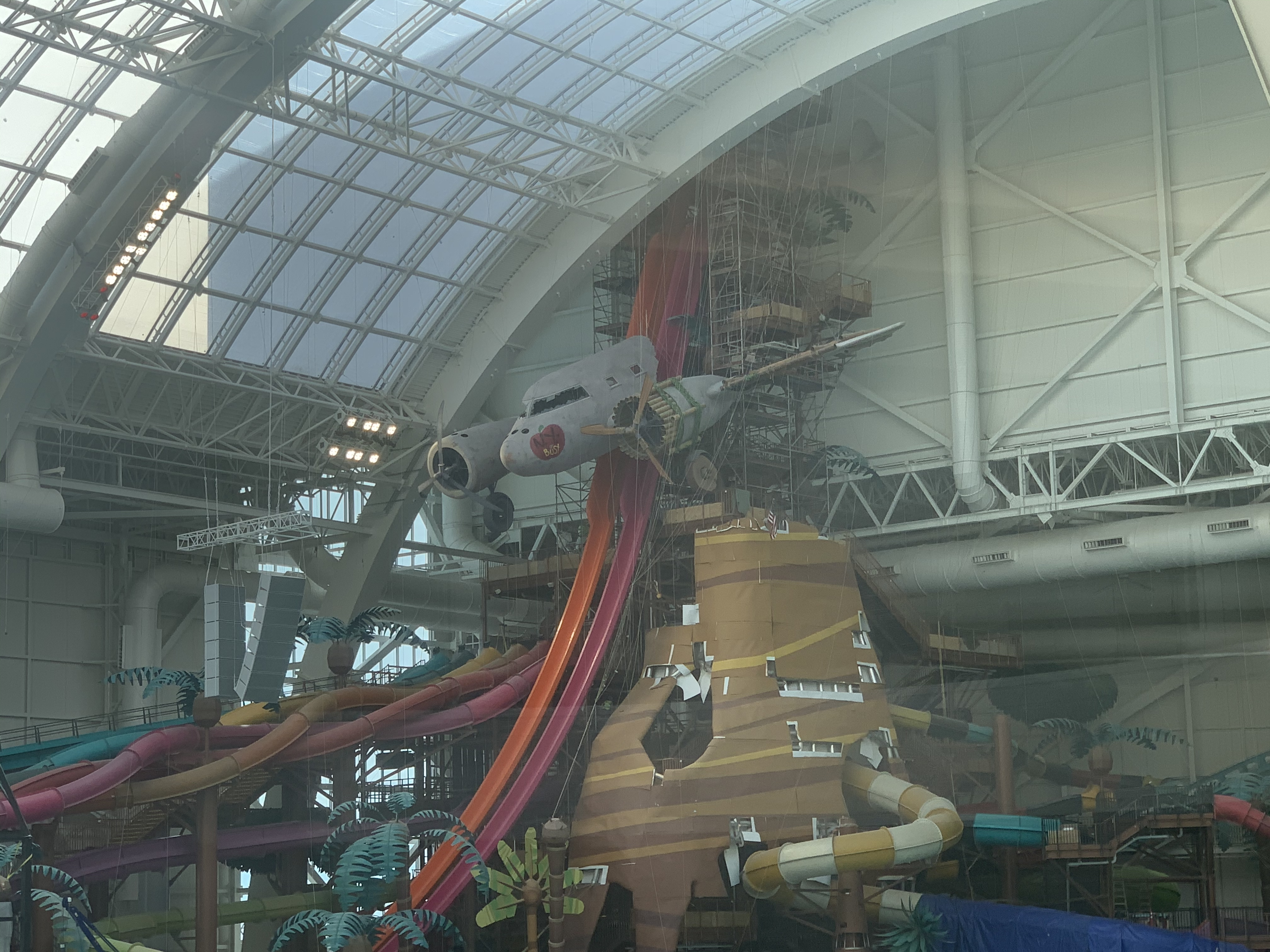
DreamWorks Water Park, as viewed when it was under construction (October 2019)

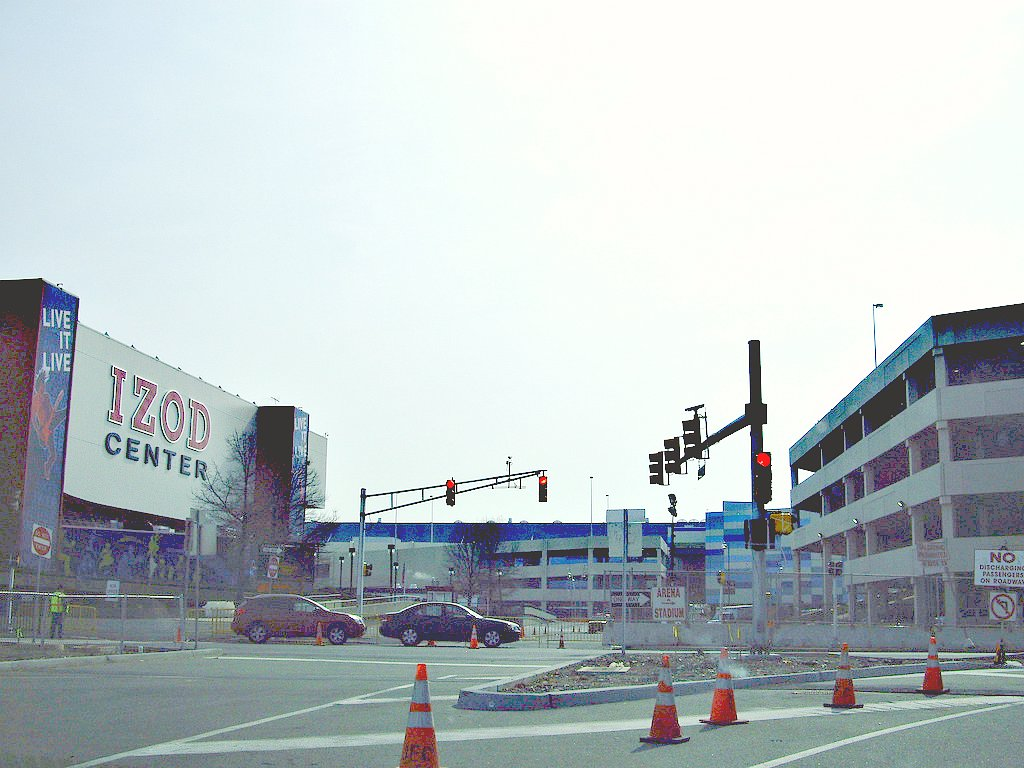
Street view (April 2009)

== See also ==
- Patriot Place
- Titletown District
- List of largest shopping malls in the world
- List of largest shopping malls in the United States
- Downtown Summerlin (shopping center), another shopping mall that was stalled and changed developers multiple times
- Laval Mills, another Landmark Mills mall that was never developed
- Pittsburgh Mills, another successor mall that replaced a previous stalled one (Frazer Heights Galleria)
