= Big Snow American Dream =

Ski and snowboarding park in New Jersey

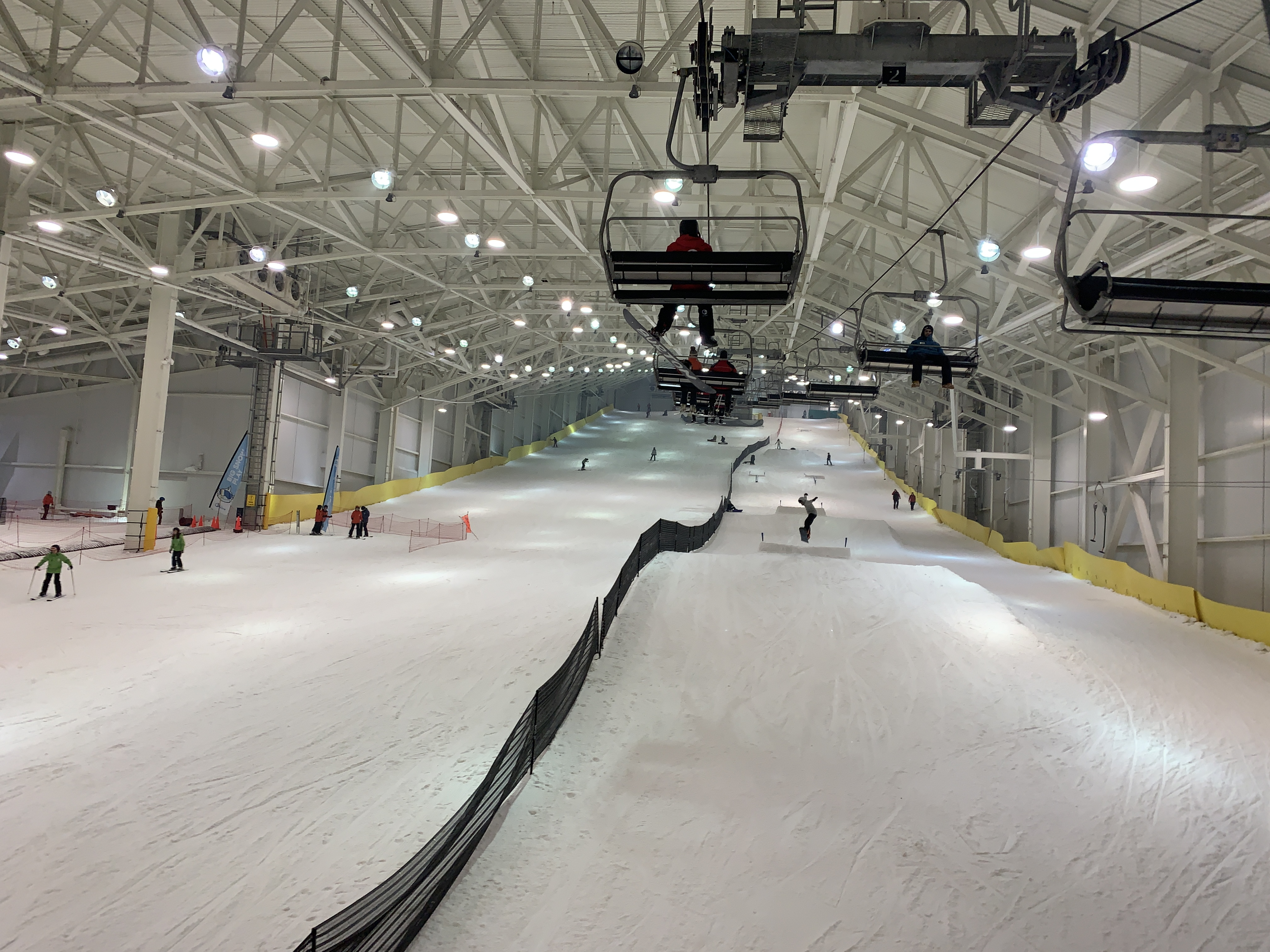
- The "Switchback" and "Northern Lights" trails at Big Snow American Dream
- Interactive map of Big Snow American Dream
- Location: Meadowlands Sports Complex, East Rutherford, New Jersey
- Nearest city: New York City
- Coordinates: 40°48′40″N 74°04′12″W
- Status: Operational
- Owner: Snow Operating
- Skiable area: 4 acres (1.6 ha)
- Trails: 3
- Longest run: Switchback – 1,000 feet (300 m)
- Lift system: 4 total (1 quad lift, 1 Poma, 2 magic carpets)
- Terrain parks: Yes
- Snowmaking: Yes
- Website: bigsnowamericandream.com

Big Snow American Dream is an indoor skiing and snowboarding park within the American Dream shopping and entertainment complex, at the Meadowlands Sports Complex in East Rutherford, New Jersey, that opened on December 5, 2019.

Big Snow American Dream is the first indoor ski park in North America. It is owned by the Triple Five Group and is operated by Snow Operating who also run Mountain Creek Resort.

== History ==
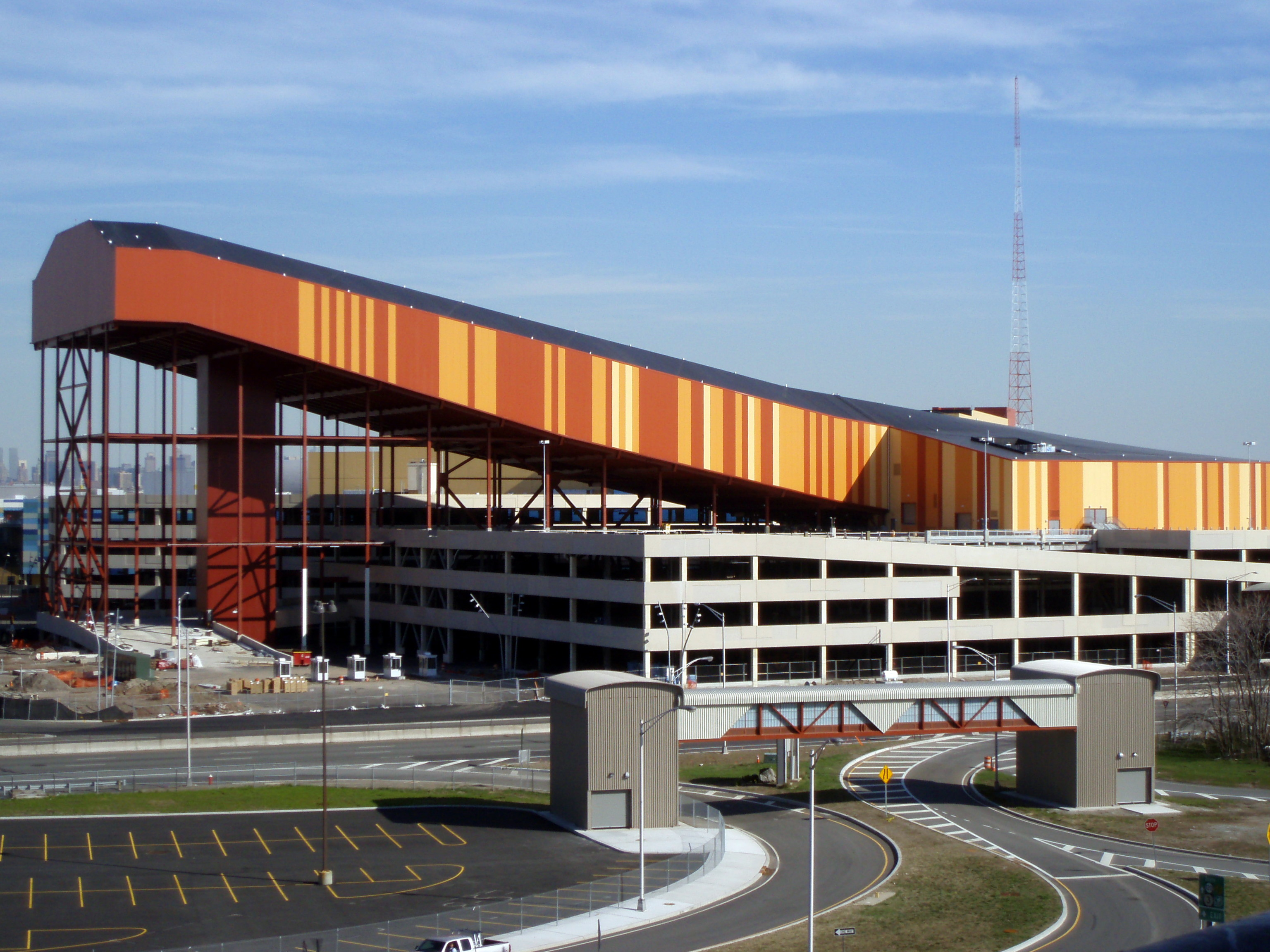
The exterior of the indoor ski slope in 2009

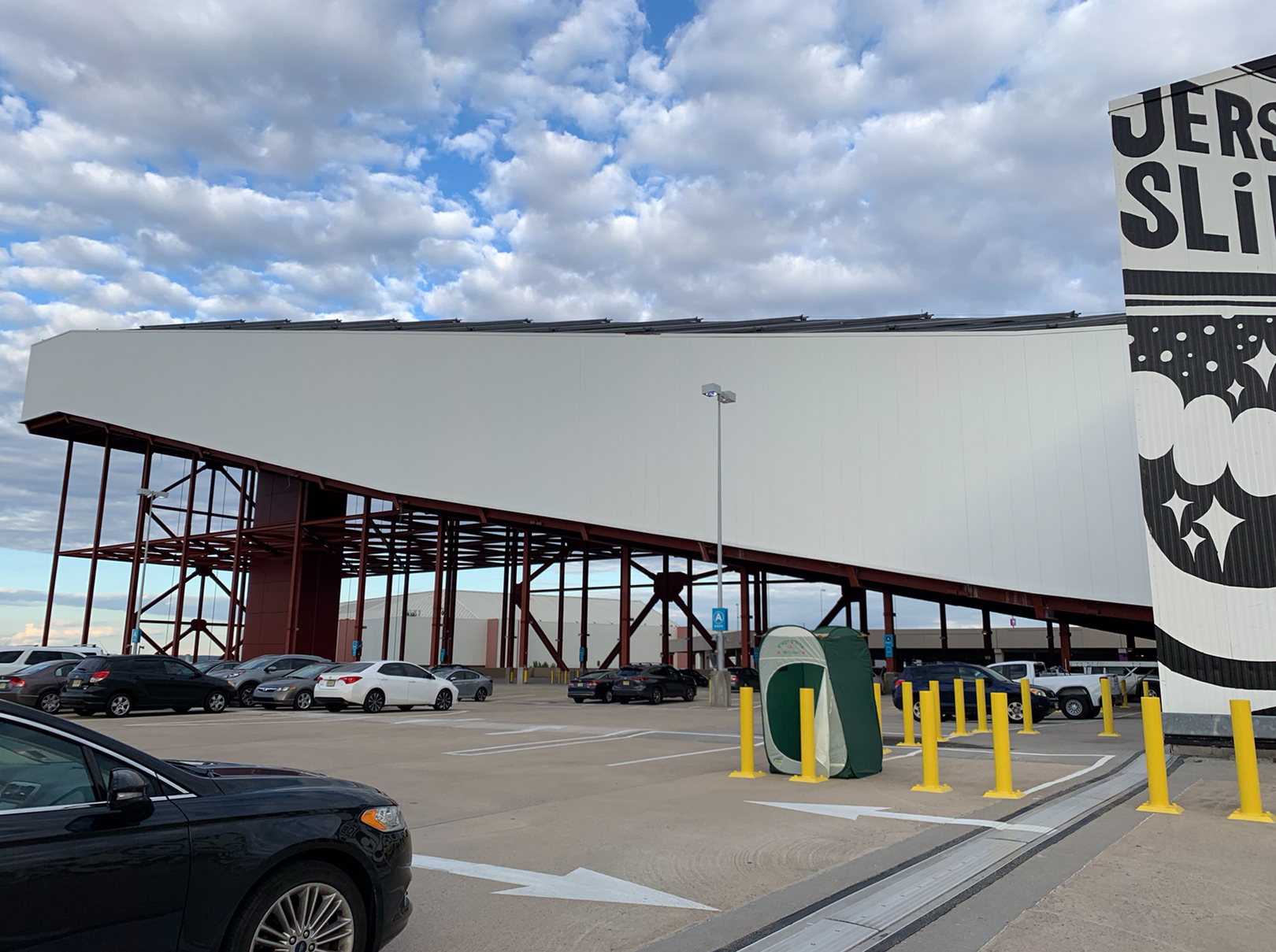
Partial view of the ski slope's exterior in 2020

The American Dream shopping mall was first proposed as Meadowlands Mills in 1994. The mall, later renamed Meadowlands Xanadu, was nearly complete in 2009 when construction stopped due to a lack of funding. The original plans for the mall had included an indoor ski slope, which was advertised as the United States' first indoor Alpine ski resort. On February 1, 2011, following a month of heavy snowfall, observers found that 50 to 60 feet (15 to 18 m) of the slope's eastern wall had been damaged, and a horizontal crease had formed on the wall. Two days later, as workers tried to melt the snow on the ski slope's roof, about 150 feet (50 m) of the eastern wall had collapsed under the weight of the snowfall accumulation.

In May 2011, the New Jersey Sports and Exposition Authority formalized an agreement with Triple Five Group, which assumed ownership of the mall and renamed it "American Dream". The ski slope would continue to be built as part of the agreement. The ski slope was rebranded "Big Snow" in 2015.

In 2018, Triple Five announced that the ski slope would open the following December as part of the mall's phased opening, which would take place between 2019 and 2020. In advance of the opening, Big Snow hired 300 workers. On December 5, 2019, Big Snow American Dream opened with an event attended by skiers and snowboarders such as Donna Weinbrecht, Lindsey Vonn, Red Gerard, and Ben Ferguson. The opening of a portion of Big Snow was delayed until the following week.

In the early hours of September 25, 2021, the ski slope caught fire, but no injuries were reported. The fire was caused by an electrical issue. In the weeks after the fire, the mall's management announced that repairs would take months to be completed. Big Snow reopened on May 27, 2022, eight months after the incident.

== Attractions ==
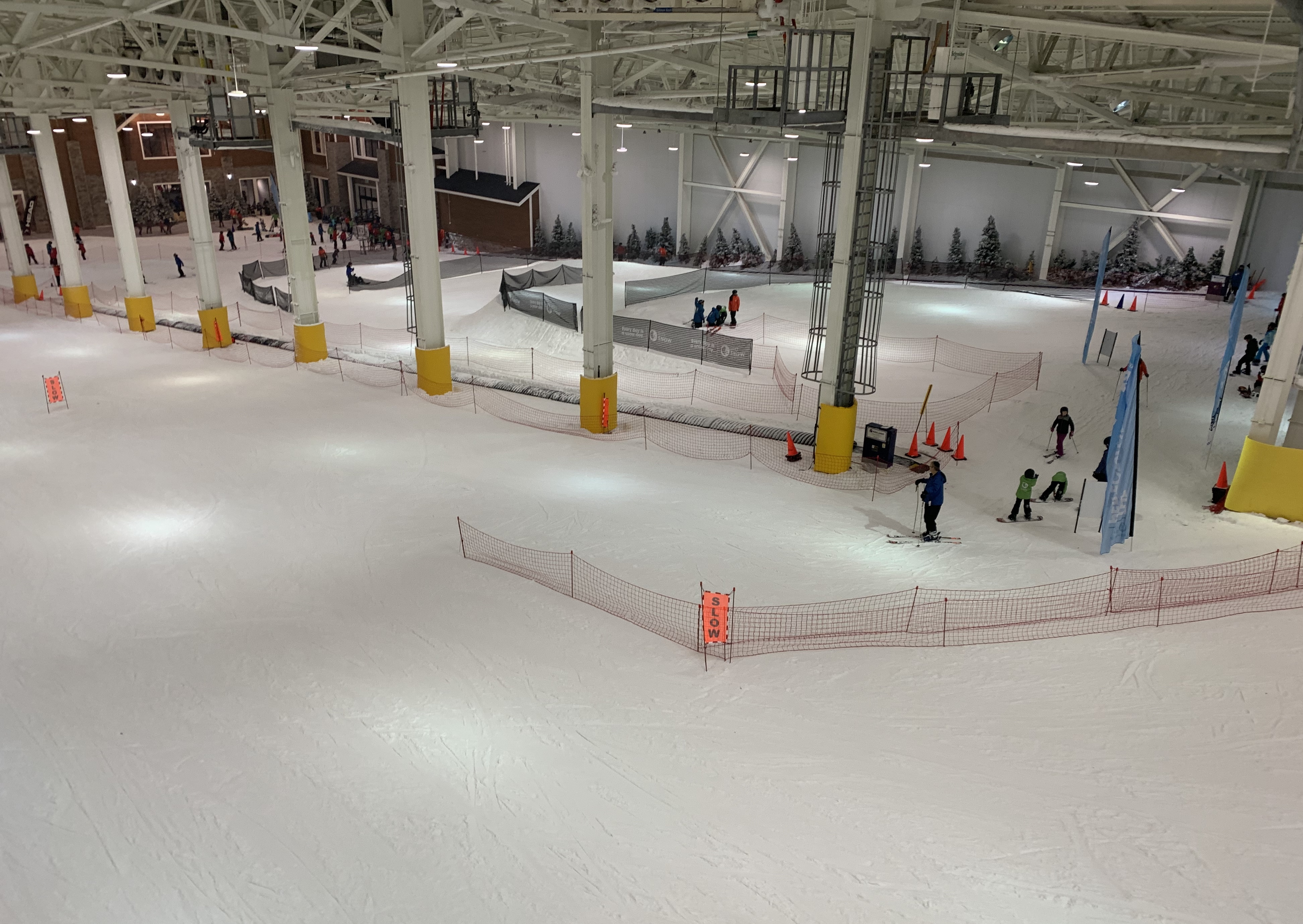
The "Lil' Dipper" beginner trail

The 4-acre (1.6 ha) park is covered with 5,500 tons of snow, packed to a depth of 2 feet (0.61 m) and is open year-round. There are three trails: a beginner trail called "Lil' Dipper", an intermediate trail called "Switchback", and an advanced trail called "Northern Lights". There is also a terrain park. The trails are served by four lifts: two carpet lifts serving the Lil Dipper, and a quad chairlift and platter surface lift serving Northern Lights and Switchback. Both lifts were manufactured by Doppelmayr-CTEC in 2008. The slopes are 1,000 feet (300 m) long, covering an altitude of 160 feet (49 m) with a maximum pitch of 26%.

Its climate-controlled environment is at a consistent 28 °F (−2 °C). Guests are able to get skiing and snowboarding lessons. To prevent overcrowding, guests book tickets for time slots in advance.

The park also has a gourmet hot chocolate shop called Joe C's Hot Cocoa.

== See also ==
- DreamWorks Water Park
- Nickelodeon Universe
