= Arabian Oud =

Saudi Arabian fragrance brand

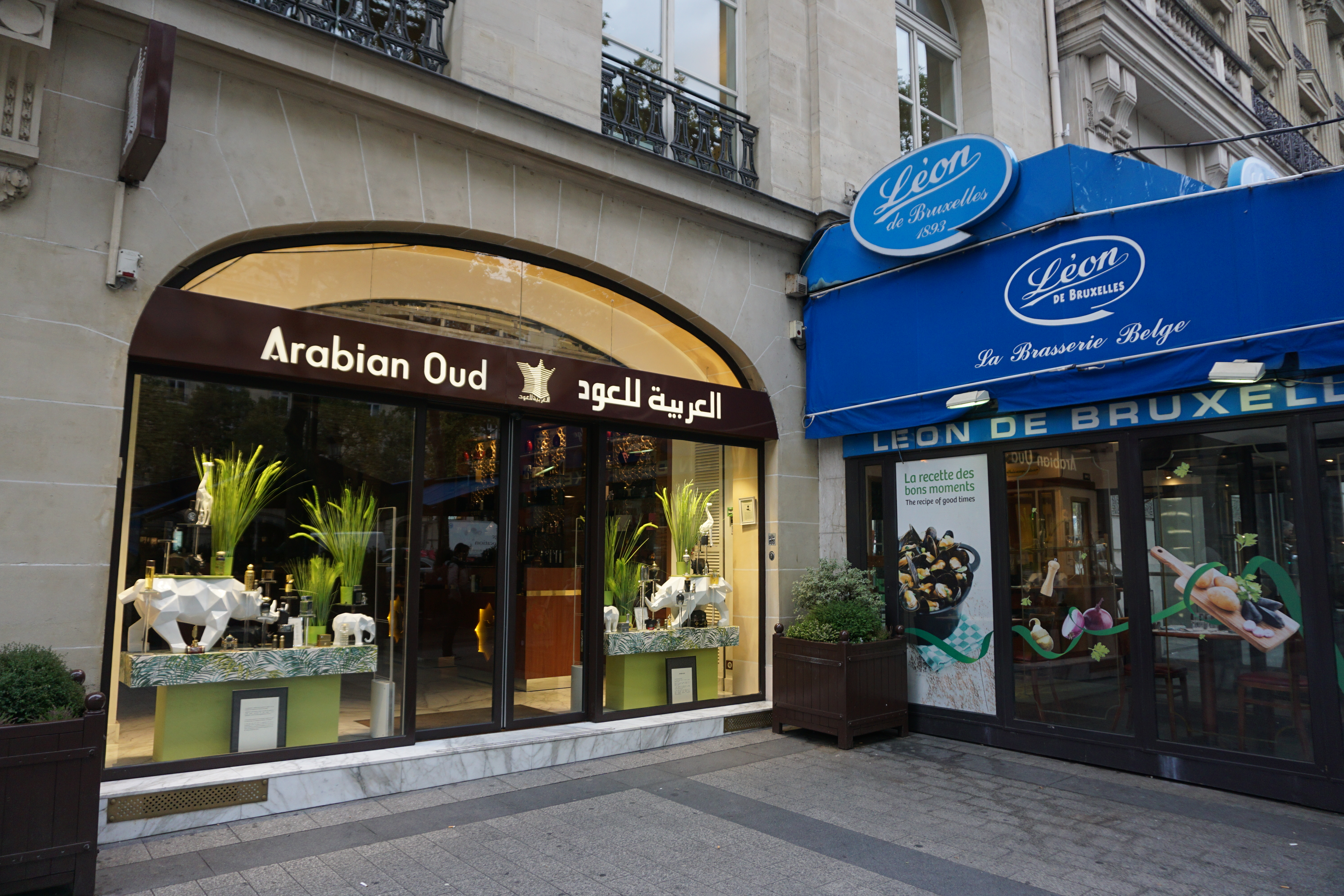
Arabian Oud, Avenue des Champs-Élysées, Paris in 2017

Arabian Oud is a Saudi Arabian fragrance brand and retail store chain.

Arabian Oud (Arabic: العربية للعود) started in 1982 in Riyadh, Saudi Arabia, and has over 1200 stores in 37 countries. The company has over 3,700 employees.
