= Robotime Technology =

Chinese toy company

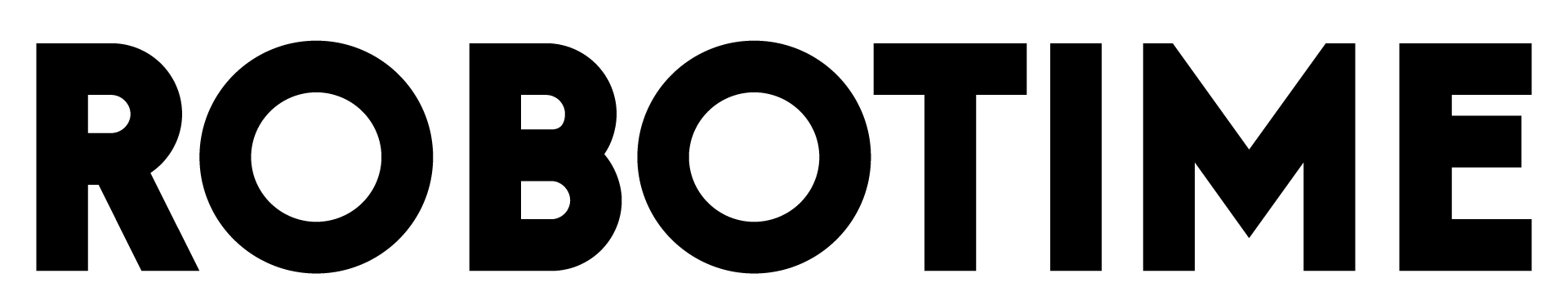
- Industry: Toys
- Founded: October 2007
- Headquarters: China
- Area served: Worldwide
- Products: 3D wooden puzzles; Miniature houses; Toys
- Website: www.robotimeonline.com

Robotime Technology is a Chinese toy company that produces toys, 3D wooden puzzles and miniature houses. Founded in October 2007, it has four sub-brands: Rolife, ROKR, Rowood and Robud producing art, technological, engineering, mechanical and educational puzzles for family and institutional use.

== History and products ==
Robotime Technology was established in October 2007 and owns intellectual property rights in China. Robotime operates four sub-brands including Rolife, ROKR, Rowood and Robud with diversified products in engineering, art, mechanical, technology and educational DIY puzzles and toys. Rolife is focused on designing DIY products for both children and adults.

ROKR uses a combination of engineering, science, technology, art and mathematics to design and create mechanical-driven 3D construction kits and models with precise structures and hardcore shapes when assembled. Rowood creates wooden puzzles with colored wooden pieces while Robud is specialized in wooden toys for kids.
