= It'Sugar =

American candy store chain

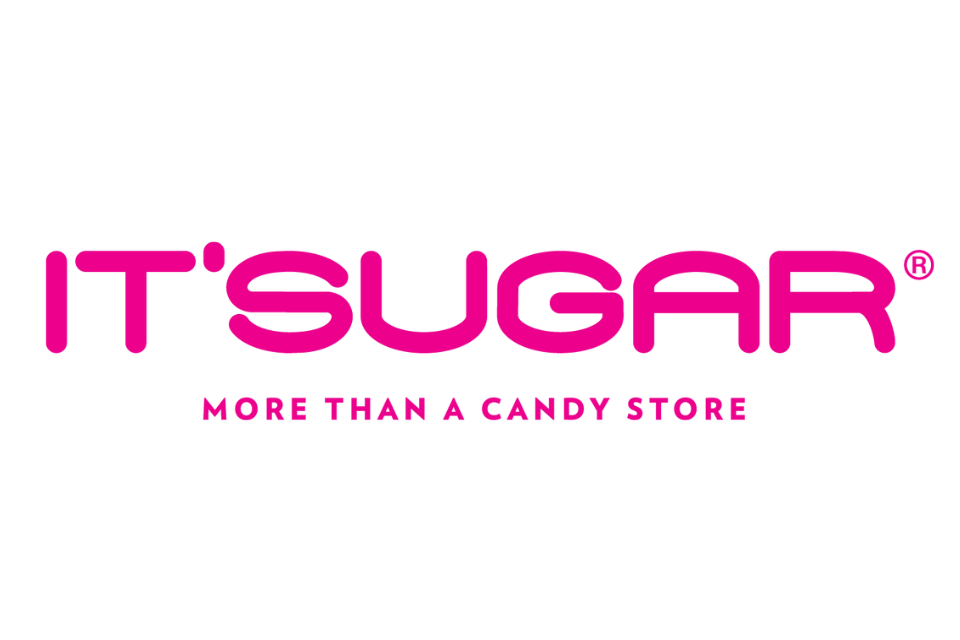
- Logo used since 2006
- Type: Privately held company
- Industry: Confectionary
- Founded: 2006
- Founder: Jeff Rubin
- Headquarters: Fort Lauderdale, Florida, US
- Number of locations: 116
- Area served: United States, Canada
- Parent: BBX Capital Corporation
- Website: itsugar.com

It'Sugar (stylized as IT'SUGAR and pronounced "it's sugar") is an American candy store chain. It has over 100 locations in the United States and Canada, mostly located in shopping malls and tourist areas.

== History ==
Jeff Rubin worked on Wall Street before returning home to the Midwest to help his family business in 1994.

Rubin founded his store and opened its first location in Atlantic City, New Jersey, in 2005. His inspiration came from FAO Schwarz and Toys "R" Us stores. He included novelty items when the stores and brand expanded across the country. They adopted the "Absolutely No Nutritional Value" slogan and included large items in stock.

In 2017, BBX Capital bought his brand for $57 million.

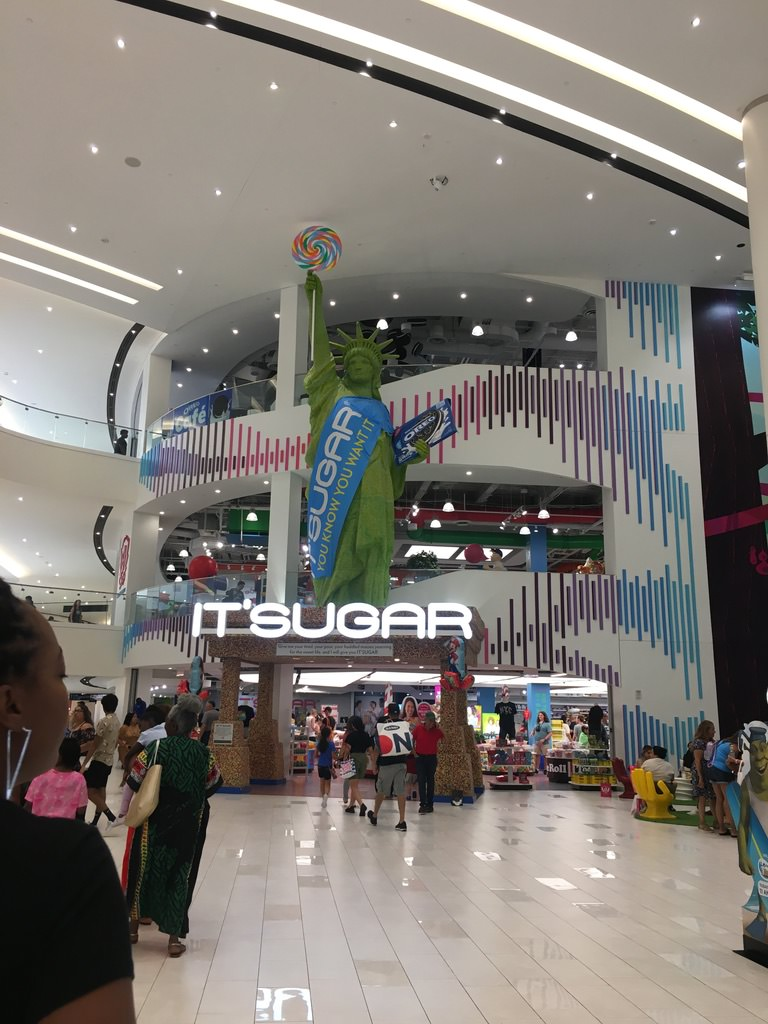
It'Sugar location in American Dream Meadowlands

In 2019, It'Sugar opened its largest store at American Dream in East Rutherford, New Jersey. The store is three stories tall and has more than 10,000 types of candy, as well as having a candy replica of the Statue of Liberty made from 1.5 million jellybeans.

In 2020, the company filed for Chapter 11 bankruptcy due to multiple factors including lack of ingredients from its providers and brands featured, low sales, and the COVID-19 pandemic, but they shortly emerged.

In 2022, another location was opened on April 7, 2022 on Magnificent Mile in downtown Chicago, Illinois replacing the Disney Store flagship location which is now closed on September 15, 2021 which is 2,000 square feet. Also, a two-story, 20,335 square foot building in Times Square, the second largest in the United States, opened in August 11, 2022. Later the first Canada location was opened, as a "candy department store" in the West Edmonton Mall.

In 2023, they opened locations in Bellis Fair, The Centre at Salisbury, and another in Miami in 2024.

== Partnerships ==
With the company's largest location in the American Dream, It'Sugar partnered with Mondelez International to open an in-store café on the third floor, named Oreo TWISTiD.
