= DreamWorks Water Park =

Water park in East Rutherford, New Jersey

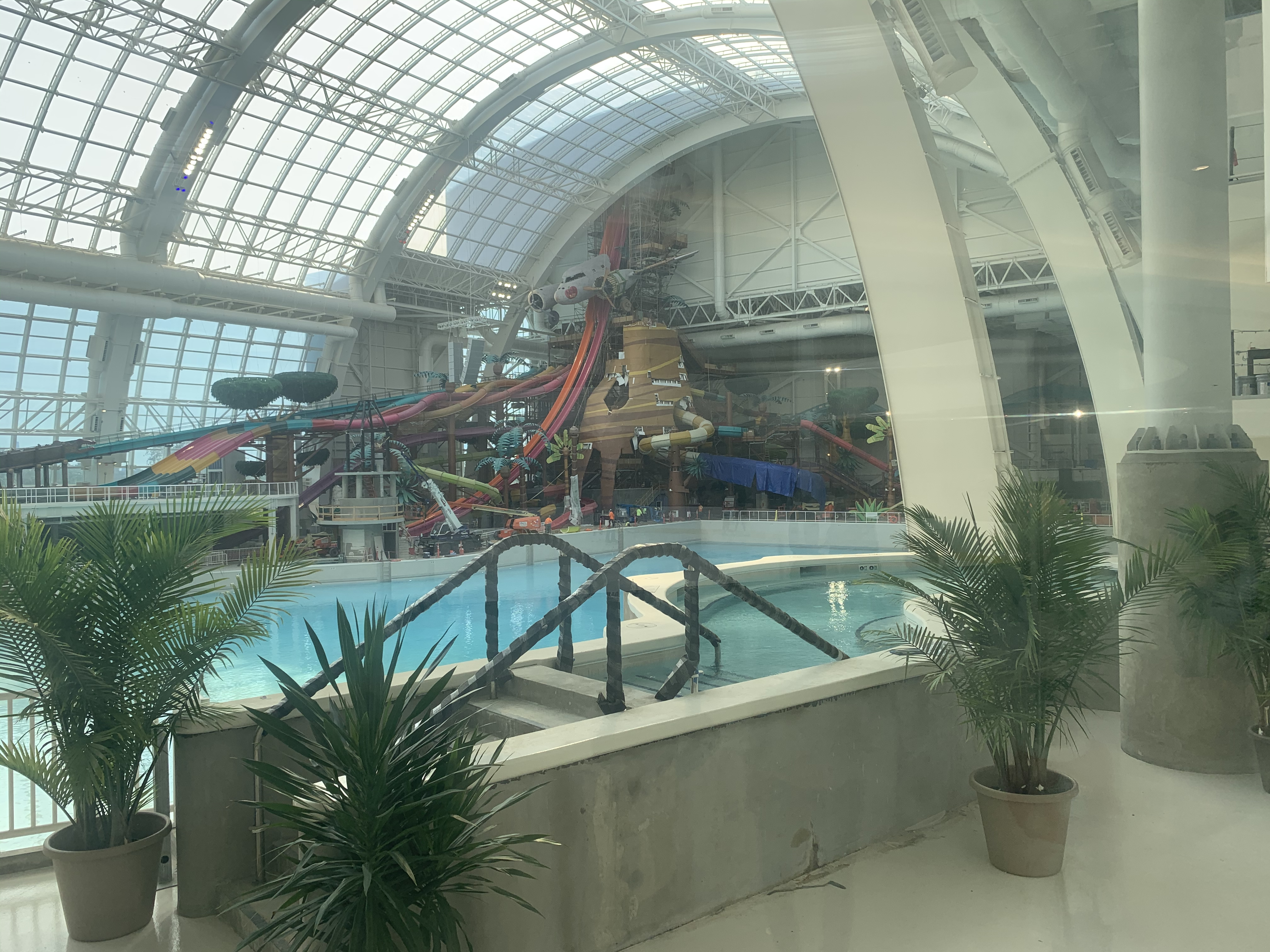
- Interactive map of DreamWorks Water Park
- Location: American Dream Meadowlands
- Coordinates: 40.807101°N 74.069175°W
- Theme: DreamWorks Animation
- Owner: Triple Five Group (under license from NBCUniversal)
- General manager: Marena Thompson
- Opened: October 1, 2020
- Operating season: Year-round
- Pools: A single pool
- Water slides: 15 water slides
- Website: americandream.com/venue/dreamworks-water-park

DreamWorks Water Park is an indoor water park within the American Dream shopping and entertainment complex, at the Meadowlands Sports Complex in East Rutherford, New Jersey, United States. Opened on October 1, 2020, the water park includes 15 water slides and 15 attractions, and covers 8.5 acres (3.4 ha).

== History ==
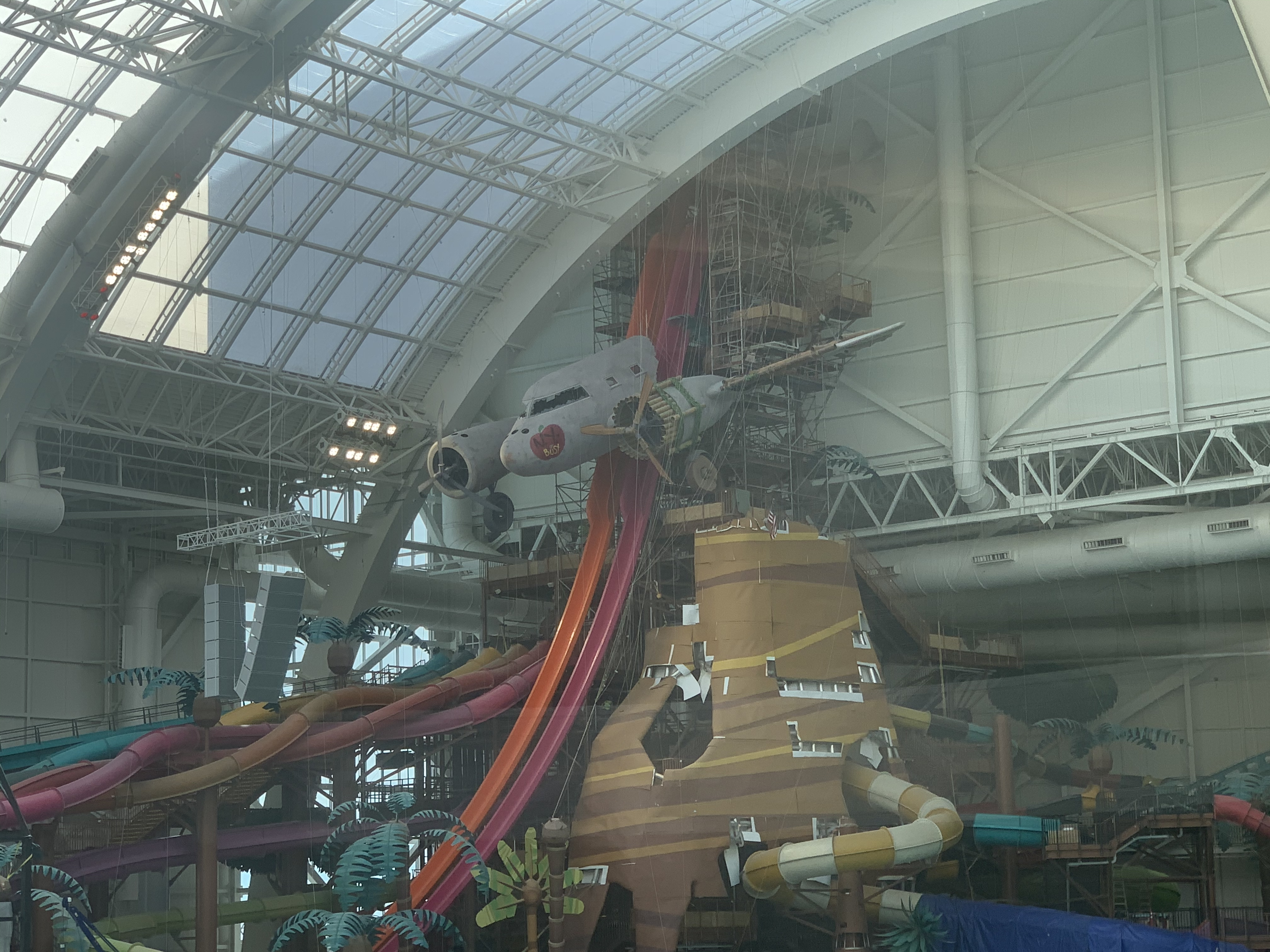
Under construction, 2019

The American Dream shopping mall was first proposed as Meadowlands Mills in 1994. The mall, later renamed Meadowlands Xanadu, was nearly complete in 2009 when construction stopped due to a lack of funding. In 2011, the New Jersey Sports and Exposition Authority formalized an agreement with Triple Five Group, which assumed ownership of the mall and renamed it "American Dream". The revised mall plans included an amusement park and a water park. DreamWorks Animation CEO Jeffrey Katzenberg announced in July 2012 that some of the amusement attractions would be themed upon DreamWorks productions. In September 2016, Triple Five announced that the indoor amusement park space would be occupied by Nickelodeon Universe, and that DreamWorks Animation would work in partnership to develop the water park.

Triple Five stated in June 2018 that the water park would open in the end of 2019. By November 2018, the mall's vice president of Communications announced that the water park would open in September 2019. However, by that date, DreamWorks Water Park's opening had been delayed to November 27, 2019. In October 2019, surfers began testing the 1.5-acre (0.61 ha) wave pool. Six days before the scheduled opening, Triple Five announced that they were postponing the water park opening again due to undisclosed reasons. On February 25, 2020, the New Jersey Department of Community Affairs announced that 18 of the 27 rides at the park had been inspected and approved for opening. Of the other nine, four had completed engineering review and were ready for inspection, and the last five rides were still in engineering review.

On February 27, 2020, DreamWorks Water Park announced an opening date of March 19, 2020. However, due to the onset of the COVID-19 pandemic in New Jersey, its opening was delayed once again. On September 3, 2020, American Dream announced the new opening date for the water park. DreamWorks Water Park officially opened on October 1, 2020.

=== Incidents ===
DreamWorks Water Park was temporarily closed on February 19, 2023, after a decorative helicopter fell into a swimming pool, injuring four people. The park later reopened six days later on February 25, 2023, with the helicopter permanently removed.

== Attractions ==
DreamWorks Water Park occupies six stories adjacent to Nickelodeon Universe American Dream. According to the mall's organizers, DreamWorks Water Park is the largest indoor water park in the United States, at 8.5 acres (3.4 ha). (Note: The DreamWorks Water Park is alternatively advertised as the largest in North America, including the United States.) Specific areas include an area themed around Shrek's Soggy Swamp, a Kung Fu Panda-themed children's play area called the Kung Fu Panda Zone, and a Madagascar-themed tower called Madagascar Rain Forest with 15 water slides. All of the park's water slides were exclusively developed by ProSlide Technology, a Canadian company. Inside is a 1.5-acre (0.61 ha), 1,500,000-U.S.-gallon (5,700,000 L) indoor wave pool and a lazy river which runs through Shrek-themed scenery. DreamWorks Water Park also contains a set of dueling slides, the world's second-tallest body slides, starting from a height of 142 feet (43 m) and featuring a 50-foot (15 m) free fall. Another attraction is a 1,600-foot-long (490 m) hydro-magnetic roller coaster called "DreamWorks DreamRunner". That ride is the only one themed towards the How to Train Your Dragon franchise. There is also a mat-racing water slide called Trolls Rainbow Racer.

There are also 31 luxury cabanas within DreamWorks Water Park. These were built to plans by interior designer Jonathan Adler, a native New Jerseyan. Themed decorations include balloons of Shrek and Donkey from the Shrek movie franchise, and Alex and Marty from the Madagascar movie franchise. Characters such as Shrek, Puss In Boots, Alex the Lion, King Julien, the Penguins of Madagascar, Po, and Poppy and Branch from Trolls, make daily appearances at the water park.

=== List of attractions ===
- Mad Flush – Body Bowl Slide
- Bubbly Lazy River (Home)
- Far Far A Bay Wave Pool
- Forbidden Waters Hot Tubs
- King Julien's Pineapple Jam Swim-Up Bar
- Kung Fu Panda Temple Of Awesomeness Play Structure
- Soakin' Surfari (Former attraction, since replaced by kids' dry play area)
- The Penguins Frozen Fun Zone
- Dragon And Donkey's Flight – Family Raft Slide
- Trolls Rainbow Racer – 6 Lane Mat Racer (previously called Dragon Racers)
- Lemur Leap – Tube Bowl Slide
- Speeding Frenzy – Tube Slide (Turbo)
- Swamp N' Splash – Triple Funnel Slide
- Tube It! – Tube Slide
- Penguins Plummet
- Majunga Jump
- Shrek's Sinkhole Slammer – ProSlide Tornado
- Zany Zigzag – Body Slide
- Zanier Zigzag – Body Slide
- DreamWorks Dream Runner – Water Coaster (previously called Toothless Trickling Torpedo)
- Thrillagascar – Drop Launch Capsule Slide
- Jungle Jammer – Drop Launch Capsule Slide
- Surfari Slider – Double Down Drop Capsule Slide
- The Carnivortex – Horizontal Loop Drop Capsule Slide

== List of slides ==
1. Zany Zigzag - Body Slide
2. The Carnivortex- Horizontal Loop Drop Capsule Slide
3. Swamp n’ Splash - Triple Funnel Slide
4. Speeding Frenzy - Tube Slide (Turbo)
5. The Penguins Frozen Fun Zone
6. DreamWorks Dream Runner - Water Coaster (previously called Toothless Trickling Torpedo)
7. Zanier Zigzag - Body Slide
8. Kung Fu Panda Temple Of Awesomeness Play Structure
9. Tube It! - Tube Slide
10. Jungle Jammer - Drop Launch Capsule Slide
11. Penguins Plummet
12. Majunga Jump
13. Surfari Slider - Double Down Drop Capsule Slide
14. Dragon And Donkeys Flight - Family Raft Slide
15. Thrillagascar - Drop Launch Capsule Slide
16. Trolls Rainbow Racer - 6 Lane Mat Racer (previously called Dragon Racers)
17. Lemur Leap - Tube Bowl Slide
18. Shrek's Sinkhole Slammer
19. Mad Flush - Body Bowl Slide
