= List of Iranians by net worth =

The following is a list of Iranians or people of Iranian descent by net worth who are reported by Forbes and other mainstream news outlets to have estimated net worth in excess of US$500 million.

World rank	Name	Other citizenship	Net worth (USD)	Source of wealth	Reference
1,394	Farhad Moshiri	United Kingdom	2.8 billion (2021)	diversified	
2,999	Isaac Larian	United States	1.1 billion (2021)	MGA Entertainment	

== Previous Forbes billionaires ==
Year(s)	Name	Other citizenship	Peak net worth (USD)	Source of wealth	Reference
2014–2015	Elghanayan family	United States	2.2 billion (2015)	property	
2006–2009	Omid Kordestani	United States	2.2 billion (2007)	Google	
2014–2015	Merage family	United States	1.8 billion (2015)	microwavable snacks	
2007	Manny Mashouf	United States	1.3 billion (2007)	Bebe Stores	
2005–2013	Nasser Khalili	United Kingdom	1.0 billion (2007)	art, real estate	

https://www.forbes.com/profile/adam-foroughi/ 2012- Adam Foroughi, United States, Applovin, 21 billion (2025) Forbes

== Other reported billionaires and multi-millionaires ==
Name	Other citizenship	Peak net worth (USD)	Source of wealth	Reference
Kam Ghaffarian	United States	3.8 billion (2023)	business (space)	
Behdad Eghbali	United States	3.4 billion (2021)	real estate	
Ghermezian family	Canada	2.5 billion (2016)	Triple Five Group	
Hushang Ansary	United States	2 billion	oilfield services	
Kamran Hakim	United States	1.8 billion (2014)	property	
Sean Rad	United States	1.2 billion (2021)	Tinder	
Arash Ferdowsi	United States	1.1 billion (2018)	Dropbox	
Danyel Group	United States	1.0 billion (2017)	real estate	
Ardeshir Naghshineh	United Kingdom	0.991 billion (2008)	Targetfollow	
Hassan Khosrowshahi	Canada	0.838 billion (2015)	Future Shop	
David Alliance	United Kingdom	0.791 billion (2017)	N Brown Group	

== See also ==
- Asadollah Asgaroladi - Iran's richest person
- Forbes list of billionaires
- List of countries by the number of billionaires
