= Vancity =

Canadian credit union

Vancouver City Savings Credit Union
- Trade name: Vancity
- Type: Credit union
- Industry: Financial services; Commercial banking
- Founded: 1946; 80 years ago
- Headquarters: Vancouver, British Columbia
- Key people: Wellington Holbrook
- Revenue: CA$529.6 million (2019)
- Net income: CA$60.9 million (2019)
- Total assets: CA$35.5 billion (2023)
- Number of employees: 2,675 (2019)
- Subsidiaries: Vancity Community Investment Bank
- Website: www.vancity.com

Vancouver City Savings Credit Union, commonly referred to as Vancity, is a member-owned financial co-operative headquartered in Vancouver, British Columbia, Canada. By asset size, Vancity is the largest community credit union in Canada as of 2019, with CA$28.2 billion in assets plus assets under administration, 60 branches and more than 543,000 members.

== History ==
Vancity began operations in 1946 as an open-bond credit union in Vancouver, British Columbia, Canada. Initially a financial co-operative consisting of 14 Vancouver residents, Vancity has grown to serve British Columbia's Lower Mainland and the Victoria region of Vancouver Island.

On September 28, 1946, 14 Vancouver residents signed a charter to establish an open-bond credit union that would be open to any resident of the city, regardless of social affiliation. On October 11, 1946, Vancouver City Savings Credit Union opened to the public. By the end of 1946, total assets were $2,966 ($51810 in 2026).

Vancity first operated out of a former machine shop on the corner of Broadway and Quebec streets in Vancouver. By the end of 1951, membership had reached 2,000. Assets grew rapidly after the introduction of personal chequing accounts in the same year, reaching $5 million in 1962, $10 million in 1965, $100 million in 1973, and $1 billion by 1980. As of 2018, current assets are $22.9 billion.

In 2009, Vancity attempted to force 18,000 of its members to sign documents that would have allowed the credit union to unilaterally increase interest rate on lines of credit where a loan agreement had already been signed, to "keep access to your lines of credit and avoid any disruptions", threatening that it may have had to "take further action" on their accounts should they not have complied. Vancity abandoned this course of action later that year in response to adverse publicity and backlash from members.

=== Milestones ===
Vancity has a history of innovation in the North American financial services market:

- 1946: the first financial institution to provide mortgages for properties in Vancouver's working class east end.
- 1959: the first financial institution in Canada to offer open mortgages.
- 1961: the first financial institution in British Columbia to provide mortgages to women without a male co-signer.
- 1967: the first financial institution in Canada to offer a daily interest savings account, calculating interest earnings on a daily basis.
- 1980: the first financial institution in Canada to offer an all-in-one banking statement.
- 1986: offers Canada's first socially responsible mutual fund, the Ethical Growth Fund.
- 1988: the first financial institution in Canada to offer a Registered Education Savings Plan.
- 1991: the first credit union in Canada to acquire a trust company, Citizens Trust Company.
- 1997: the first financial institution in Canada to establish a branchless bank, Citizens Bank of Canada.
- 2002: the first financial institution in Canada to market to the gay and lesbian community through mainstream advertising.
- 2008: the first financial institution in North America to become carbon neutral.
- 2010: the first financial institution in Canada to join the Global Alliance for Banking on Values.
- 2011: the largest organization in Canada (at the time) to adopt a Living Wage policy.
- 2014: one of the first mainstream financial institutions to launch an alternative to payday loans for its members, the Vancity Fair & Fast Loan™.
- 2017: Citizens Bank of Canada renamed Vancity Community Investment Bank (VCIB).
- 2019: VCIB acquired CoPower, a sustainable investment platform that issues green bonds and funds loans for clean energy and energy efficiency projects.
- 2022: Vancity becomes the first Canadian financial institution to set real estate emissions reduction targets.

=== List of directors ===
- Robert Arthur Williams (1983–1995, 2007–2016)

== Services ==
Vancity's primary lines of business include retail and business banking (deposit-taking and lending) and mortgage lending. Through wholly owned subsidiaries, Vancity also operates foreign exchange, life insurance, Visa credit cards, real estate development, and investment advisor services.

Through its subsidiaries Citizens Bank and Vancity Community Investment Bank, Vancity was formerly a major issuer of prepaid reloadable Visa and non-reloadable cards which were branded for various resellers, including Arctic Co-Op and Canada Post. The high fees and expiry dates associated with the cards were the subject of a class action suit which named Peoples Trust Company, Peoples Card Services Limited Partnership, Peoples Card Services Ltd., Vancouver City Savings Credit Union, Citizens Bank of Canada, Amex Bank of Canada and All Trans Financial Services Credit Union Limited among its defendants.

Vancity responded by withdrawing the cards from the market in 2021. The Canada Post / Zenwallet prepaid Visa did return to the market in October 2022, but with Peoples Trust as the issuing institution.

== Membership ==
Vancity is a member of Central 1 Credit Union and is registered with the Credit Union Deposit Insurance Corporation of British Columbia. In December 2010, Vancity joined the Global Alliance for Banking on Values (GABV).
