= Great Mall of Las Vegas =

- Location: Las Vegas, Nevada, United States
- Coordinates: 36°17′11″N 115°16′51″W
- Address: Grand Montecito Parkway
- Developer: Triple Five Nevada
- Owner: Triple Five Group
- Architect: Howard Perlman
- Num. of stores: 160 (planned in 2008); 185 (planned in 2009)
- Floor area: 1,600,000 sq ft (150,000 m^{2}) (planned in 2006); 850,000 sq ft (79,000 m^{2}) (planned in 2008)
- Floors: 3 (planned in 2006); 1 (planned in 2008)

The Great Mall of Las Vegas was a proposed shopping mall in Centennial Hills, Las Vegas, Nevada, United States. The project was announced by Triple Five Group in 2004, originally as an enclosed mall. The design phase continued over the next two years, with the project being reworked to include indoor and outdoor retail areas, as well as condominiums. The project would feature 1,600,000 sq ft (150,000 m^{2}) of retail space, with the indoor portion spread across three floors.

In 2008, the project was further modified to be entirely outdoors, with 850,000 sq ft (79,000 m^{2}) of retail space across 20 standalone buildings, each one story. The project was once expected to open in 2009 or 2010, but it never progressed beyond site preparation work. Triple Five put the project on hold in 2009, due to the Great Recession, and the property was later sold. In 2019, plans were announced to build a housing community on the land.

== History ==
=== Initial plans and changes ===
Triple Five Group announced the Great Mall of Las Vegas in March 2004. The company had built some of the largest retail properties in the world, including West Edmonton Mall and the Mall of America; the Las Vegas mall would be similar to these projects. It would feature at least 2,000,000 sq ft (190,000 m^{2}), making it the largest mall in the Las Vegas Valley, a title held at the time by the Fashion Show Mall. The Great Mall of Las Vegas would be built in the northwest valley, near the Las Vegas Beltway and U.S. Route 95. The project would be built on more than 70 acres, in a developing area which lacked major retailers. The target demographic would consist of local residents rather than tourists.

The mall would be enclosed and would feature a glass-domed roof to allow natural lighting. Attractions would include an amusement park, an ice rink, and miniature golf. It would be the first indoor mall completed in the Las Vegas Valley since the Galleria Mall, which opened in Henderson, Nevada in 1996. The project was in an early phase of planning at the time of its announcement, and the next two years were spent on design work, with Howard Perlman as architect.

By 2006, Triple Five planned to incorporate 900 condominiums into the project, including two high-rises measuring 250 feet in height. Some nearby residents opposed this idea, citing concerns about increased traffic and a lack of backyard privacy. The Great Mall of Las Vegas received final approval from the Las Vegas City Council in July 2006, with infrastructure work scheduled to begin six months later. The project was expected to cost $750 million, and later $800 million. It would be developed by Triple Five Nevada, a subsidiary of the main company. The project, now with 1,600,000 sq ft (150,000 m^{2}), would include indoor and outdoor retail areas. The indoor component would consist of three stories and include several anchor stores. The outdoor portion was modeled after The District at Green Valley Ranch, located in Henderson. It would include retail, entertainment, and the 900 residential units, with the two towers limited to 200 feet.

The Great Mall of Las Vegas was expected to open in 2009 or 2010. However, the start of construction was delayed by unforeseen issues between Triple Five and the city. In January 2008, Triple Five announced revamped plans for the project, which would now be entirely outdoors. It would feature 20 standalone buildings, each one story. Later in 2008, Triple Five renamed the project Streets of Montecito, after its location at the northeast corner of Grand Montecito Parkway and Deer Springs Way. Work was underway on utilities and roadways, and Triple Five assured nearby residents that the project would proceed despite the Great Recession, with a potential opening in 2010. The 850,000 sq ft (79,000 m^{2}) mall would have 160 retail spaces, and occupants would include JCPenney and a Regal Cinemas.

=== Cancellation and aftermath ===
Triple Five put the project on hold in May 2009, citing the Great Recession and decreased demand. At the time, it was expected to include 185 stores and 16 restaurants. Triple Five noted the possible start of construction within a year and a half, depending on economic conditions. However, the property went into default, and KeyBank took possession. EHB Companies purchased the 60-acre site in 2010, for $6.3 million. In 2019, KB Home and The Calida Group announced plans to purchase the vacant property and build a community of 303 single-family homes and 491 apartment units respectively.
