= Triple Five Group =

Canadian conglomerate

- Type: Private
- Industry: Shopping malls; Real estate
- Founded: 1965; 61 years ago (as Germez Developments)
- Founder: Jacob Ghermezian
- Headquarters: Edmonton, Alberta, Canada
- Area served: Worldwide
- Key people: Nader Ghermezian (chairman); Don Ghermezian (CEO)
- Owner: Ghermezian family
- Number of employees: 5,000
- Divisions: MOAC Mall Holdings, LLC; Ameream, LLC (for both American Dream and American Dream Miami)
- Subsidiaries: American Dream; Peoples Group; American Dream Miami (proposed); Mall of America; West Edmonton Mall
- Website: triplefive.com

Triple Five Group is a Canadian conglomerate based in Edmonton, Alberta, which specializes in shopping centres, entertainment complexes, hotels, and banks, along with running three indoor amusement parks. The company owns and operates the three largest malls in North America: the West Edmonton Mall in Alberta, the Mall of America in Minnesota, and American Dream in New Jersey, each of which contains a wide variety of entertainment attractions alongside traditional retail.

== History ==
=== Early years (1965–1981) ===
Germez Developments was founded by Jacob Ghermezian in 1965, and his family, the Iranian-Canadian Jewish Ghermezian family, remains the owners and operators of the company today. Jacob's four sons were the core of the business, and after them the brothers' children have begun to take leadership roles in the company, including CEO Don Ghermezian and Braze founder Mark Ghermezian.

In the mid-1970s, Germez Developments was involved in land speculation on the outskirts of Edmonton. The province of Alberta established "restricted development areas" (RDAs) encircling Edmonton and Calgary in 1974, and two years later announced that the areas would be used as "transportation and utility corridors". Germez was one of several companies that bought up large parts of the RDA ring around Edmonton, paying higher prices to rural landowners than the government was willing to offer. Despite not being allowed to develop the land, Germez dramatically raised its prices before selling its parcels back to the government. The Ghermezians made an $18 million profit when the Albertan government purchased the land in 1979, and much of that profit was used to finance their first retail project, the West Edmonton Mall.

=== Entering retail (1981–1992) ===
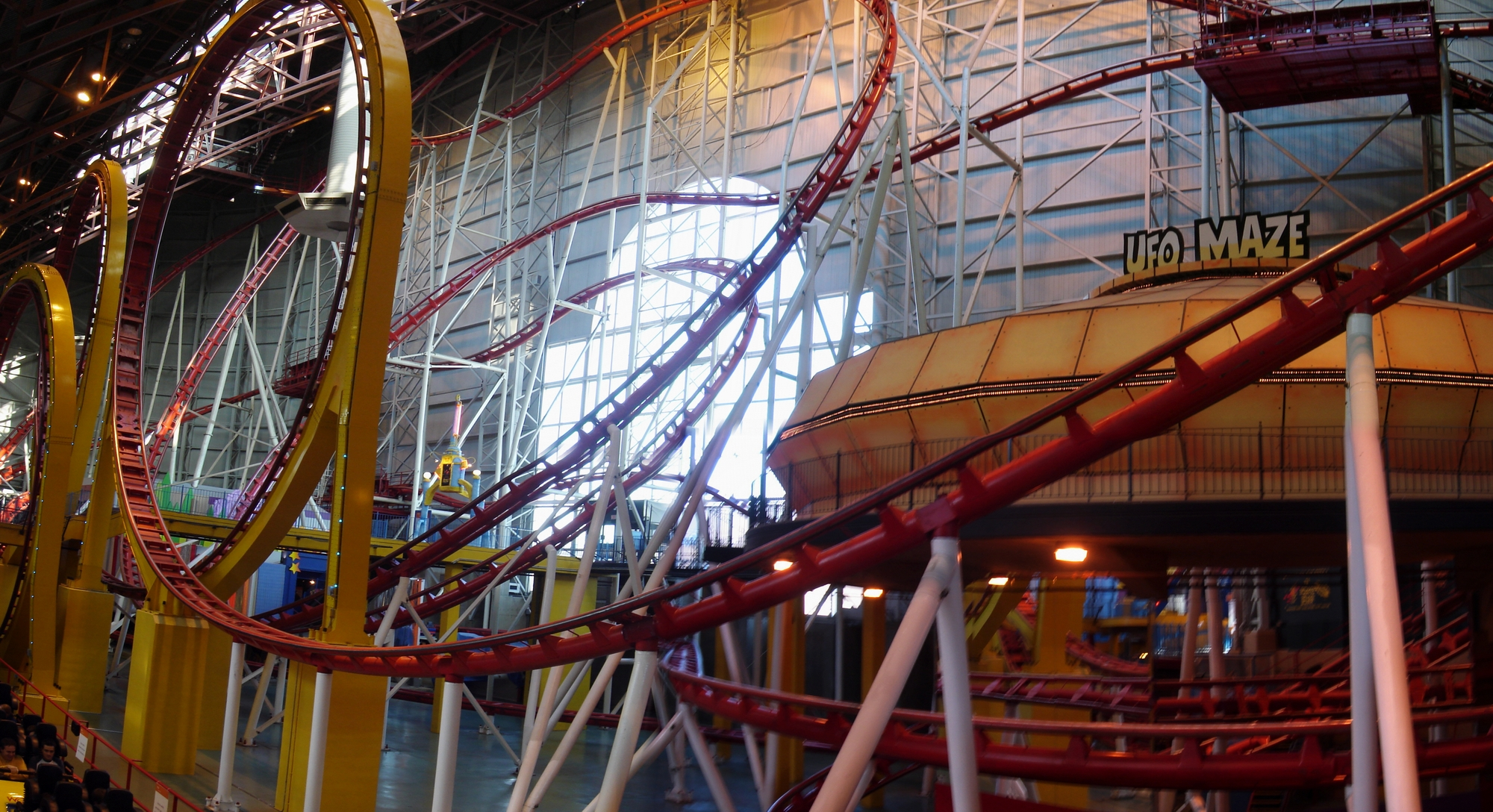
Mindbender rollercoaster at the West Edmonton Mall

The Ghermezians began developing the West Edmonton Mall in 1974. Early in the development process, Raphael Ghermezian was faced with allegations of attempted bribery towards an alderman on the Edmonton city council. Eskandar Ghermezian retaliated with accusations of favor-seeking against the son of another Edmonton alderman. The first phase of the mall was completed in 1981, and Triple Five immediately began further construction for a second phase which opened in 1983 and a third in 1985. These expansions brought the West Edmonton Mall from the largest in Canada to the largest in the world.

In addition to building the West Edmonton Mall, Triple Five also developed the Eaton's Centre mall and mixed-use development in downtown Edmonton, which began development in 1980 and opened in 1986. The Ghermezians held a 50% stake in the complex, alongside Confederation Life Insurance, which bought Triple Five's share of the development for $1 in 1991.

In 1985, Triple Five created Peoples Trust, a bank and trust company whose first branch was located in their West Edmonton Mall. When Peoples Trust opened, its primary focus was on residential mortgages and guaranteed investments. Today, there are branches across Canada, and the bank offers several other services, including mortgages for care facilities and other commercial properties, and prepaid credit cards.

After the demolition of the Metropolitan Stadium in Bloomington, Minnesota, in 1985, the Ghermezian brothers approached the Bloomington Port Authority with a proposal for their second mall, which would be larger than West Edmonton Mall was at the time. The project was quickly approved, and ultimately became the Mall of America, which has remained the largest mall in the United States since it opened in 1992.

=== Searching for a third project (1986–2011) ===
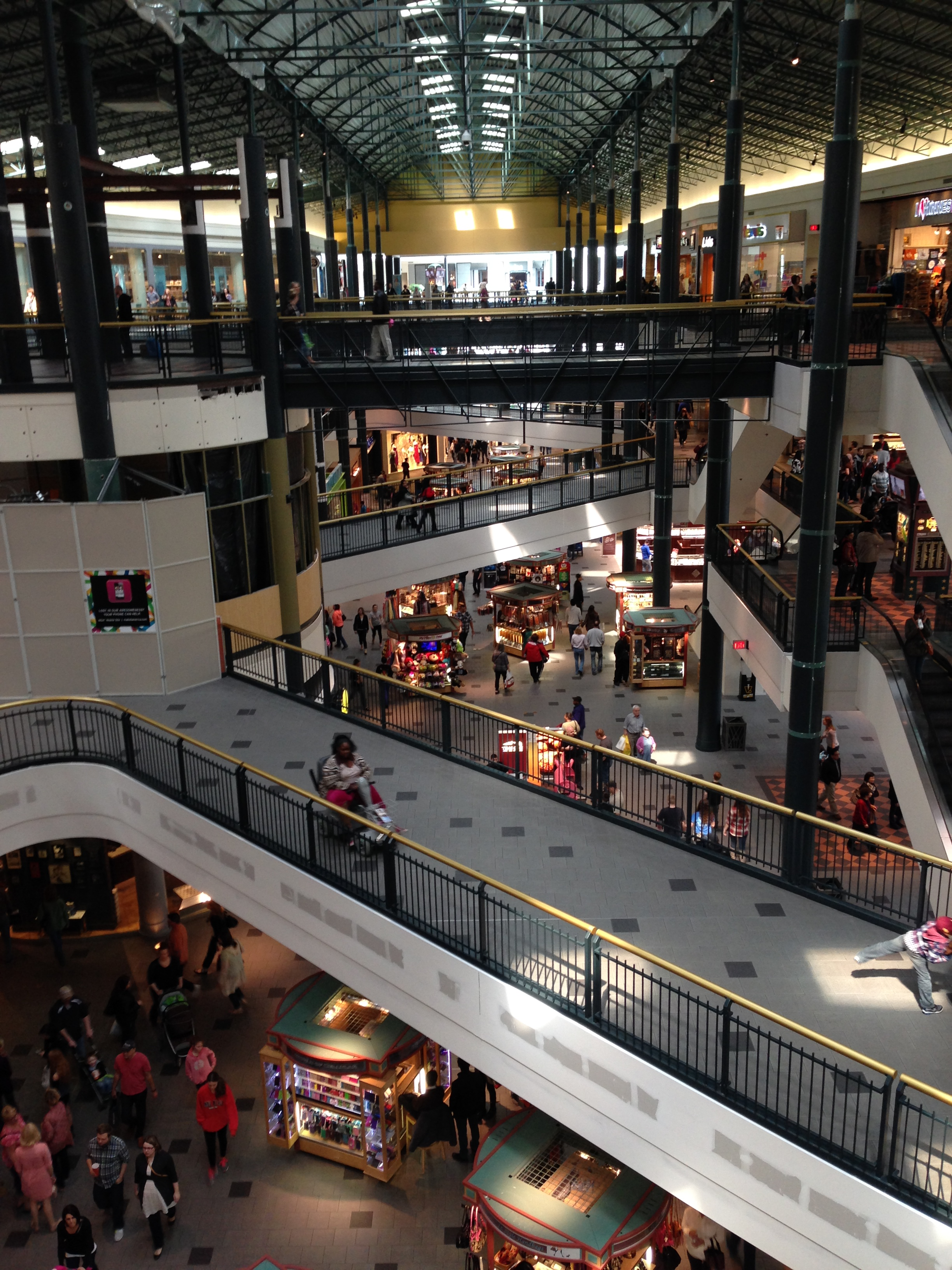
The West Market area of the Mall of America

Triple Five announced its plans in 1986 to build its third major project, considering Toronto, Montreal, and Niagara Falls, New York as possible locations. Montreal was dropped from consideration soon after, pitting the other two cities against each other for a project that was then dubbed "Fantasyworld". In the Toronto suburb of Mississauga, the first proposed location was rejected and the project was ultimately dropped. In Niagara Falls, the state of New York offered $400 million in subsidies to build Fantasyworld. The state later canceled its offer after deciding that the project was unlikely to be completed while Triple Five was preoccupied with building the Mall of America.

The late-1980s Soviet policy of glasnost encouraged Western businesses to seek opportunities in Russia and the other Soviet republics. In December 1988, Triple Five proposed building a megamall in Moscow, competing with the Cyrus Eaton Group's similar proposal in Leningrad. Both proposals were dropped, and within the month Triple Five had moved on to a proposal for a complex in Holbeck, Leeds, England. In addition to over 1,500,000 square feet (140,000 m^{2}) of retail floor space, the Leeds development would have demolished significant parts of Holbeck to build a series of octagonal skyscrapers for mixed-use development. The project was intended to be completed by 1993, but was never approved. Other Triple Five proposals prior to 1994 were made in Burnaby, British Columbia, Tampa, Florida, Beijing, China, Burbank, California, Oberhausen, Germany, and various cities in Japan.

The American Dream Mall was first proposed for Silver Spring, Maryland, in the Baltimore–Washington metropolitan area, in August 1995. A mixed-use development with an area of 2,150,000 square feet (200,000 m^{2}), Triple Five proposed that only 650,000 square feet (60,000 m^{2}) be used for retail space, while also including an NHL-sized ice hockey rink, a large wave pool, an IMAX theater, and a Fantasyland hotel similar to the West Edmonton Mall hotel. With the support of Montgomery County, the plan grew to include "a multimedia educational facility, sports club, and wellness center", and at the request of a board of local residents, a performing arts center and a miniature golf course were added to the project. As with Fantasyworld in Niagara Falls, local and state governments in Maryland were concerned by the amount of public money that was expected to fund the project. Montgomery County gave up on the American Dream project by the end of 1996, and ultimately the site was used for a smaller commercial development called Downtown Silver Spring.

In the early 2000s, Triple Five fought a legal battle over the majority ownership of the Mall of America. TIAA-CREF, who had held a 27.5% equity stake in the property since 1989, sold its share to Simon Property Group in 1999, making Simon the mall's majority owner. Triple Five sued, arguing that this deal was made in secret and that Simon breached its fiduciary duty in doing so. Simon was forced to sell the 27.5% stake to Triple Five when the case was decided in 2003, making Triple Five the majority owner of the mall it had developed and operated.

Triple Five announced in 2004 that its next major project would be the Great Mall of Las Vegas. While not as large as the Mall of America, the plan for over 2,000,000 square feet (190,000 m^{2}) of floor space still would have placed it among the largest shopping malls in the nation. The project was approved by local authorities in early 2008 and was expected to begin construction by the end of the year. However, plans for the mall were shelved as a result of the late 2000s recession, and by the end of 2010 Triple Five defaulted on the loan for the mall's intended real estate. The 60-acre parcel was purchased in 2011 by EHB Companies for $6.3 million, and in 2019, the Las Vegas City Council approved plans for 303 single-family homes and 491 apartments to be built on the site.

West Edmonton Mall lost the title of world's largest shopping mall in 2004, with the opening of the Golden Resources Mall in Beijing, China. The following year, the New South China Mall in Dongguan opened and took the title, with an area of over 7,000,000 square feet (650,000 m^{2}). Triple Five has disputed whether these developments are actually shopping malls, and continues to claim that West Edmonton Mall is the world's largest. In 2005, Triple Five also attempted to enter the Chinese retail market with two proposed projects: the Mall of China in Dalian, and the Triple Five Wenzhou Mall in Wenzhou. Both of these were intended to feature over 10,000,000 square feet (930,000 m^{2}) of floor space, and each would have become the largest mall in the world if completed. As of 2015, a project called "Triple Five China Dream" had been announced as an addition to the under-construction Beijing Daxing International Airport.

Mark Ghermezian founded Appboy, a mobile marketing automation company based in New York City, in 2011. He has raised millions in venture capital investments from family members and Triple Five. The company, now known as Braze, advertises that it serves 420 million mobile users.

=== American Dream projects (2011–present) ===
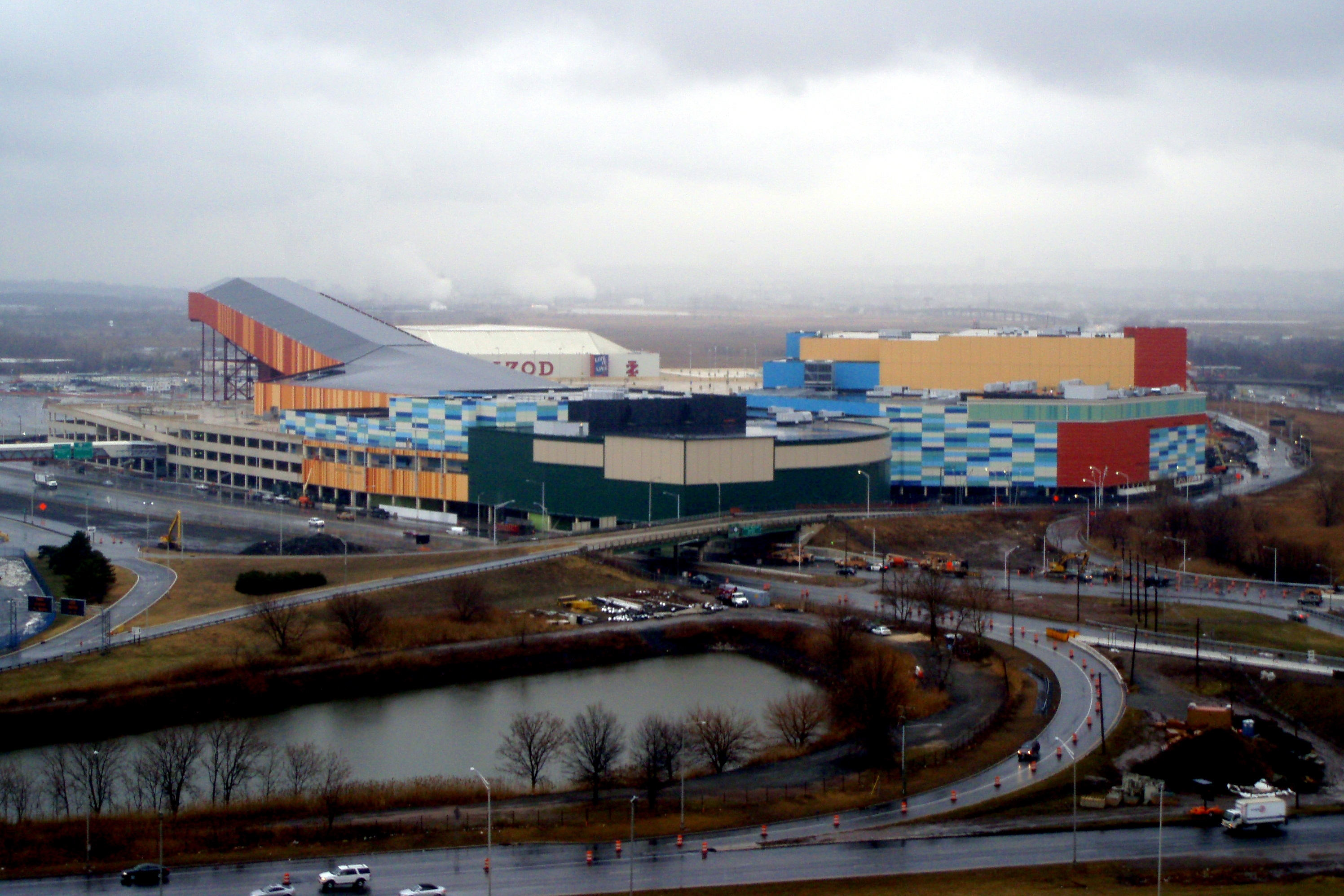
American Dream in 2009, before Triple Five ownership

On April 29, 2011, Triple Five took ownership of the unfinished Meadowlands Xanadu mall in East Rutherford, New Jersey, which had been under construction since 2004. The company had previously attempted to develop the site, having made a proposal for "MeadowFest America" in 2002 before construction on Meadowlands Xanadu began. The project was renamed American Dream, placing it under a brand that had previously been used for the Silver Spring project. The mall was intended to open in fall 2013, but legal disputes with the New York Giants and Jets and financial setbacks have continually delayed construction. The company has pledged 49% of its West Edmonton Mall and Mall of America to finance this project. As with many of Triple Five's projects, the company has requested significant public funding to build American Dream Meadowlands, and has received hundreds of millions of dollars from the state of New Jersey to finish the project. The mall opened on October 25, 2019.

The American Dream megamall posted $59.4 million in losses for 2021, and $254.4 million in losses in 2022. In November 2022, JPMorgan Chase gave Triple Five a four-year extension on repaying over $1.7 billion in construction borrowings.

Triple Five announced plans for American Dream Miami in 2015, a project in Miami-Dade County, Florida which would become the largest mall in the United States if built. As of May 2018, the proposal for American Dream Miami has been approved by local authorities, but construction on the mall has not yet begun, pending regulatory approval.

In 2022, Triple Five Worldwide LLC was sued in federal court for allegedly distributing counterfeit bottles of hand sanitizer containing potentially unsafe levels of methanol at the height of the COVID-19 pandemic, which unlawfully used the "Urbane Bath & Body" trademark of an unrelated company. Several members of the Ghermezian family have been implicated in the lawsuit. In February 2026, a jury returned a verdict against two members of the Ghermezian family and multiple business associates.

== Properties and businesses ==
=== Major properties ===
- West Edmonton Mall in Edmonton, Alberta, Canada (opened September 15, 1981)
- Mall of America in Bloomington, Minnesota, United States (opened August 11, 1992)
- American Dream Meadowlands in East Rutherford, New Jersey, US (opened on October 25, 2019)
- American Dream Miami in Miami, Florida, US (planned, projected opening 2026)

=== Nevada Development Corporation ===
- Boca Park, Las Vegas (sold 2009)
- Colonnade Square, Las Vegas
- Peccole Ranch, planned community in Las Vegas
- Village Center Square, Las Vegas (sold 2009)
- Village Square at Peccole Ranch, Las Vegas (sold 2011)
- Grand Canyon Parkway

=== Other properties ===
- Gilbert Town Square, Gilbert, Arizona
- Greenhill Estates, planned community in Chowchilla, California
- Village Square at Dana Park, Mesa, Arizona

=== Former properties ===
- Edmonton City Centre, Edmonton
- Westmount Centre, Edmonton
- Convention Inn South, Edmonton
- Argyll Plaza Hotel, Edmonton

=== Other businesses ===
- Peoples Trust Company, Vancouver, British Columbia
