= Grand Canyon Parkway =

- Location: Las Vegas Valley, Nevada
- Coordinates: 36.1133°N 115.3094°W
- Address: 4195 S Grand Canyon Dr, Las Vegas, NV 89147
- Opened: 2005
- Num. of stores: 90
- Num. of anchor tenants: 4 (3 open, 1 vacant)
- Floor area: 2,500,000 sq ft (230,000 m^{2})
- Floors: 1
- Parking: 2,000

Grand Canyon Parkway is a 125-acre (51 ha) open air shopping center in Spring Valley, Nevada, United States, located at Grand Canyon Drive and Flamingo Road. The center encompasses 2,500,000 square feet (230,000 m^{2}) of space.

The shopping center's anchors are JCPenney, Kohl's, and Target (originally opened as Target Greatland).

== History ==
The shopping center was proposed by Triple Five Nevada Development after plans to develop part of the site as a casino were abandoned.

On November 8, 2018, Sears Holdings announced that Sears Grand would be closing as part of a plan to close 40 stores nationwide. The store closed in February 2019. A portion of the former Sears Grand is now occupied by Floor & Decor, which opened on November 28, 2022.
