= American Dream Miami =

Proposed shopping mall in Florida, United States

- Interactive map of the American Dream Miami area

General information
- Status: On hold
- Location: Miami-Dade County, Florida, U.S., Ronald Reagan Turnpike and I-75
- Coordinates: 25°56′21.1″N 80°21′25.1″W

Technical details
- Floor area: 6.2 million square feet (580,000 m^{2})

Design and construction
- Developer: Triple Five Group

Other information
- Number of stores: 500+
- Number of anchors: 8
- Parking: 8 floors above ground, 2 floors below ground
- Public transit access: I-75 Park & Ride Lot, Metrorail (Miami-Dade County) Green Line

American Dream Miami is a proposed megamall and entertainment complex planned to be built in Miami-Dade County, Florida, United States. If completed, it would become the largest shopping mall in North America. The project shares its branding with American Dream in Bergen County, New Jersey; the second largest mall in the U.S. The mall is being developed by Triple Five Group, who own the three largest malls in North America: Mall of America, West Edmonton Mall, and American Dream.

The mall is slated to contain a large indoor water park and ice rink. However, American Dream Miami has been stalled because of financial problems, Triple Five missing state-level construction deadlines, and substantial road improvements which will not be supported by the public following criticism from competing developers. The developer is also having land disputes with the Graham Companies, which proposed a mixed-use development on the site rather than a shopping center with theme parks. Most of the delays mirror what the New Jersey American Dream would originally be developed as (Meadowlands Xanadu), which was also stalled due to financial difficulties, land disputes, and rival mall companies.

== History ==
In March 2015, Triple Five Group announced plans for a megamall called American World. However, the name was later changed to American Dream Miami to match its sister project, American Dream Meadowlands. The project was planned to be completed by 2020 and attract 30,000 visitors a day.

Criticism for American Dream Miami arose in January 2017, when Simon Property Group partnered with General Growth Properties (GGP) and Taubman Centers to form the South Florida Taxpayers Alliance. All three companies argued that public support and taxpayer funds for the project would unfairly disadvantage their competing properties, being Pembroke Lakes Mall, Sawgrass Mills, and Dolphin Mall. This forced Triple Five Group to agree to pay for their own road improvements, including a commitment to pay $60 million in impact fees and an estimated $210 million for road and interchange expansions.

Graham Companies proposed a related mixed-use development in March 2017, which would create 2,000 apartment units, additional retail space, and 1 million square feet (93,000 m^{2}) of office space that would be finished by 2040 and would cost $1.1 billion to build. In April of that same year, the opening date of the project was pushed back to 2022 due to financing issues. Controversy also arose in 2017–18 around the project, as it could hurt the nearby Everglades National Park and create significant traffic problems along with adding to an oversaturated retail market in the region.

On May 17, 2018, the county board gave final approval to the commercial zoning for the site, allowing Triple Five to begin obtaining the permits needed for construction. It was also announced the project would not receive any taxpayer funding. Within the month, the board of county commissioners approved Triple Five's plan to purchase state land for construction.

In May 2018, nearby Broward County threatened a lawsuit against the project, arguing that Miami-Dade County underestimated the potential impact on Broward County traffic. The debate over construction of the mall became an issue in the Democratic primary of the 2018 Florida gubernatorial election, as candidate Gwen Graham was criticized by environmentalists, progressives, and UNITE HERE for her ties to the project.

Due to the COVID-19 pandemic, the mall was delayed once more and underwent design changes. However, Triple Five stuck with the original design. With the 2022 opening date scrapped, and its current opening date being late 2026, construction of the complex partially depends on the Florida Turnpike extension.

== Proposal ==
The mall is planned to be in northwestern Miami-Dade County, within the Miami-Dade County's Urban Development Boundary. The site was first dredged in the 1920s and used as a dairy farm by Ernest "Cap" Graham, who later became a member of the Florida Senate. Ernest is also the founder of Graham Companies. The Graham family stopped running the dairy farm in the 1950s and the site became wetland and remains another one of the large undeveloped areas with Miami-Dade's Urban Development Boundary. The mall is expected to cost over $5 billion and As of 2017 has not started construction. At 6.2 million square feet, the mall will be the largest in North America, and the 6th largest mall in the world.

=== Shopping ===
- 5 anchor tenants
- 3.5 million square feet (330,000 m^{2}) of retail space

=== Attractions ===
- Water park with indoor beach
- Amusement park
- Ferris wheel
- Legoland Discovery Center
- Aquarium
- Ice rink
- Indoor ski slope
- Indoor artificial lake (offering submarine rides similar to what West Edmonton Mall used to have, alongside boat rides & water skiing)
- Art Deco Village
- Tivoli Garden

=== Hotels ===
- 300 room hotel
- 400 room hotel
- 900 room hotel
