= Grand Central Stockport =

Leisure complex in Greater Manchester, England

- Location: Stockport, Greater Manchester, England
- Coordinates: 53°24′23″N 2°09′40″W
- Address: Wellington Road South
- Opened: 1991 (Complex); 1993 (Grand Central Pools)
- Owner: Stockport Metropolitan Borough Council (SMBC)
- Architect: Broadway Malyan (Redevelopment)
- Floor area: 76,000 sq ft (7,100 m^{2})
- Floors: 2–3
- Parking: 554 (1,500 after redevelopment)

Grand Central Pools
- Grand Central
- Interactive map of Grand Central Pools
- Full name: Grand Central Pools
- Address: Stockport, Greater Manchester, England

Construction
- Opened: 1993 (pools); 2001 (fitness suite)

Grand Central Stockport is a retail, entertainment and leisure complex in Stockport, Greater Manchester, England. It is adjacent to Stockport railway station and the complex first opened in 1991. Since then it has included various leisure facilities such as a multiplex cinema, a swimming pool, a Cineworld Cinema a bowling alley, a gym, a Quasar complex, and various food outlets. As of 2013, the area is being redeveloped and only half of the development is still open, including the pool, along with some other businesses. The remainder of the complex (including the bowling alley) nightclub and cinema has been demolished in preparation for a new multistorey car park and office complex.

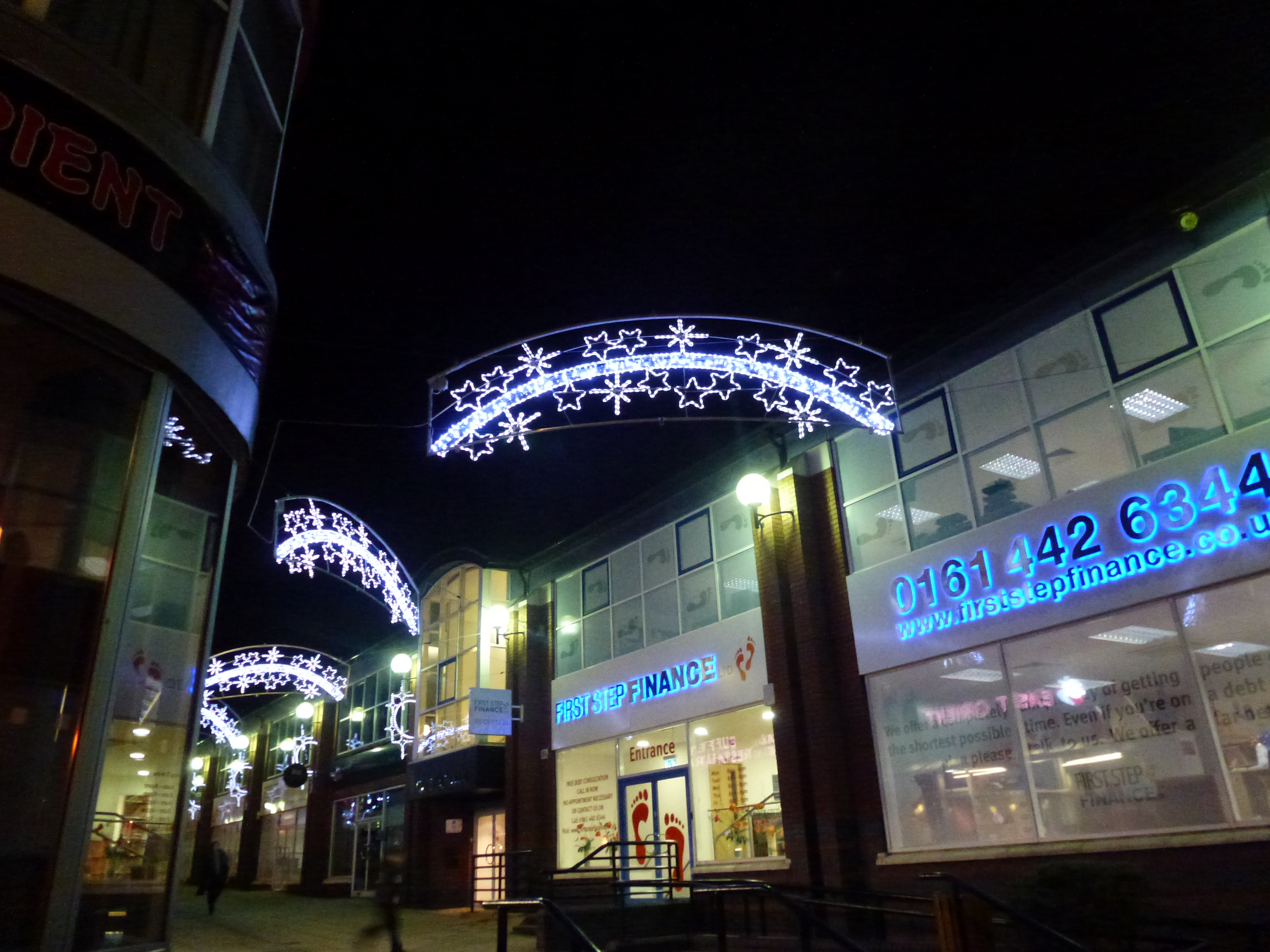
The entrance to Grand Central from Wellington Road South in 2012

Grand Central Stockport was owned by Norwich-based private property company Targetfollow, who acquired the complex for £10.8 million in 2004. In January 2011, after lack of progress on the development scheme, Stockport Metropolitan Borough Council (SMBC) purchased the complex. In December 2011, Stockport Council announced that Muse Developments, the urban regeneration division of construction company Morgan Sindall, had been selected as the preferred developer with a report to be presented to the council the following week. The revamped regeneration plans include an office quarter for the town centre, a hotel, public space outside the railway station. In addition, the redevelopment would also include a multi-storey car park and to make the site into a more attractive gateway into the town centre. The new redevelopment plans are valued at approximately £145 million.

== Facilities ==
The Grand Central's pools have the only 50m swimming pool in Stockport, and are operated by Life Leisure (trading name of Stockport Sports Trust) on behalf of Stockport Council. Life Leisure took over the running of the pool from Serco Leisure in October 2011. In 2008 the pool was named as a British Swimming Intensive Training Centre, one of only five across the United Kingdom. In addition, the Stockport Metro Swimming Club are based at the pool. Former facilities include a Heaven & Hell nightclub, which closed in 2006 after the chain went into administration and the premises were reclaimed by Targetfollow.

The centre contains three separate car parks, all containing different tariffs. Some are in place to provide extra parking for rail users, with all day and longer stay tariffs, however the majority of space is for those using the complex.

== Redevelopment ==
It was announced in February 2007 that the complex was to be redeveloped by then owners Targetfollow, at an estimated cost of £100 million. The development was to have been completed by 2010. The proposals were designed as a part of Stockport Council's 'Future Stockport' masterplan. The redevelopment plans have been put on hold following the financial crisis, as of 2010 development has not commenced. The redevelopment plans include construction of a multi-storey car park, adding of a more significant retail element to the complex and a Travelodge hotel. In total the redevelopment will add 400,000 sq ft (37,000 m^{2}) to the scheme and nearly triple the car parking spaces to 1,500. It will also include 200 residential apartments and improved public spaces. The planning application was submitted in July 2007. The planning application was successful and outline planning permission for the entire scheme was granted.

In July 2010, the then owners of the complex, Targetfollow, narrowly avoided going into administration, after loans exceeding £200 million provided by Lloyds Banking Group, expired. In total, the company's debt in July 2010 was estimated at £700 million.

In January 2011, Stockport Council purchased the complex, citing lack of progress on the redevelopment scheme. In December 2011, Muse Developments were selected as the preferred developers for a revamped £145 million scheme containing an office quarter, hotel, larger car park and more public space, and with the exception of the swimming pool and cinema, demolition of the other buildings, including where the nightclubs formerly stood, took place in the spring of 2012 as part of the future plans for the complex. The new multi storey car park opened in February 2014.

As of 2013, the three detailed phases of the council's redevelopment plan are scheduled for completion in 2014, 2015, and 2020.
