= Ghermezian family =

Canadian business family

The Ghermezian family
- Current region: North America
- Origin: Pahlavi Iran
- Estate: Triple Five Group

The Ghermezian family (Persian: خانوادهٔ قرمزیان) is a Canadian business family of Iranian Jewish origin. The Ghermezians are best known for building North America's three largest shopping malls: West Edmonton Mall, Mall of America, and American Dream. The family has been based in Edmonton since 1964.

The family members are Orthodox Jews and many do not make public appearances.

== History ==
The Ghermezian family originates from Pahlavi Iran, where they dealt in rugs for several generations. In 1895, Elijah Ghermezian founded the family business. Sometime before World War II, the family moved to Tehran.

Jacob Ghermezian (1902 – 3 January 2000), was born and grew up in Iran. He became one of the wealthiest businessmen in the country, and during 1943, he hosted U.S. President Franklin Roosevelt, U.K. Prime Minister Winston Churchill, and Soviet leader Joseph Stalin in his apartment during the critical Tehran Conference, where the three world leaders discussed the final stages of World War II and planned their path to victory. In the early 1950s, Jacob moved his family to Montreal where he opened Ghermezian Bros. on Sherbrooke Street. By the mid 1960s, the business included 16 stores across North America, and was the largest importer of oriental rugs to the United States.

In 1964, the family moved west and settled in Edmonton, hoping to capitalise on the province's booming oil economy. In 1967, they incorporated as Ghermez Developments Ltd., which in 1973 became Triple Five Corp. Ltd. The family acquired vast quantities of farm land surrounding Edmonton in the hope of finding oil, but their search proved unsuccessful. However, in the 1970s the province set out to build a green belt around Edmonton. Through this project, the Ghermezians made a fortune selling farm land to the government. The four sons, Eskandar, Nader, Raphael and Bahman, grew the family rug business into a large real estate and construction company.

In 1994, the family initially defaulted on $450 million in loans, after the bank they had used, Royal Trust, entered bankruptcy. The family, however, insisted they would find an alternative lender, which they did, ultimately making their payment in full.

In Edmonton, the family members live in adjacent houses of the same neighborhood which are connected by enclosed walkways.

== American mega-malls ==
The family's estates include the West Edmonton Mall in Edmonton, Alberta, and the Mall of America in Bloomington, Minnesota (built in 1992), along with many other businesses. In 2011, the family's Triple Five Group acquired the troubled Meadowlands Xanadu project in New Jersey, which they renamed to American Dream. The mall opened on October 25, 2019. However, due to the COVID-19 pandemic, mall attendance was slow to take off, and due to the leveraged position, it was reported that secured creditors would possibly take up to 49% of the equity in their other mega-malls. The family's investments in mega-malls was criticized by those who believed that the country already had too much retail space, but the Ghermezians argued their offer is closer to enclosed family resorts with a shopping option, tagging it retailtainment. In 2018, the family got the green light to start the construction of American Dream Miami, planned to become the country's largest shopping center.

In 2026, a teenager was arrested for plotting a terrorist mass shooting at the Mall of America, citing the Jewish backgrounds of its owners as one of his motives.

== Family members ==
- Elijah (Eliyahu) Ghermezian
  - Yacoub (Jacob) Moshe Ghermezian (1902 – 2000), m. Nenehjan (Myriam)
    - Eskandar Ghermezian
      - David Ghermezian
      - Don Ghermezian
      - Syd Ghermezian
      - Jennifer Ghermezian
      - Shayna Ghermezian
      - Tony (Shimon) Ghermezian
    - Raphael Ghermezian
      - Pam Ghermezian
      - Sharon Ghermezian
    - Nader Ghermezian
      - Diana Ghermezian
      - Rabbi Michael Ghermezian
      - Rabbi John Ghermezian
      - Justin Ghermezian
      - Roy Ghermezian
    - Bahman Ghermezian
      - Paul (Baruch) Ghermezian
      - Mark Ghermezian
      - Allen (Yehudah) Ghermezian
