= Peter Charney =

Canadian bungee jumper (born 1989)

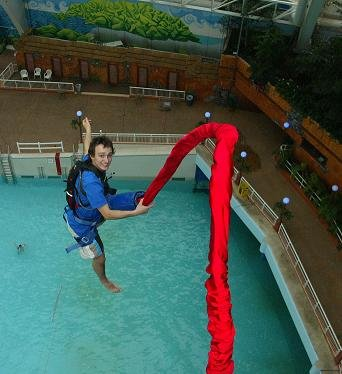
- Peter Charney

Background information
- Born: October 2, 1989 (age 36); Saskatoon, Saskatchewan, Canada

Peter Charney (born October 2, 1989) is the current Guinness World Record holder for the most indoor bungee jumps in twenty-four hours.

Charney first attempted the record in November 2006 as part of the Guinness World Records Day. During that attempt he completed 106 jumps in 24 hours, setting a new Guinness World Record. Due to facility issues he was forced to have a 10-hour extended break.

He completed his second successful attempt on 6–7 November 2007 in the West Edmonton Mall World Waterpark, Edmonton, Canada. After 23 hours he reached his goal of 225 jumps—averaging nine jumps per hour and up to 32 in one hour.

Both of his attempts were in support of a local charity and raised just over $5000.
