= Targetfollow =

Property investment and development company in Norwich, England

Targetfollow Group Limited
- Type: Private
- Industry: Land and Property; Development
- Founded: 1992
- Founder: Ardeshir Naghshineh
- Headquarters: Targetfollow Group Limited, Riverside House, 11 - 12 Riverside Road,, Norwich, NR1 1SQ, United Kingdom
- Key people: Ardeshir Naghshineh (Founder); Corin Thoday (CEO)
- Website: targetfollow.co.uk

Targetfollow is a property investment and development company in the United Kingdom, established in 1992 and specialising in city centre buildings.

The company's initial founders were Ardeshir Nagshineh and Tom Bullus.

In 1996, they bought 40 Bernard Street from the McAlpine family. And in the years that followed the company changed its investment strategy from one of acquiring single-let offices to multi-let ones. In 2001, Naghshineh bought out Bullus' stake.

Leading up to 2010, Targetfollow acquired many landmark real estate properties throughout the UK, including Centre Point, 60 St Mary Axe and Baskerville House.

In July 2010, Targetfollow narrowly avoided going into administration, after loans exceeding £200m provided by Lloyds Banking Group expired. In total, the company's debt in July 2010 was estimated at £700m. Much of this was lent at the peak of the property boom in 2007 by HBOS. As a result of this, the company has offered a number of its Central London properties up for sale. However it has been reported that Targetfollow would rather find a joint venture partner for its Central London portfolio, and it was Lloyds Banking Group who requested the properties be put up for sale in order to repay the outstanding debt.

Two subsidiaries went into administration on 27 October 2010.

In January 2011, Grand Central Stockport, a leisure scheme in Stockport, Greater Manchester formerly owned by Targetfollow and in the hands of administrators Deloitte, was purchased by the local authority.

In recent years, one of Targetfollow's assets, The Pantiles, has become an increasingly popular tourism destination. It is host to Jazz on The Pantiles, a music festival that has been held there for over 20 years.

== Development Projects and Assets ==
Below is a list of current Targetfollow development projects and assets:

- Dukes Wharf, Norwich
- The Pantiles, Royal Tunbridge Wells
- Tunbridge Wells and Rusthall Commons, Royal Tunbridge Wells
- Empire House, Dewsbury
- 27-28 Tombland, Norwich
- Cambridge House, Norwich
- Princes Street, Ipswich
- Peterborough One Retail Park, Peterborough

Previous Targetfollow development projects include:

- Baskerville House, Birmingham
- Harford Place, Norwich
- Princes Street, Ipswich
- Baskerville Wharf, Birmingham
- Crete and Candia Towers, Liverpool
- 60 St Mary Axe, London
