= Peoples Group =

Canadian financial services company

Peoples Trust Company
- Trade name: Peoples Group
- Industry: Financial services
- Founded: 1985; 41 years ago
- Headquarters: Vancouver, British Columbia
- Area served: Canada, United States
- Key people: John Landry, CEO
- AUM: CA$25.4 billion (2023)
- Parent: Triple Five Group
- Subsidiaries: Peoples Bank of Canada
- Website: peoplestrust.com

Peoples Trust Company, operating as Peoples Group, is a Canadian financial services company based in Vancouver, British Columbia. Peoples Group operates as a trust company and also maintains a chartered bank subsidiary, Peoples Bank of Canada. It is a subsidiary of the Alberta-based holding company Triple Five Group and maintains offices in Vancouver, Montreal, Calgary, and Toronto.

== Services ==
Services provided by Peoples Group:

- Mortgage origination (CMHC and conventional lending for Multi-Family, Commercial, Construction, and Residential)
- Mortgage servicing
- Structured finance
- Deposit services Agents and Consumers (GICs, RRSPs, TFSAs, e-Savings)
- Acquiring ISOs and merchants
- Issuing prepaid and credit cards (BIN Sponsorship)
- Money Movement (EFT, Interac)

== Membership and affiliations ==
Peoples Group and its subsidiary Peoples Bank of Canada are separately members of the Canada Deposit Insurance Corporation (CDIC). Peoples Group is a member of Canadian Lenders Association and Open Finance Network of Canada.

== Class Action Lawsuit ==
On May 13, 2019, the Ontario Superior Court awarded $16.8 million (CAD) (including $1.5 million in punitive damages) to plaintiffs in a class action lawsuit regarding fees and unused balances the company seized from consumers of its prepaid gift cards between 2012 and 2014. The settlement was approved by a judge in September 2020 and all eligible Ontarians are able to make a claim. The lawsuit covers activities until 2014 but the company continued to issue cards and collect fees that saw the card face value decrease progressively as Peoples Group continued to deduct monthly 'service' fees. So a user who bought a $100 card and didn't use it, would eventually see the balance decrease to $0.

Impacted cards as part of the lawsuit included: Vanilla Prepaid Visa or MasterCard, Give and Go Prepaid Visa, House Points, The Ideal Choice/Online Payment Card MasterCard, Shell Non-Reloadable MasterCard. Along with reloadable prepaid cards under the product names of: Nextwave Titanium+ Prepaid Visa, EPIC Prepaid MasterCard, Evolve Prepaid Visa, HorizonPlus Prepaid MasterCard, PTC Company US Dollar Prepaid MasterCard, Shell Prepaid Reloadable MasterCard and YesCard Prepaid Visa.
