= Braze, Inc. =

American software company

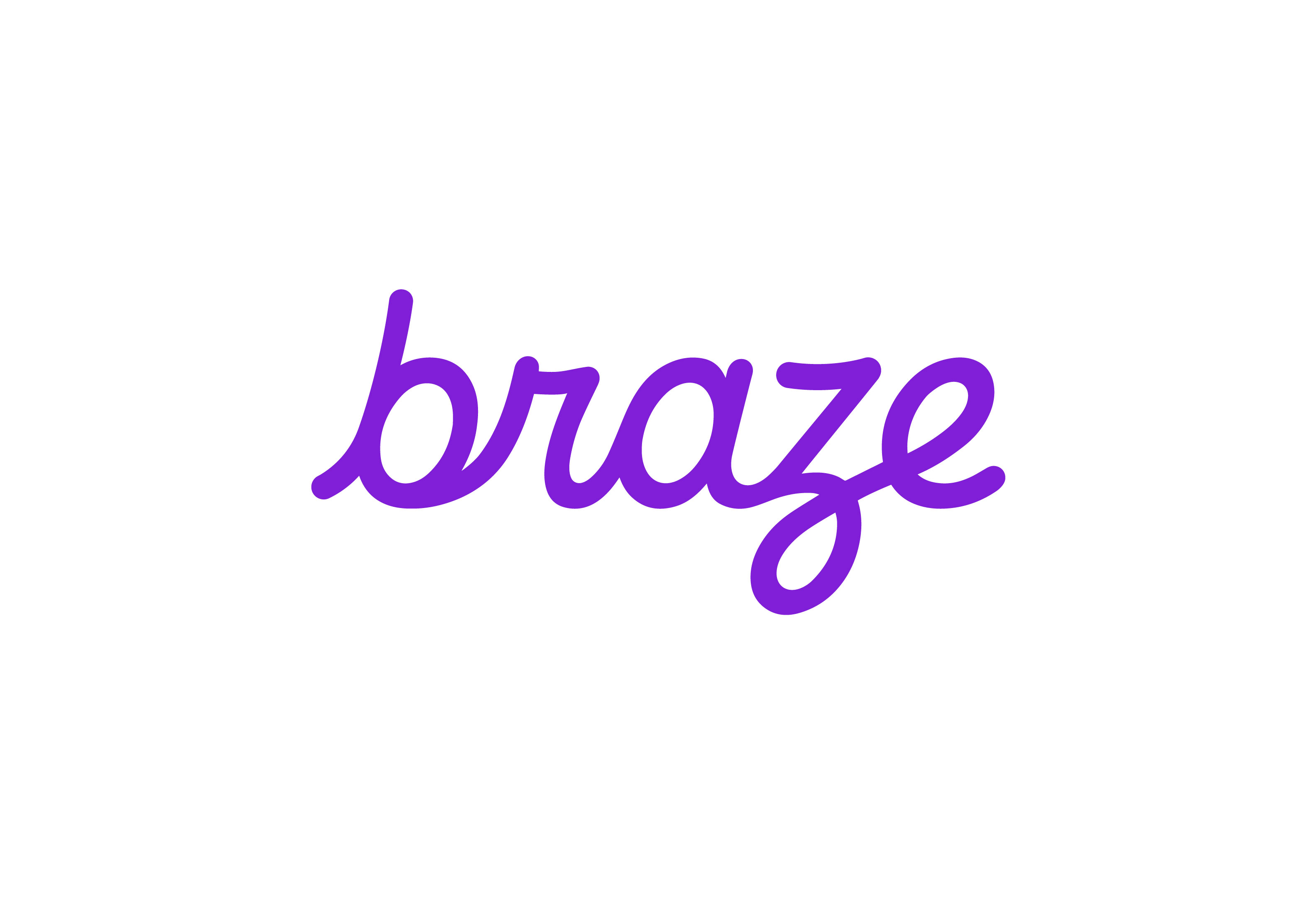
- Formerly: Appboy Inc. (2011–2017)
- Type: Public
- Traded as: Nasdaq: BRZE
- Industry: Software
- Founded: 2011; 15 years ago
- Founders: Mark Ghermezian; Bill Magnuson; Jon Hyman
- Headquarters: New York, NY, U.S.
- Key people: Bill Magnuson (chairman, CEO, president, co-founder); Jon Hyman (co-founder, CTO); Ed McDonnell (CRO); Astha Malik (CBO); Pankaj Malik (CFO and chief accounting officer); Priyanka Singh (chief people officer); Nick Rockwell (CIO)
- Products: Customer Engagement Platform
- Revenue: ▲US$738 million (2025)
- Net income: ▼ −US$131 million (2025)
- Number of employees: 2000+
- Website: www.braze.com

Braze, Inc. is an American cloud-based software company based in New York City. It is a customer engagement platform used by businesses for multichannel marketing.

== History ==
Braze was co-founded as Appboy in 2011 by Bill Magnuson, Jon Hyman, and Mark Ghermezian, who raised $3 million from investors to start the company. In 2016, Appboy launched the CRM and reward system Canvas.

In August 2017, the company received $50 million in Series D Financing and later that year, Appboy rebranded to Braze, Inc. The company launched Braze Alloys in 2018, a network of over 45 integration applications with companies like Segment, mParticle, and Amplitude. The company raised $80 million in Series E funding, with a valuation of $850 million, and opened an office in Singapore.

In 2019, Braze added Google AMP for email and passed $100 million in annual recurring revenue. In 2020, Braze boycotted Facebook advertising and encouraged other brands to do the same over content moderation practices. The company also joined several other marketing tech firms to offer technology grants to Black founded businesses with the Tech for Black Founders program. At this time, Braze was delivering over 100 billion messages each month and had raised over $175 million in funding.

Braze also commissioned the Data Privacy Report which provides details about consumers and their privacy concerns. Along with Skyscanner and Apptopia, Braze published the Ready for Takeoff 2021 Travel Industry Trends, Insights and Strategies. Braze introduced integrations with Snowflake and Shopify.

In October 2021, Braze filed to go public. On November 17, 2021, Braze’s IPO raised $520 million and had a market valuation of $5.9 billion. In 2023, Braze updated its artificial intelligence capabilities, and renamed it Sage AI by Braze. In 2024, the company announced further expansion to Brazil, Bucharest, Dubai, and Seoul.

Salesforce, Inc signed a definitive agreement to acquire Braze on October 20, 2026.

== Activities ==
Braze provides customer engagement technology for MAX, Skyscanner, PureGym, Burger King, Babylon Health, Grubhub, NASCAR, OkCupid, TUI, and the NBA.
