= West Edmonton Mall =

Megamall with attractions in Alberta, Canada

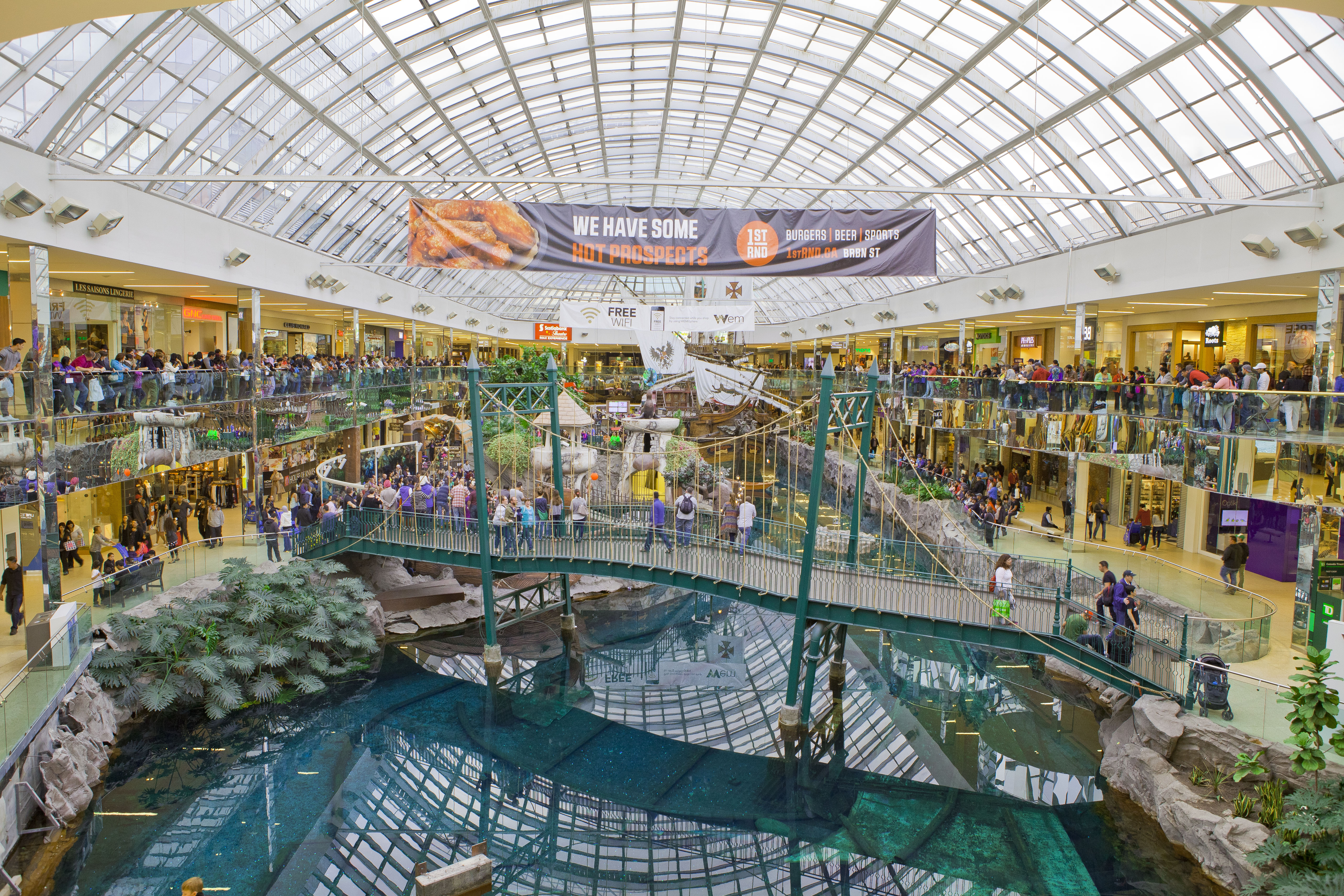
- The Sea Life Caverns wing, 12 October 2015.
- Coordinates: 53°31′22″N 113°37′23″W
- Address: 8882 170 St NW, Edmonton, Alberta T5T 4J2
- Opened: 15 September 1981; 45 years ago
- Developer: Triple Five Group
- Manager: Danielle Woo alongside The Ghermezian family
- Owner: Triple Five Group
- Architect: Maurice Sunderland
- Num. of stores: more than 800
- Num. of anchor tenants: 14
- Floor area: 350,000 m^{2} (3,800,000 sq ft) (leasable); 490,000 m^{2} (5,300,000 sq ft)(total)
- Floors: 2
- Parking: 20,000+, 10,000 overflow
- Public transit: West Edmonton Mall Transit Centre
- Website: www.wem.ca

West Edmonton Mall (WEM) is a large shopping mall in Edmonton, Alberta, Canada, that is owned, managed, and operated by Triple Five Group. It is the second most visited mall in Canada, after the Toronto Eaton Centre in Toronto, followed by Metropolis at Metrotown in Burnaby, and the 29th largest in the world (tied with Fashion Island and the Dubai Mall) by gross leasable area. It is the second largest shopping mall, by square footage, in North America behind the Mall of America in Bloomington, Minnesota. Mall of America encompasses 520,000 m^{2} (5.6 million square feet) and West Edmonton Mall encompasses 490,000 m^{2} (5.3 million square feet). By store count, West Edmonton Mall tops all in the Western Hemisphere as it currently counts over 800 occupants, in comparison to Mall of America's 520 occupants. The mall was founded by the Ghermezian brothers, who emigrated from Iran in 1959.

West Edmonton Mall has over 800 stores and services including nine attractions, two hotels and over 100 dining venues in the complex, and parking for more than 20,000 vehicles. More than 24,000 people are employed at the property. The mall receives about 32 million visitors per year; it attracts between 90,000 and 200,000 shoppers daily, depending on the day and season.

== History ==
=== 1959–1981: Planning and construction ===
West Edmonton Mall was conceived by the Ghermezian family, who had emigrated from Iran to Canada in 1959, establishing a successful rug business in Montreal known as the Ghermezian Bros. on Sherbrooke Street. The company became the largest importer of oriental rugs in the mid-1960s, being featured in 16 states across North America. The Ghermezians relocated to Edmonton, Alberta in 1964, with the goal of financing the high oil economy in the province. Then, in 1965, Jacob Ghermezian, alongside his brothers (Eskandar, Nader, Raphael, and Bahman) founded Ghermez Developments, Ltd. and relocated to Ottawa in the late 1960s, where they proposed West Edmonton Mall. The company became the Triple Five Group in 1973, with the Ghermezians envisioning a "retail Disneyland"—a mixed-use complex that combined shopping with massive entertainment facilities—which was a concept virtually unknown in North America at the time.

In the mid-1970s, the Ghermezian family purchased large tracts of agricultural land on the outskirts of Edmonton, located in the neighborhood of Summerlea. The provincial government established a "transportation and utility corridor" (a ring road zone) around the city. The Ghermezians owned key parcels within this zone, and although they could not develop this specific restricted land, they sold it back to the provincial government in 1979 for a massive profit—approximately $18 million. This capital was directly funneled into financing the construction of West Edmonton Mall, which would feature 225 tenants.

Getting the proposal approved, however, was challenging, as the site selected was zoned for residential use, not a megamall. City planning staff initially opposed the rezoning, preferring typical suburban housing. The developers leveraged the fierce rivalry between Edmonton and Calgary, nicknamed Battle of Alberta. They effectively argued that if Edmonton did not approve the project and grant concessions, they would simply build the mall in Calgary instead. Fearing the loss of such a massive economic engine to their rival, the Edmonton City Council was forced to approve the necessary zoning changes and land swaps for the project. Due to the sheer scale of the project, Triple Five Group announced that West Edmonton Mall would be developed in phases, with the initial build starting construction in 1979.

=== Grand opening and early years ===
Phase I of West Edmonton Mall had its grand opening celebration to the public on 15 September 1981. The mall was developed in four phases, completed in 1981, 1983, 1985, and 1999. It was the largest indoor shopping centre in the world until 2004, and was named such in the Guinness Book of Records. The four phases of construction are used in a colour-coded system as a guideline for finding stores and attractions. The indoor roller coaster, the Mindbender, had a fatal accident on 14 June 1986 when one of the rear cars derailed from the track and slammed into a nearby concrete pillar. Three people died and one was injured in the accident.

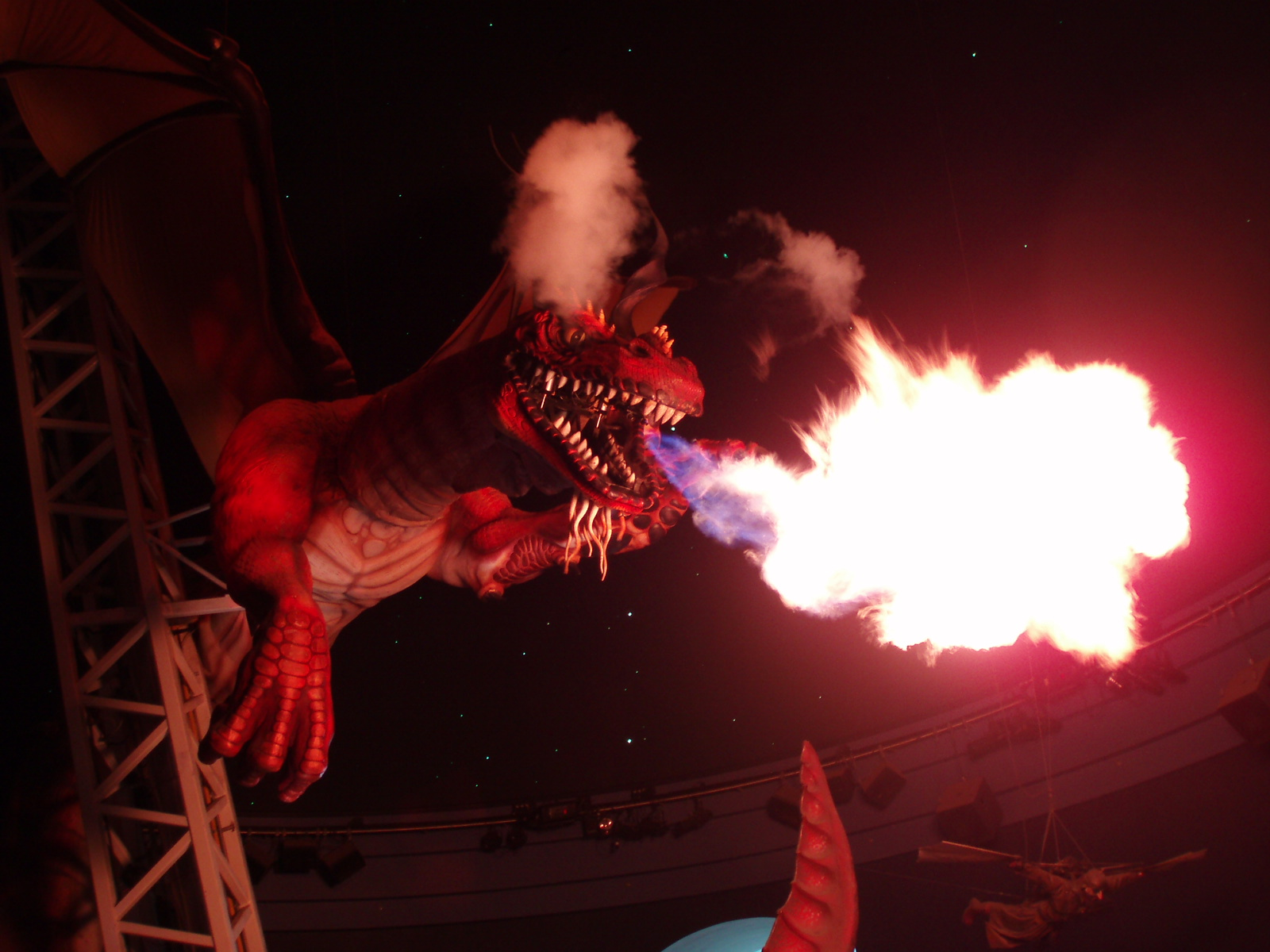
The former fire-breathing dragon animatronic at Scotiabank Theatre, 28 March 2007.

On 23 December 2000, a 22-year-old man drowned in a recreational lagoon. A man matching his description was seen swimming at about 2:30 am as the nearby drinking establishments had closed, though a second security check did not find anyone in the lagoon area. The man's body was found around 10:30 am later that morning, fully clothed except for his shoes and jacket, which were never located. He is believed to have accidentally drowned while under the influence of drinking alcohol and cannabis.

On 11 July 2004, the mall suffered millions of dollars in damage when a severe storm of hail and rain caused roofs to fail and drains to overflow. The Ice Palace and surrounding sections were the most damaged, and the World Waterpark had a sewage overflow. The damage was promptly repaired.

Construction on a total renovation of the mall shopping areas through all the phases began in the spring of 2011. The 'face lift' included the renovation of all mall common areas, which started in Phase I and finished in Phase IV. The most notable upgrades included the retrofit of an existing water fountain into choreographed musical dancing fountains, hanging décor of ceramic roses in the Rose Court near the Victoria's Secret (these are no longer there) and glass oil droplets around the Oilmen statue outside the Phase I Food Court. Most of the renovations were completed in 2014; however, some areas of the mall continued construction, such as Park Lane and Chinatown.

In 2017, the mall announced that the Ice Palace would undergo a renovation, retrofitting it with the latest technologies including modern lighting and sound. The Ice Palace closed in mid-2017 and reopened in December. Later in mid 2018, the mall announced that the World Waterpark would undergo renovations worth $2.5 million in September 2018. All upgrades have since been completed.

In 2021 local car dealership Mayfield Toyota moved to the mall and rebranded as West Edmonton Mall Toyota, which is the world's largest full-service in-mall dealership. The dealership is on the main floor of the old Sears retail space in Phase I. It includes 65 service bays, a detailing centre, and a three-aisle drive-through that intersects the entire mall.

Since 2018, the mall has focused on adding several high-end retailers including Gucci, Balenciaga, Saint Laurent, Moose Knuckles, Moncler and Louis Vuitton.

In 2021, the mall added huge LED screens over the Deep Sea Adventure lake and Ice Palace to advertise stores, restaurants, and attractions in and around the mall.

In 2026, the mall changed its logo to one similar to the one the mall used from 1985 to 2005.

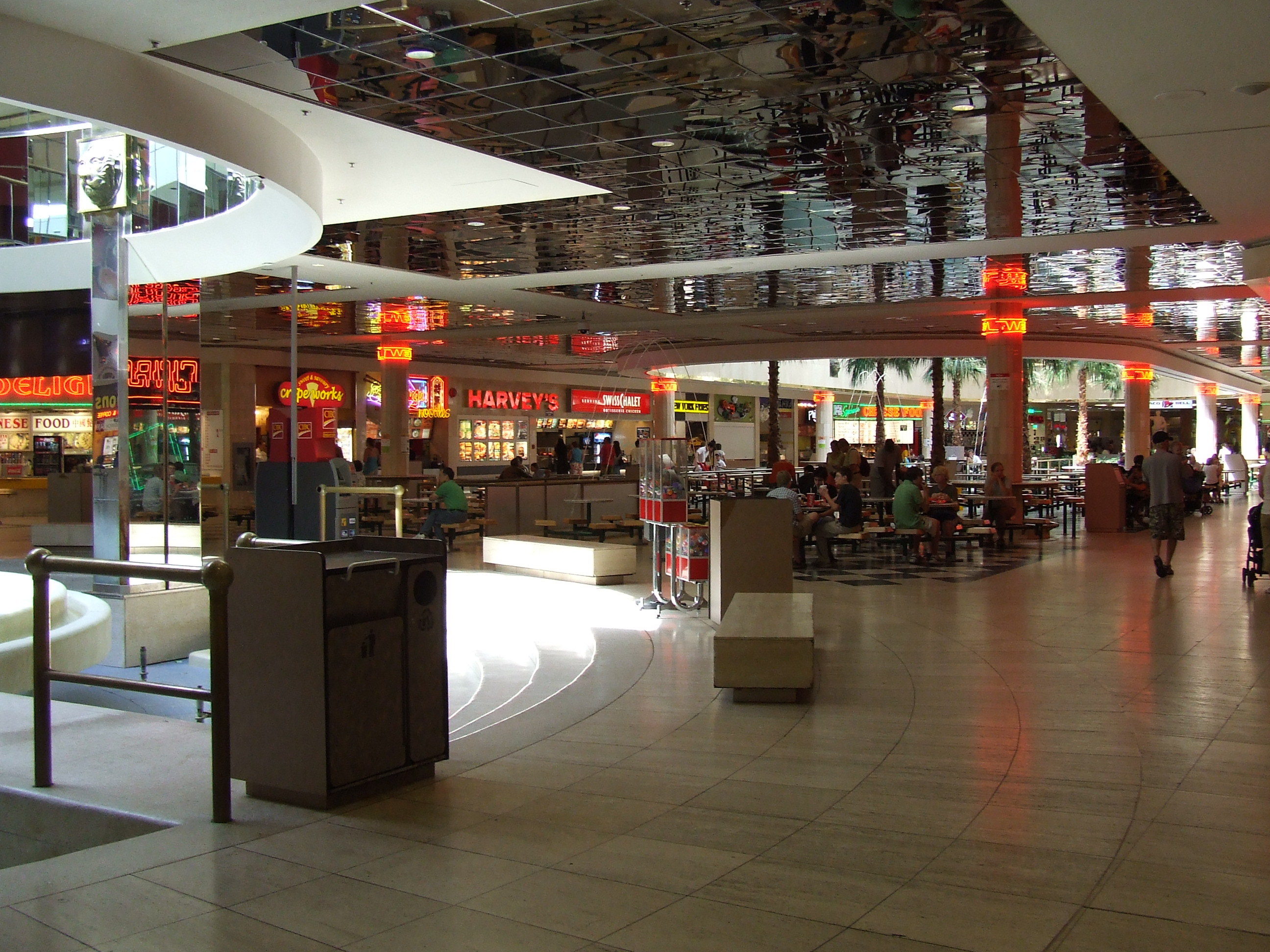
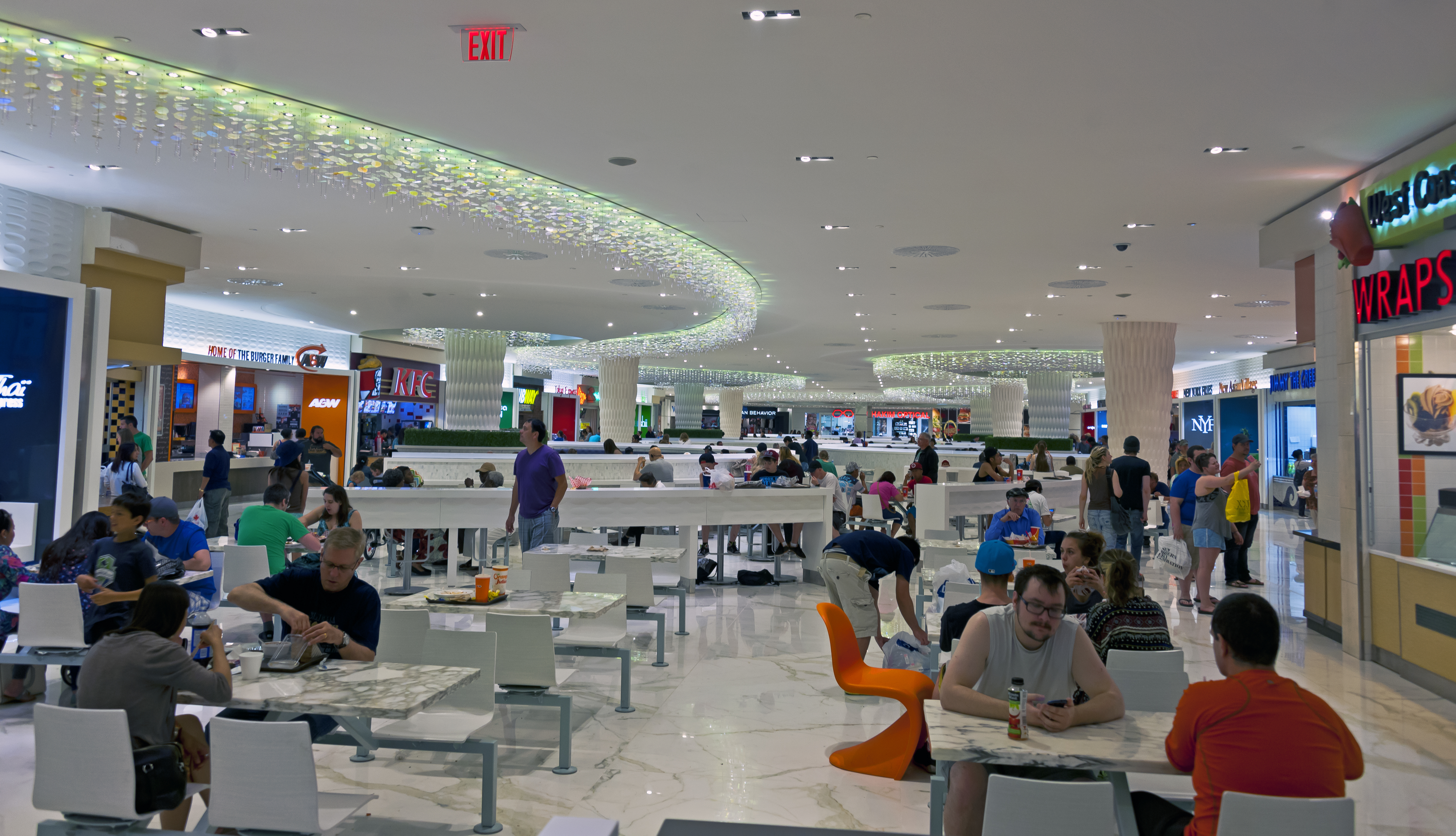
The Phase III food court at WEM. The top image is what the P3FC looked like prior to 2013 (31 August 2006). The bottom image is what it looked like on 27 June 2015.

=== World records ===
Current West Edmonton Mall world records include;

- World's largest indoor lake – Deep Sea Adventure Lake
- World's largest indoor wave pool – World Waterpark
- World's tallest indoor permanent bungee tower (no longer in use but still there) – World Waterpark
- World's largest parking lot with more than 20,000 spaces, and over 10,000 overflow spaces. – WEM's parking lot
- World's largest full-service in-mall dealership – WEM Toyota

==== Other records (past) ====
- World's largest indoor shopping mall (until 2004)
- World's tallest indoor roller coaster – the Mindbender
- Most bungee jumps in 24 hours record while indoors was set by Peter Charney, on 6–7 November 2007 at the World Waterpark, completing 225 jumps.

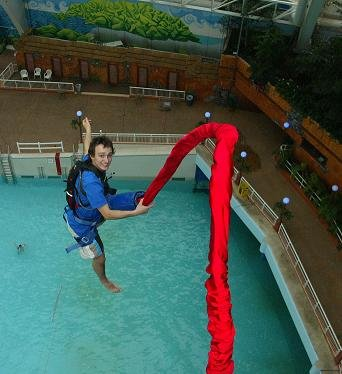
In 2007, Peter Charney broke the world record for the most bungee jumps in 24 hours.

== Major attractions ==
=== Galaxyland Powered by Hasbro ===
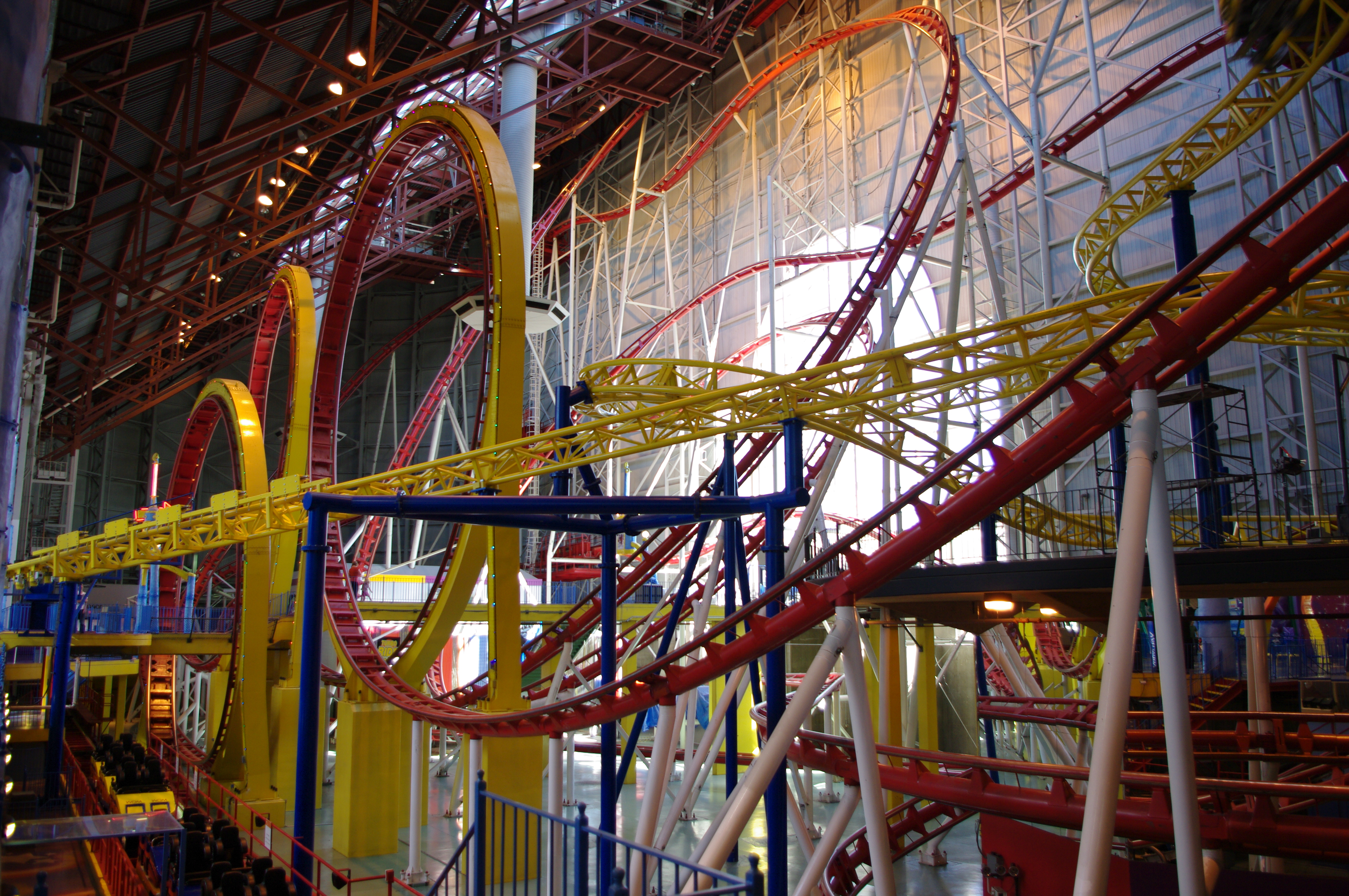
Mindbender rollercoaster at Galaxyland, 26 August 2010.

Galaxyland was originally known as "Fantasyland"; however, during a court battle with the Walt Disney Company, West Edmonton Mall changed the park's name to Galaxyland in July 1995 after completing major renovations. It undertook a complete redesign from the original theme, old Victorian fantasy, to a galactic space theme. It is an indoor amusement park on the north side of the mall and is the second-largest indoor amusement park in the world, behind Ferrari World, and features 24 rides and attractions. There are eight beginner rides, nine intermediate rides and seven thrill rides. The latest attraction in Galaxyland is Havoc, which opened in 2018. Management closed Drop of Doom in the early 2000s. The tower area was replaced shortly after by a more modern launch ride, the Space Shot, a S&S Double Shot Tower Ride. In late 2019, the park announced a new partnership with Hasbro, with several rides and attractions being rebranded with Hasbro toy brands. The renovation was scheduled to finish by winter 2020, and eventually had its grand opening as Galaxyland Powered by Hasbro on 17 December 2022. The Mindbender rollercoaster was decommissioned in January 2023 after 37 years of service.

=== World Waterpark ===
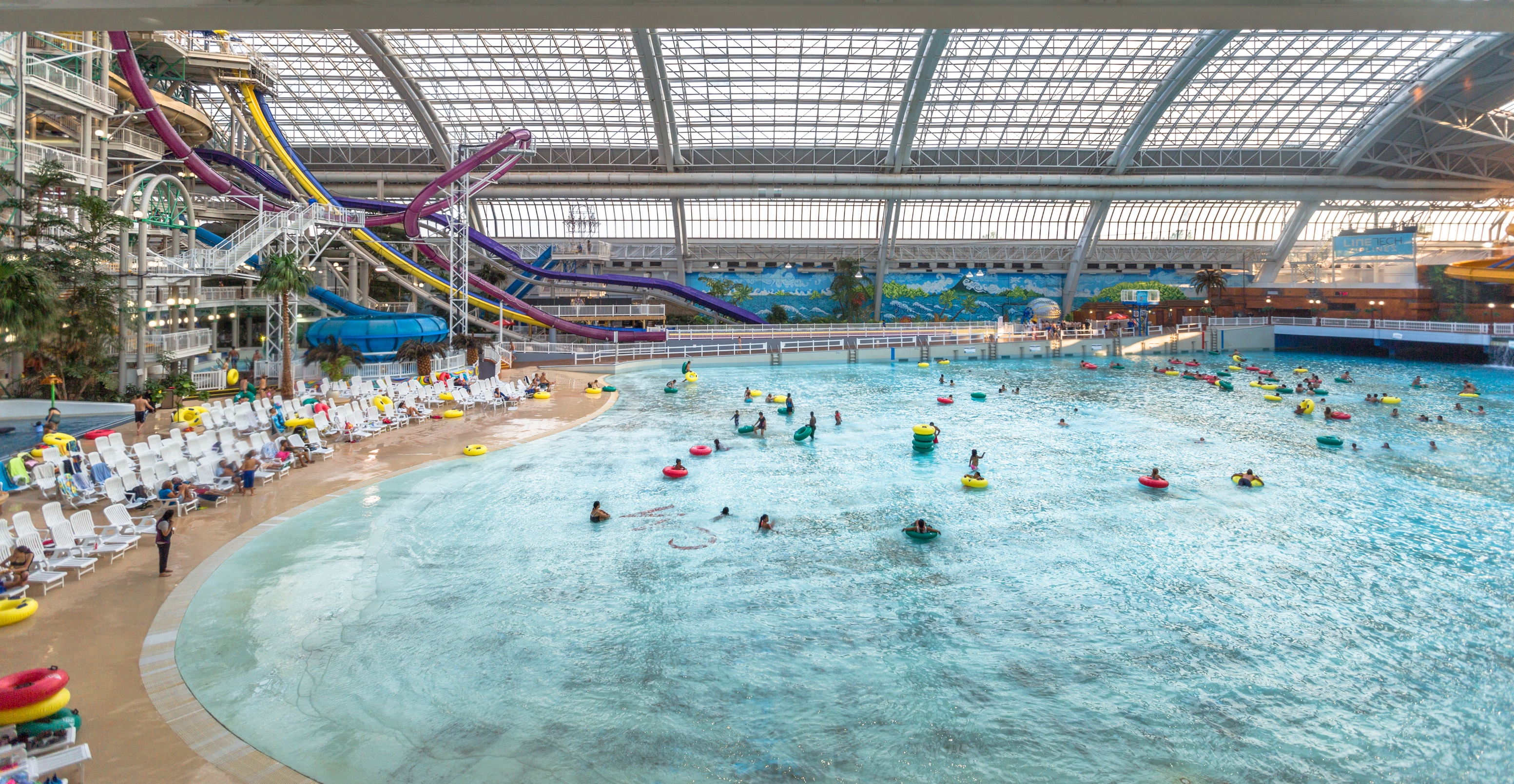
Main wavepool, 2 August 2014.

The World Waterpark is the world's 4th-largest indoor waterpark, built in 1985, with a size of 20,903 square metres (5.165 acres). The park has the world's largest indoor wave pool. The highest slides in the park are the Twister and Cyclone, which are each 25.3 metres (83 ft) high.

The wave pool has six wave bays, each with two panels with a total of 1.1 megawatts (1,500 hp), generating waves up to two metres high.

In 2018–2019, the waterpark underwent a $2.5 million renovation. The renovations included new paint jobs to the Corkscrew slide, the handrails, and the Blue Thunder Wave Pool. Bathrooms were introduced to a more convenient location, as well as a rooftop balcony on top of the bathrooms for social gatherings. A hot dog stand, Tiki Dog, was added.

=== Ice Palace ===
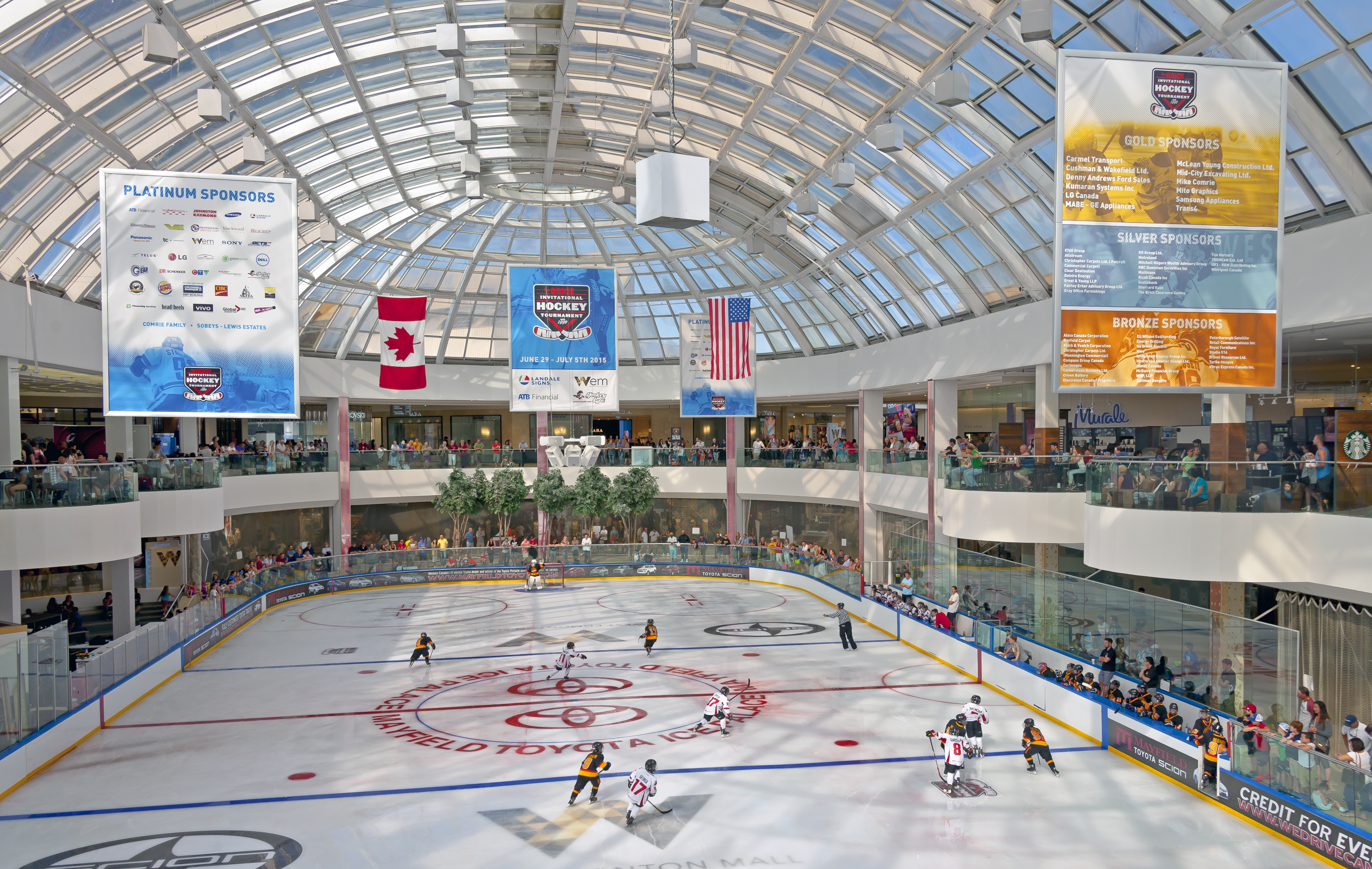
Ice Palace

Ice Palace is a scaled-down version of a National Hockey League (NHL) regulation-sized ice rink in the centre of the mall. The Edmonton Oilers occasionally practised at the Ice Palace during the 1980s. The Oilers' contract for using the rink has since expired. The rink is used for various hockey and other sporting tournaments. Each summer the Ice Palace is host to the Brick Invitational Hockey Tournament, featuring top hockey players aged 10 and under from across North America. Multiple future NHL stars have played in the tournament, including Mathew Barzal, Cole Caufield, Mitch Marner, Macklin Celebrini, among others. In 2015, the Ice Palace was renamed Mayfield Toyota Ice Palace after the mall sold the naming rights to a local auto dealership. However, after a couple of years as well as the dealership moving to WEM in 2021, the Ice Palace was reverted to its original name.

During special events, such as Remembrance Day, the ice rink is covered for ceremonies. In July 2017, West Edmonton Mall announced that the Ice Palace would get a $3 million renovation. It closed for the summer and reopened in December 2017.

=== Mini Golf ===
==== Professor WEM's Adventure Golf ====
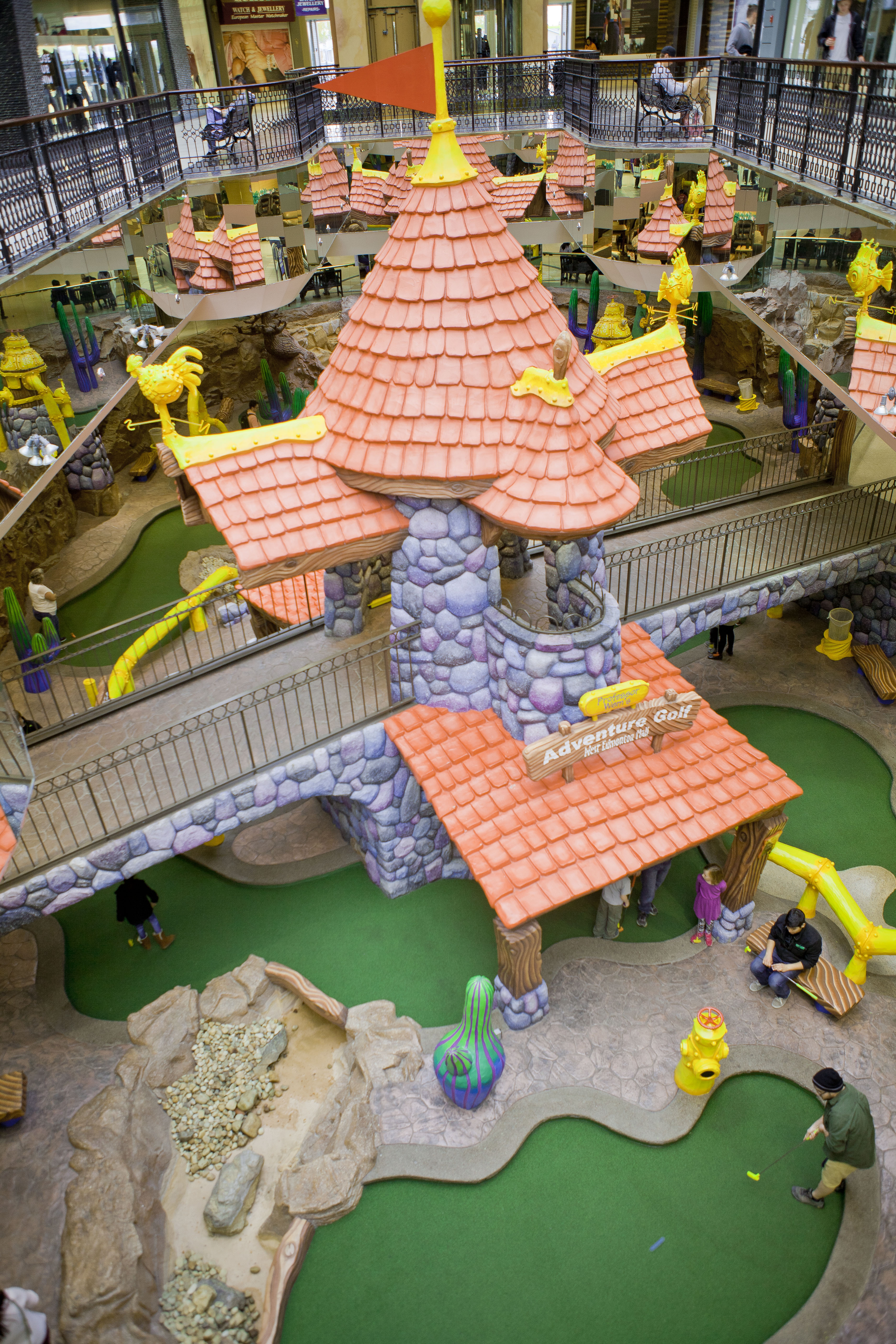
Professor WEM's Adventure Golf viewed from top floor, 12 October 2015

Professor WEM's Adventure Golf is an 18-hole miniature golf course. The miniature golf course was originally known as Pebble Beach Mini Golf and was designed to be a mini golf version of Pebble Beach Golf Links. The course was refurbished and given the Professor WEM theme in the mid-1990s.

==== Dragon's Tale Black-lit Mini Golf ====
Is near Galaxyland Powered by Hasbro, along with the Crystal Labyrinth Mirror Maze.

=== Marine Life ===
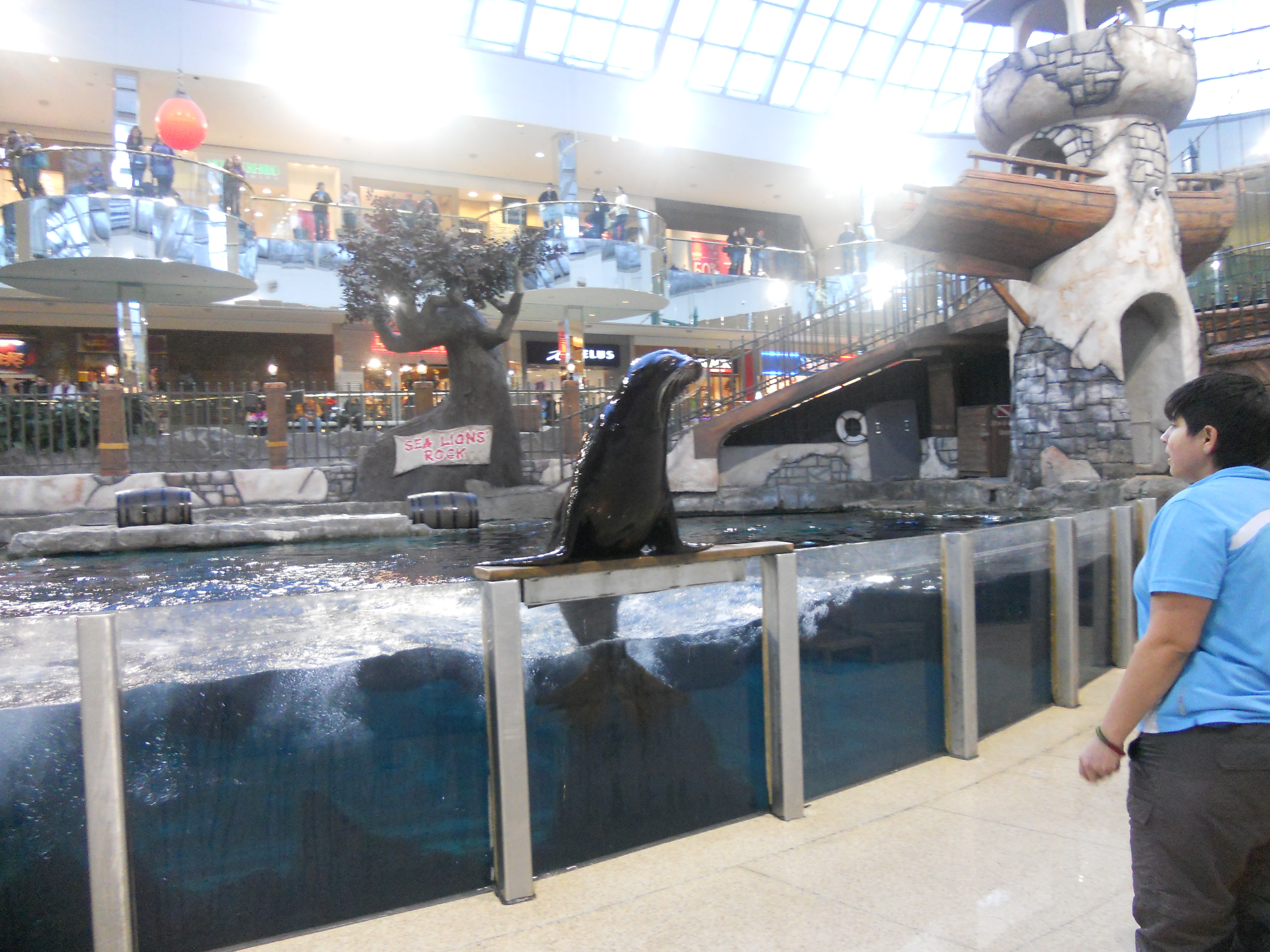
The Sea Lions Rock show at WEM in 2012

From 1985 to 2005 a Deep Sea adventure ride took visitors on a narrated tour of the lake in one of four submarines. The submarines have now been removed but guests can still visit the Sea Life Caverns at Marine Life — an underground aquarium that is home to more than 100 species of fish, sharks, sea turtles, penguins, reptiles, amphibians and invertebrates—or watch the free daily sea lion shows.

=== Other attractions ===
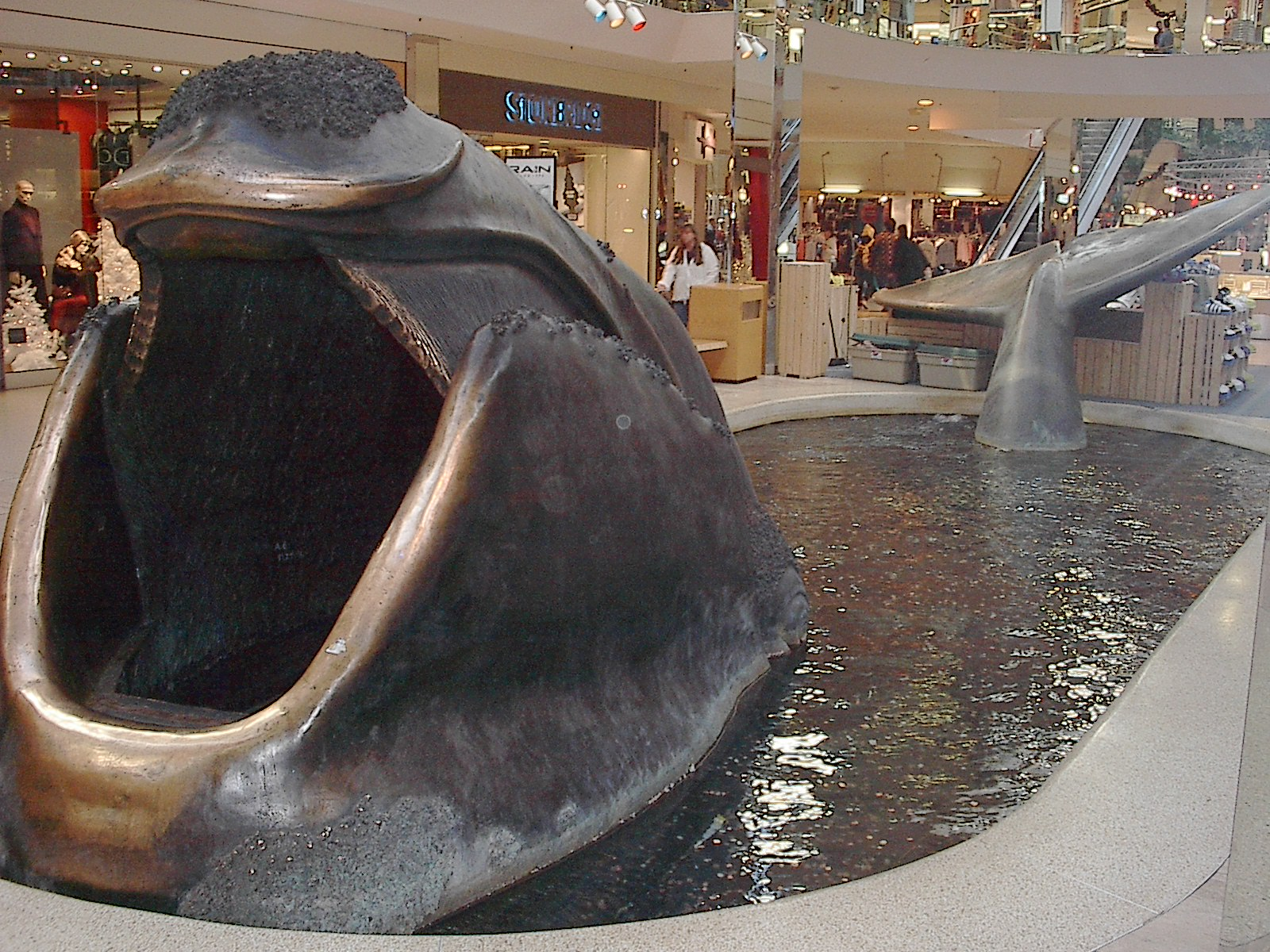
Open Sea, a bronze whale by Robin Bell, in its original location before it moved to outside of the now-defunct Sears Canada and now the Winners/HomeSense, and removed the water surrounding it, November 27, 2005. This sculpture is a statue of two North Atlantic right whales.

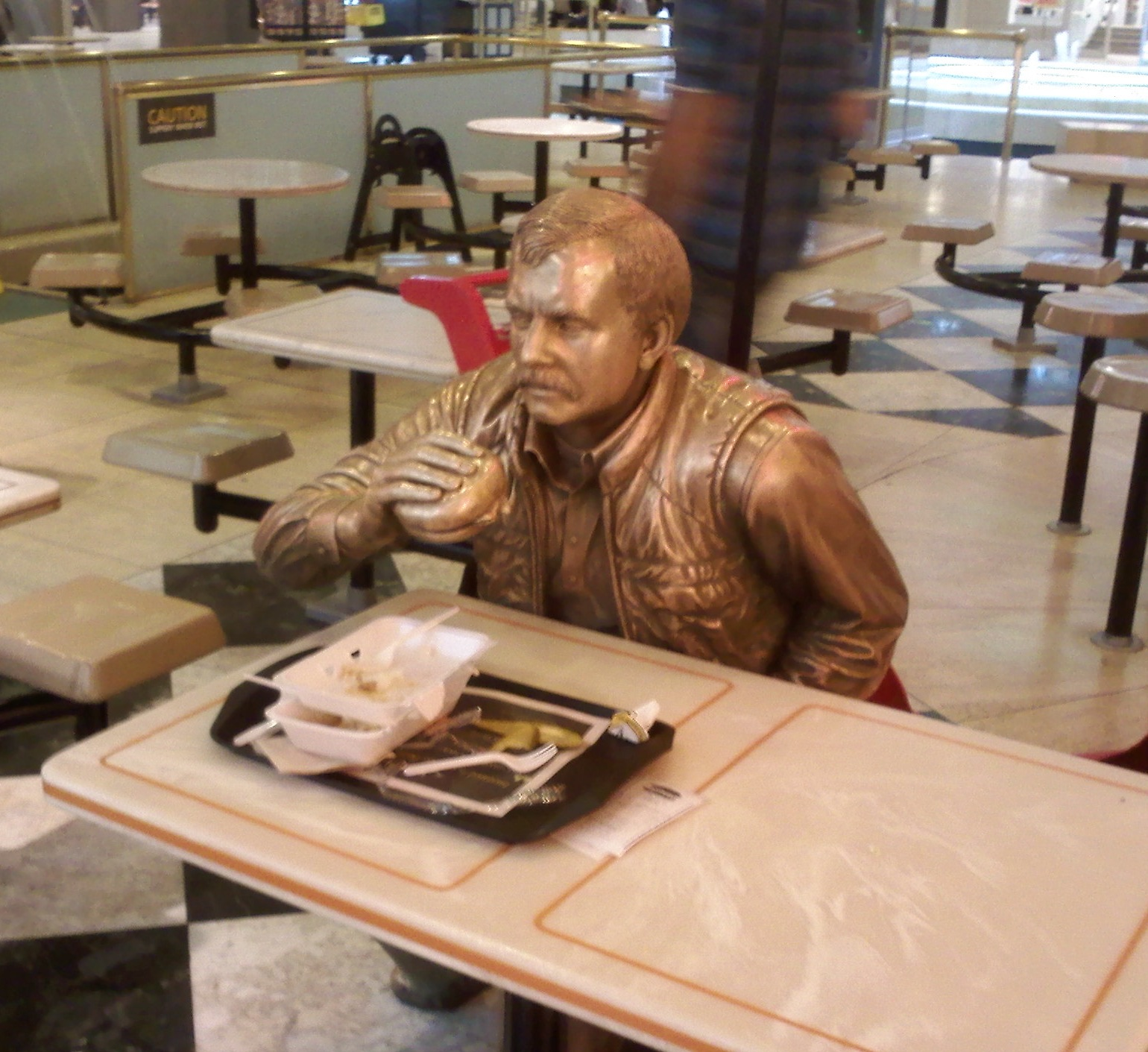
The brass man, originally from Bourbon Street, in the phase III food court, 1 November 2010. Now, he sits in the Phase I court.

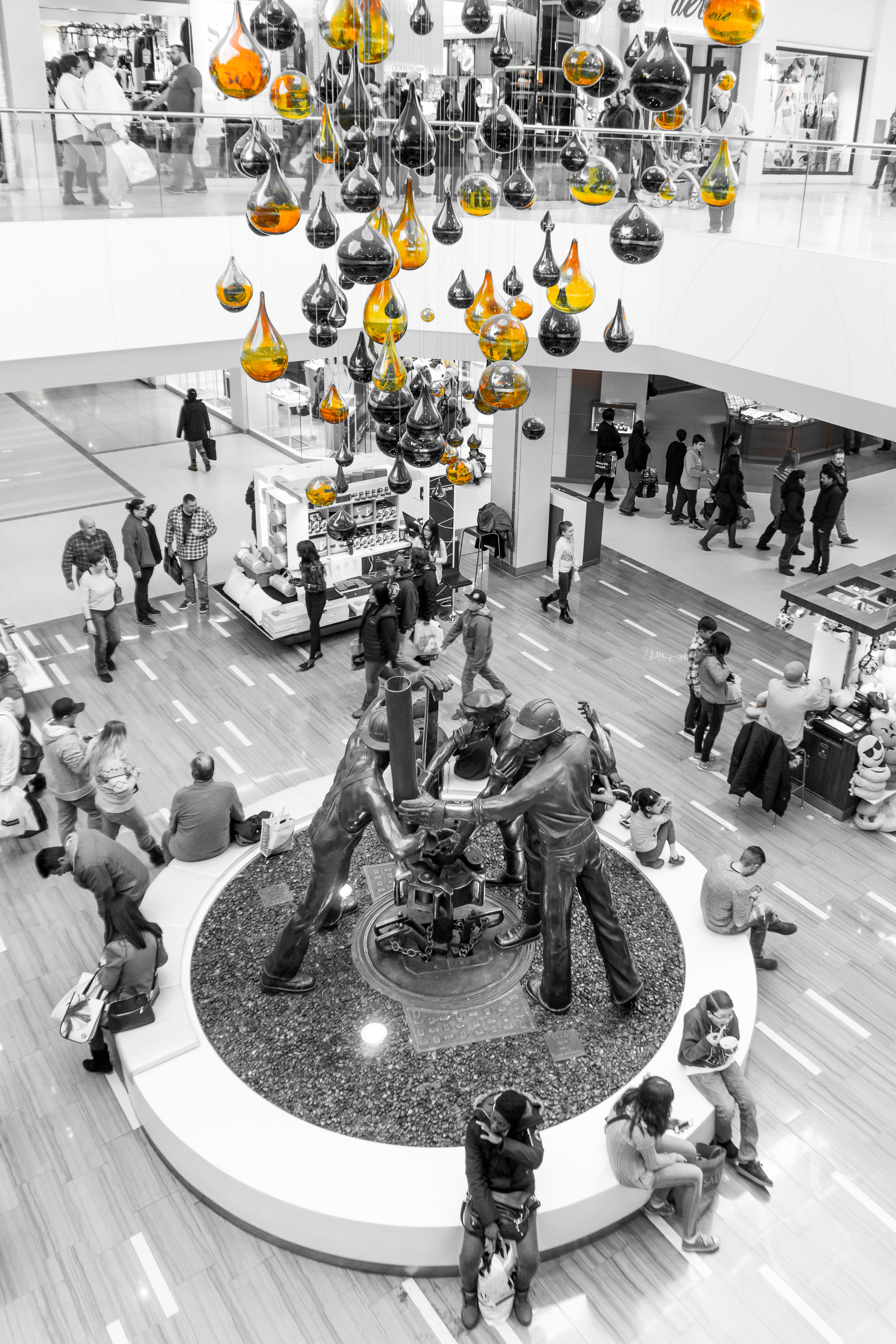
Running In oil workers statue by Robin Bell, 2 January 2016

- Fantasyland Hotel, located within the mall; WEM is also affiliated with a second hotel, the West Edmonton Mall Inn, across the street from the shopping centre on 90th Avenue.
- An indoor shooting range (named "Wild West Shooting Centre")
- Large-scale replica of the Santa María, one of the ships sailed by Christopher Columbus in 1492 to San Salvador Island. The deck can be booked for private functions.
- 24-hour Gym, Crunch Fitness
- Infinity Experiences, an immersive virtual-reality experiences featuring "Horizon of Khufu: Journey in Ancient Egypt" focusing on the Pyramids of Giza, and "Life Chronicles" centered around the exploration of evolutionary periods and the living organisms inhabiting the planet.
- Dinner Theatre: Jubilations Dinner Theatre offers original Canadian three-act musical comedies along with a four-course dinner. Full bar service is available and the theatre's productions run Wednesday to Sunday. This space was formerly a Famous Players cinema.
- Previously, the mall has had a history of nightclubs and recreation spaces including the Empire Ballroom, Edmonton Events Centre (demolished in December 2013), The Joint, Rum Jungle, and Ka'os Nightclub. The former Edmonton Events Centre space was purchased by Gateway Casinos & Entertainment for their expansion of the Palace Casino, which was renamed to Starlight Casino. (Phase II)
- The Rec Room
- A West 49 skate shop, built on the 1st floor in Phase II, in a former Cineplex Odeon theatre, with an indoor skatepark in the basement then moved to the former Sears 1st floor temporarily, when DRIVE Go Karts moved in, then moving to various store spaces, currently West49's location is in a combo store with Bluenotes near the Ice Palace. (Phase II)
- The mall has also previously had an Edmonton Police Service station and an inter-denominational chapel called West Edmonton Christian Assembly (WECA). (Phase III)
- Four radio stations: 97.3 K-Rock (classic rock), 840 CFCW (classic country and news programming), Sports 1440 (sports talk), 96.3 The Breeze (soft adult contemporary), are owned by Stingray Radio. The Stingray-owned area features studios, offices, and a small free museum. Stingray studios are in Phase IV, with the broadcast studios visible from the mall (illuminated "on air" signs indicate when broadcasts are underway from those studios).

==== Themed streets ====
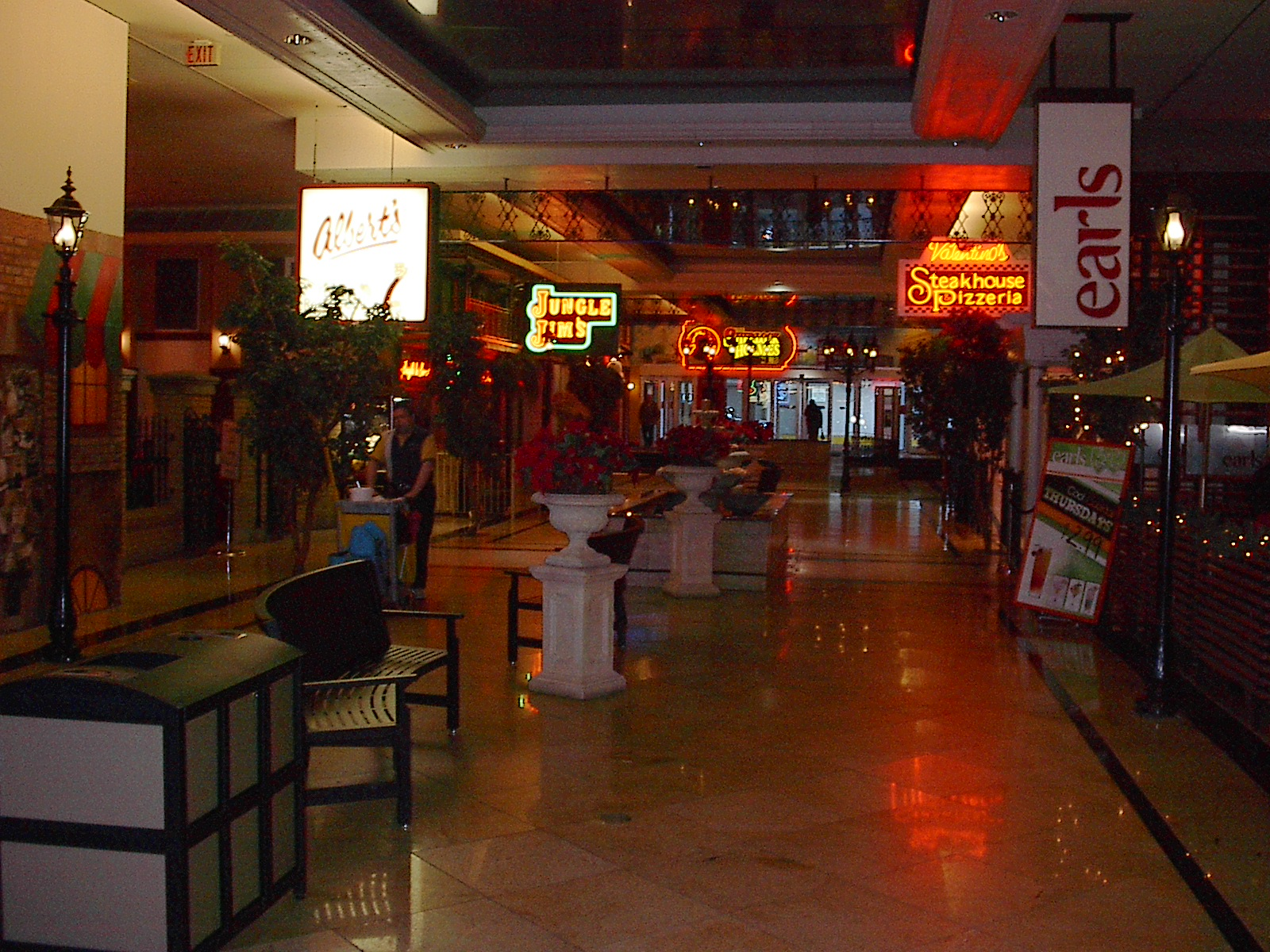
Bourbon Street before it was refurbished, 27 November 2005.

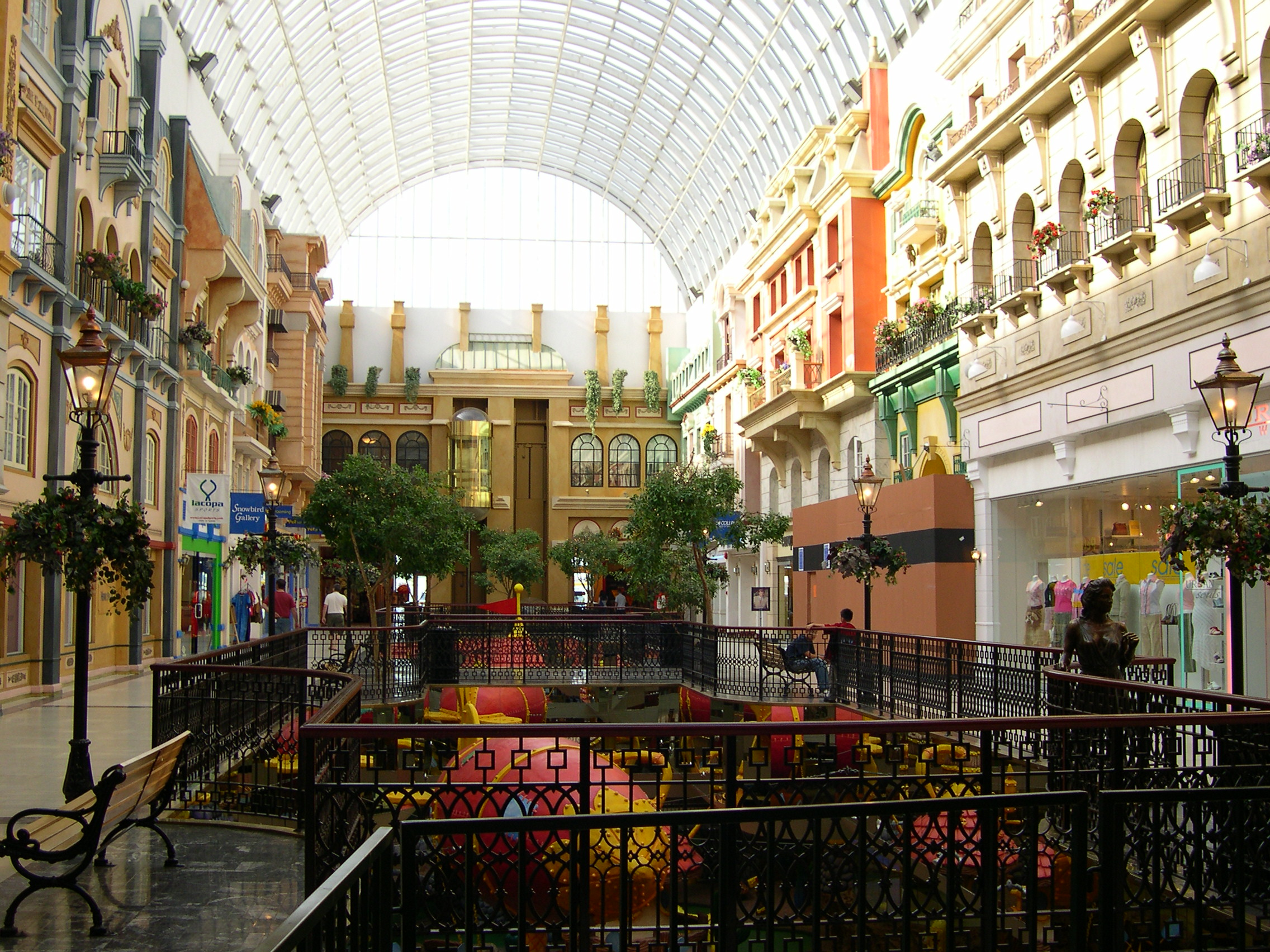
Europa Boulevard on 17 June 2003, nine years before La Maison Simons moved in.

The mall also includes several theme areas including:

- BRBN st. (Bourbon Street): Features clubs and restaurants in a New Orleans-influenced setting. Several restaurants and clubs are here including 1st Rnd, Bag O' Crab, Boston Pizza, Brewco, Earls, Five & Dive, Japanese Village, Mai Vietnamese Fusion, Mogouyan Hand-Pulled Noodle, Marble Slab Creamery, Q Tea, The Taco Shop, Moxies, Mr. Mikes, The Old Spaghetti Factory, and Rick Bronson's The Comic Strip. The lighting in this area is left dim to simulate a nighttime atmosphere. The area can be closed off from the rest of the mall, allowing for the hosting of special events, and for its establishments to stay open past the closing time of the rest of the mall. As part of the 2011–2014 mall renovations, this area was renovated and Bourbon Street was renamed Brbn St.
- Europa Boulevard: Eclectic shops in an area designed to look like a European streetscape. It is home to Opulence, Aztec Gold, Nagaiki Ramen, Shoo Loong Kan, Stitch It, Dr. Martens, Kawaii Alley, Yoyoso, FYidoctors, Untuckit, and several rentable conference rooms that look down on the Boulevard. Also, Europa Boulevard is home to the first La Maison Simons to open outside Quebec.
- Chinatown: Asian-themed area anchored by a T & T Supermarket (in the former Canadian Tire location). It is directly above Bourbon Street. The Chinatown signage was removed in May 2012 and the section, though it still maintains an Asian décor, is no longer exclusive to such businesses.
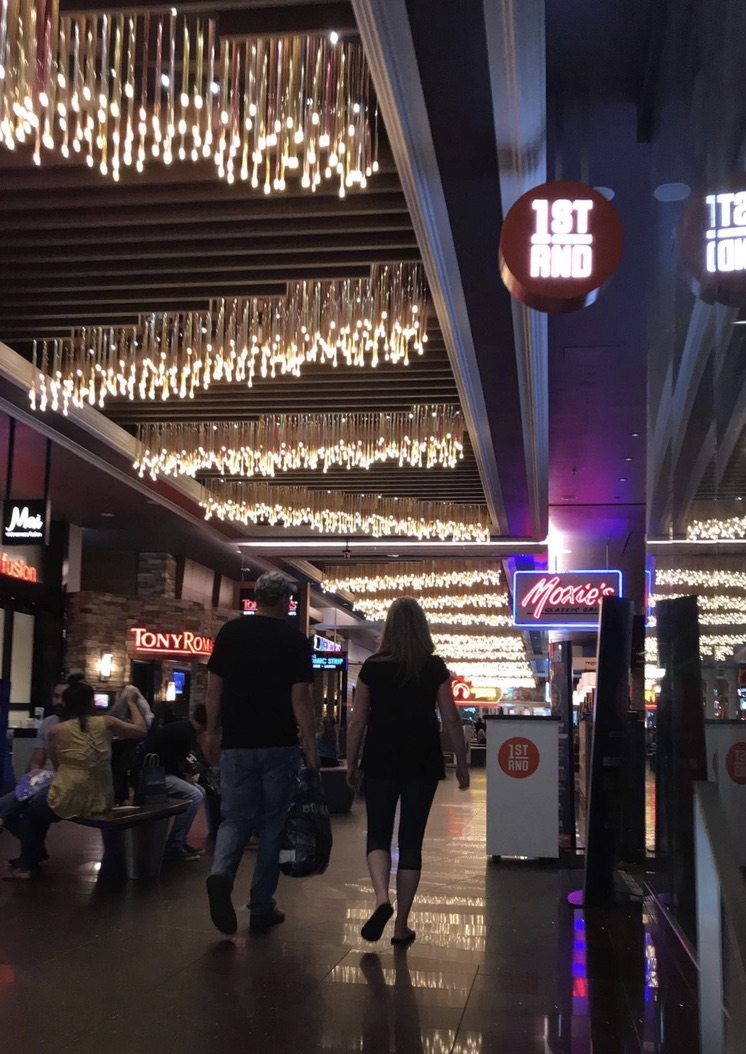
BRBN st. at West Edmonton Mall, September 10, 2018

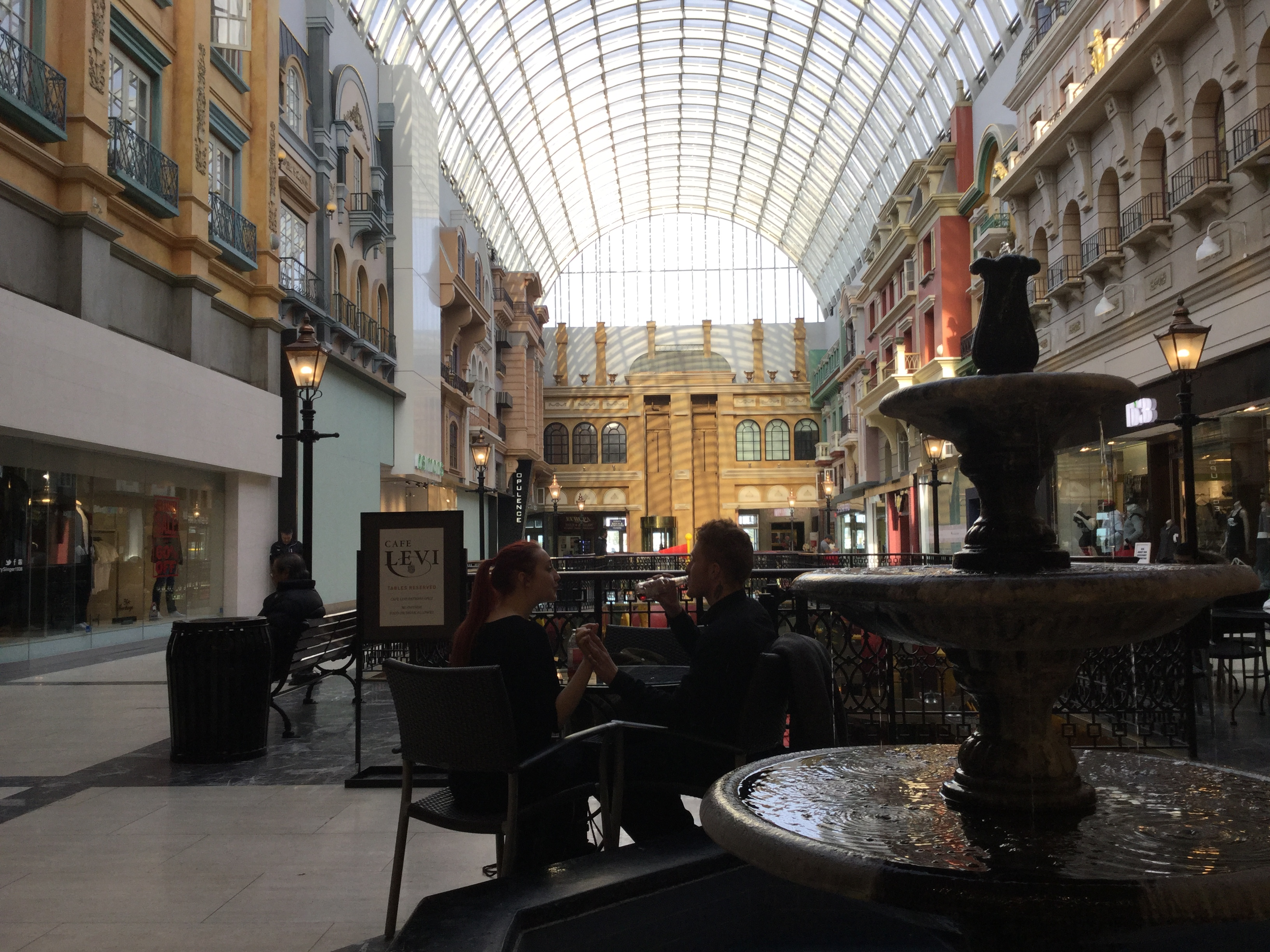
Europa Boulevard, February 2, 2017

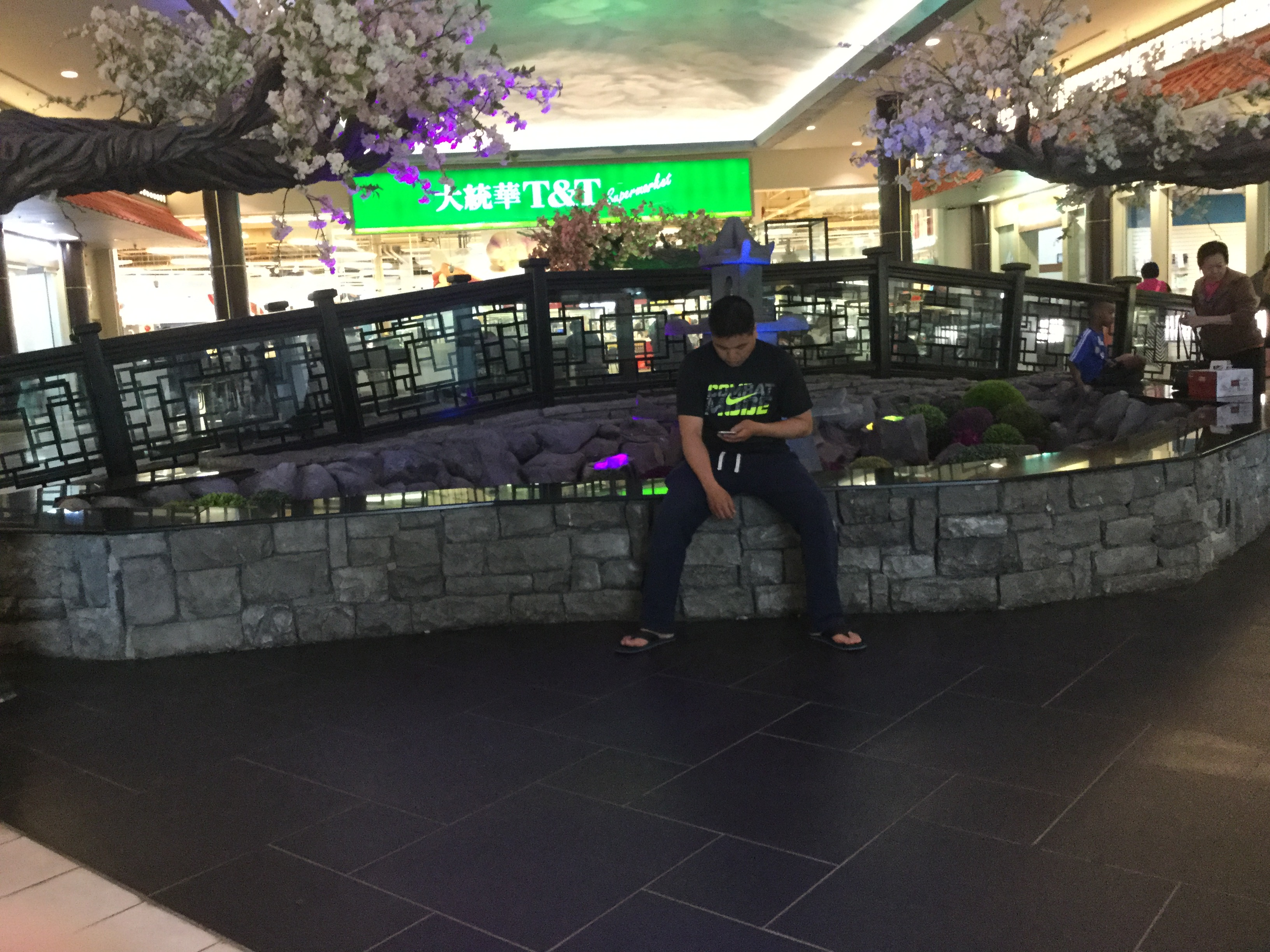
Chinatown, June 8, 2017

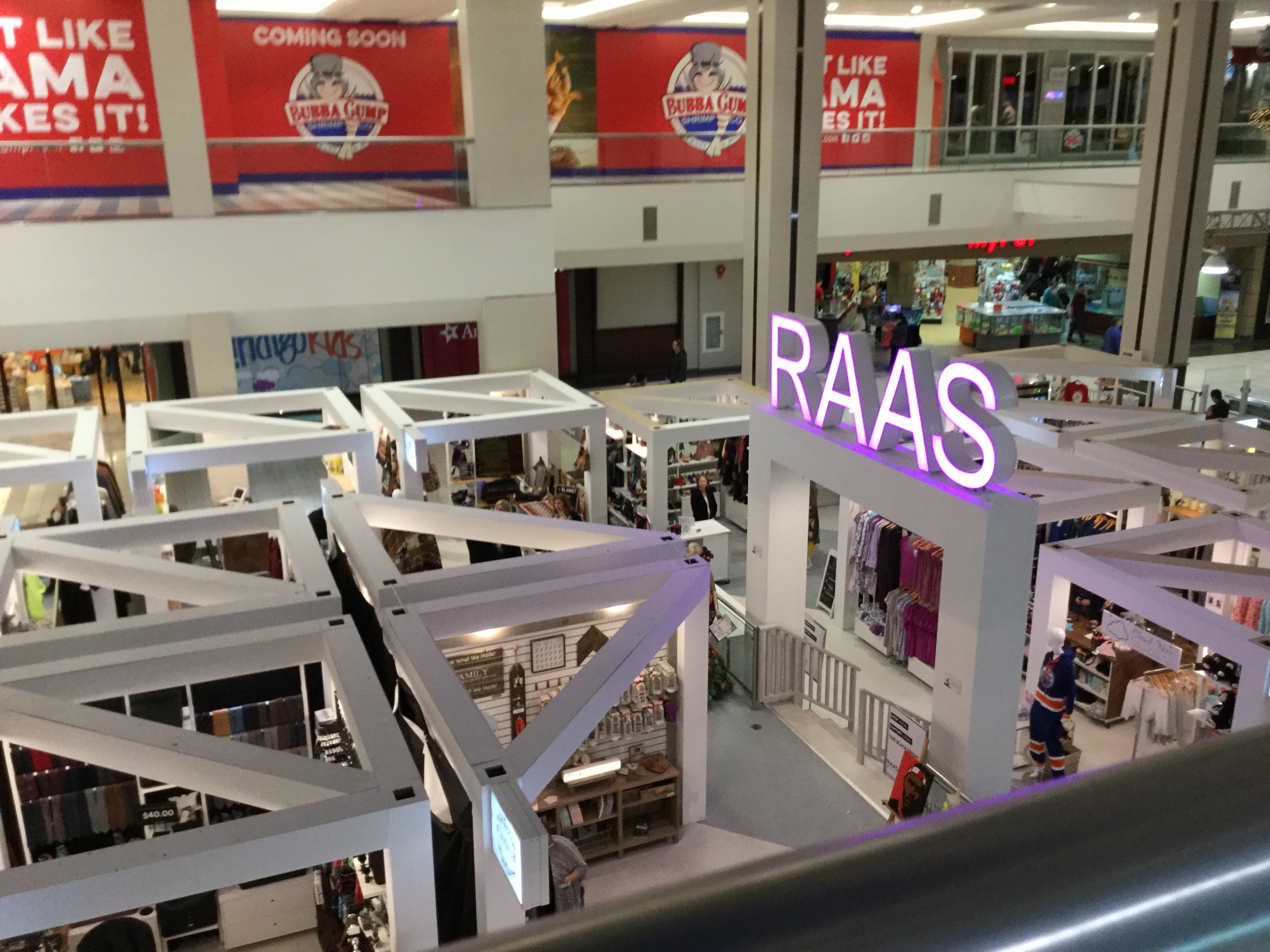
RAAS, short for "retail as a service" (operating 2017–2018) in Phase IV of West Edmonton Mall, November 27, 2017.

== In popular culture ==
The mall is featured prominently in the movies Christmas in Wonderland and Paper Marriage, and is featured briefly in FUBAR 2 and partially prominently in Before I Change My Mind. The mall setting in the animated TV series 6teen is also based on West Edmonton Mall, as well as the Toronto Eaton Centre.

== Future developments ==
In 2002, the City of Edmonton approved plans for the mall to expand with an additional 30,000 square metres (320,000 sq ft) of retail space, a facility for sports, trade shows and conventions, a 12-storey office building, and a 600-unit apartment building, along with more parking. However, none of these projects has begun construction except for the completed parking lot expansion by the Rec Room.

As part of Mayfield Toyota's move to the mall, the project is yet to include the addition of a 19,000 m^{2} (200,000 sq ft) parkade with 1,000 parking stalls and valet service.

== Security ==
In February 2015, the jihadist terrorist group al-Shabaab released a propaganda video calling for attacks on West Edmonton Mall and other Western shopping centres. Although the group had hitherto never launched attacks in North America, security at the mall was tightened in response. The Royal Canadian Mounted Police also indicated that there was no evidence of any imminent threat.

In response to growing security threats, West Edmonton Mall developed a lockdown protocol in case of major emergencies. As of 2013 drills continued to be executed every two to three months.

On 21 August 2023, the mall was locked down after three men were seriously injured in a targeted shooting near the mall's movie theatre.

The mall was locked down again on 2 December 2023 when a man was spotted with a gun. No shots were fired, and no injuries were reported.

On 29 January 2026, the mall was locked down after a gun was fired near BRBN ST. The mall remained locked down for an hour, and no injuries were reported.

=== Controversies ===
In 2011, a video recording allegedly showed WEM security assaulting a woman after arresting her for trespassing. A judge agreed to release the video after charges against the woman were dismissed.

== West Edmonton Mall Transit Centre ==
West Edmonton Mall Transit Centre

General information
- Owner: City of Edmonton
- Platforms: 13 bus bays

Construction
- Cycle facilities: Yes
- Accessible: Yes

Other information
- Website: West Edmonton Mall Transit Centre

History
- Opened: 1981
- Rebuilt: 2021–2026/27
- Former names: West Jasper Place Transit Centre
Location

The West Edmonton Mall Transit Centre is a major hub of the Edmonton Transit Service (ETS). As of August 2021, it is in a temporary location on 90 Avenue beside the West Edmonton Mall Inn. This is due to the construction of the LRT system's Valley Line West elevated station.

The permanent transit centre is on the south side of West Edmonton Mall, outside mall entrance 48. Buses using the transit centre enter and exit from 87 Avenue. The large shelter building at the transit centre is accessible and equipped with power doors. This transit centre has vending machines and a payphone but no park and ride, public washrooms, or drop-off area. The transit centre is served by ETS and St. Albert Transit.

$3 million in upgrades to the transit centre were completed in June 2017 and included a new heated indoor shelter (double the size of the previous shelter), new sidewalks, new lighting, and a new public art installation, among other changes.

The following bus routes serve the transit centre:

To/from	Routes	
Bonnie Doon	4	ETS
Capilano Transit Centre	4	ETS
Century Park Transit Centre	56	ETS
Clareview Transit Centre	54	ETS
Donsdale	913	ETS
Downtown	2, 7, 900X	ETS
Edmonton Valley Zoo	ODT	ETS
The Grange	916, 917	ETS
The Hamptons	916, 917	ETS
Stadium Transit Centre	2	ETS
Jasper Place Transit Centre	52, 914, 915, 925	ETS
Leger Transit Centre	56	ETS
Lessard	916, 918A/B	ETS
Lewis Farms Transit Centre	4, 900X, 916, 917, 920X	ETS
Lymburn	917	ETS
MacEwan University	7	ETS
Meadows Transit Centre	55, 56	ETS
Mill Woods Transit Centre	56	ETS
Northgate Transit Centre	52, 54	ETS
North-West Industrial	54, 906, 907	ETS
South Campus/Fort Edmonton Park Transit Centre	4	ETS
Southgate Transit Centre	55	ETS
Stadium Transit Centre	2	ETS
St. Albert Nakî Transit Centre	205	StAT
University Transit Centre	4, 920X	ETS
Wedgewood Heights	913	ETS
Westmount Transit Centre	52, 904, 906, 907	ETS
Westridge	923	ETS
White Industrial	906	ETS
Whyte Ave	4	ETS

== See also ==
- List of shopping malls in Canada
- List of largest enclosed shopping malls in Canada
- List of largest shopping malls in the world
