= Miz =

The Miz, ring name of Mike Mizanin (born 1980) is an American professional wrestler

Miz or the Miz may refer to:

- Miz (singer) (Mizuki Watanabe, born 1981), Japanese singer and actress
- The Miz, nickname of Steve Mizerak (1944–2006), an American professional pool player
- The Miz, nickname of Jacob Misiorowski (born 2002), an American professional baseball pitcher
- Ms., usually pronounced /ˈmɪz/ ("Miz"), an English-language honorific for women regardless of marital status
- Miz Cracker (born 1984), American drag queen
- Mizoram, a state in northeastern India (postal code)
- University of Missouri, also known as "Mizzou" or "MIZ"

== See also ==
- MS (disambiguation)
- Mrs. (disambiguation)
- Miss (disambiguation)
- MIS (disambiguation)
- Mistress (disambiguation)
- Missus (disambiguation)
- Les Misérables (musical), colloquially known as Les Miz
