= KKE (disambiguation) =

KKE is the Communist Party of Greece (Greek: Kommounistikó Kómma Elládas).

KKE may also refer to:

- KKE Interior
- KKE (m-l)
- M-L KKE
- KKE Architects, a former architecture firm in the United States
- Añorga KKE, a sports and culture club in Spain
- Kakabe language of Guinea (ISO code: kke)
- KKE, the IATA code for the Kerikeri Airport in New Zealand
