= Missis =

Missis may refer to:

- Missis or Misis, the previous name of Yakapınar, which in the past was the place of the ancient city of Mopsuestia
- Missis, a dog from The Hundred and One Dalmatians

== See also ==
- Missus (disambiguation)
