= Misses (disambiguation) =

Misses is the plural of an English-language honorific.

Misses may also refer to:

- Misses (Joni Mitchell album)
- Misses (My America Is Watching Tigers Die album)

== See also ==
- Miss (disambiguation)
- Missus (disambiguation)
