= MYZ =

MYZ may refer to:

- Monkey Bay Airport, Malawi, IATA airport code MYZ
- Mandaic language, a variety of Aramaic, ISO 639 language code myz

== See also ==
- Miz (disambiguation)
