= MRS =

MRS, mrs, or Mrs may refer to:

== Abbreviations ==
- Magnetic resonance spectroscopy, a laboratory technique
- Mammography reporting software, used to manage data related to radiologist interpretation of mammographic images
- Mandibular repositioning splint
- Marginal rate of substitution, in economics
- Maritime Reaction Squadron, a unit of the South African Navy
- Market Research Society
- Postal code for Marsa, Malta
- IATA code for Marseille Provence Airport
- ICAO code for Air Marshall Islands, an airline based in Majuro, Marshall Islands
- Materials Research Society
- Medical Research Society
- Melbourne Rectangular Stadium
- Minimal recursion semantics
- Modified Rankin Scale, to measure disability after stroke
- Station code for Monks Risborough railway station, England
- Sandinista Renovation Movement (Spanish: Movimiento Renovador Sandinista), a political party in Nicaragua
- MRS Logística, a freight rail company in Brazil
- MRS suit, breathing apparatus, see Siebe Gorman rebreather equipments
- Molecular Recognition Section as a Drug prefix, e.g. MRS5698.
- MRS agar, a bacterial growth medium for Lactobacilli

== Other uses ==
- Mrs., an honorific title for married women
- SQL Server Reporting Services, a Microsoft Reporting Services computer technology to create data reports
- mrs, abbreviation for maravedis (monetary unit or coin)
- (As Mrş) an abbreviation for Mareşal, the highest rank in the Army of Turkey
- M. Rs., pen-name of Swedish writer Mathilda Roos (1852-1908)
- The Mrs, an American pop-rock band
- MRS degree, a slang term for a young woman who attends college or university for the purpose of finding a spouse.
- Maragus language, an ISO 639-3 code

== See also ==
- Missus (disambiguation)
- Miss (disambiguation)
- MR (disambiguation)
- MS (disambiguation)
