= The Mrs =

American pop-rock band

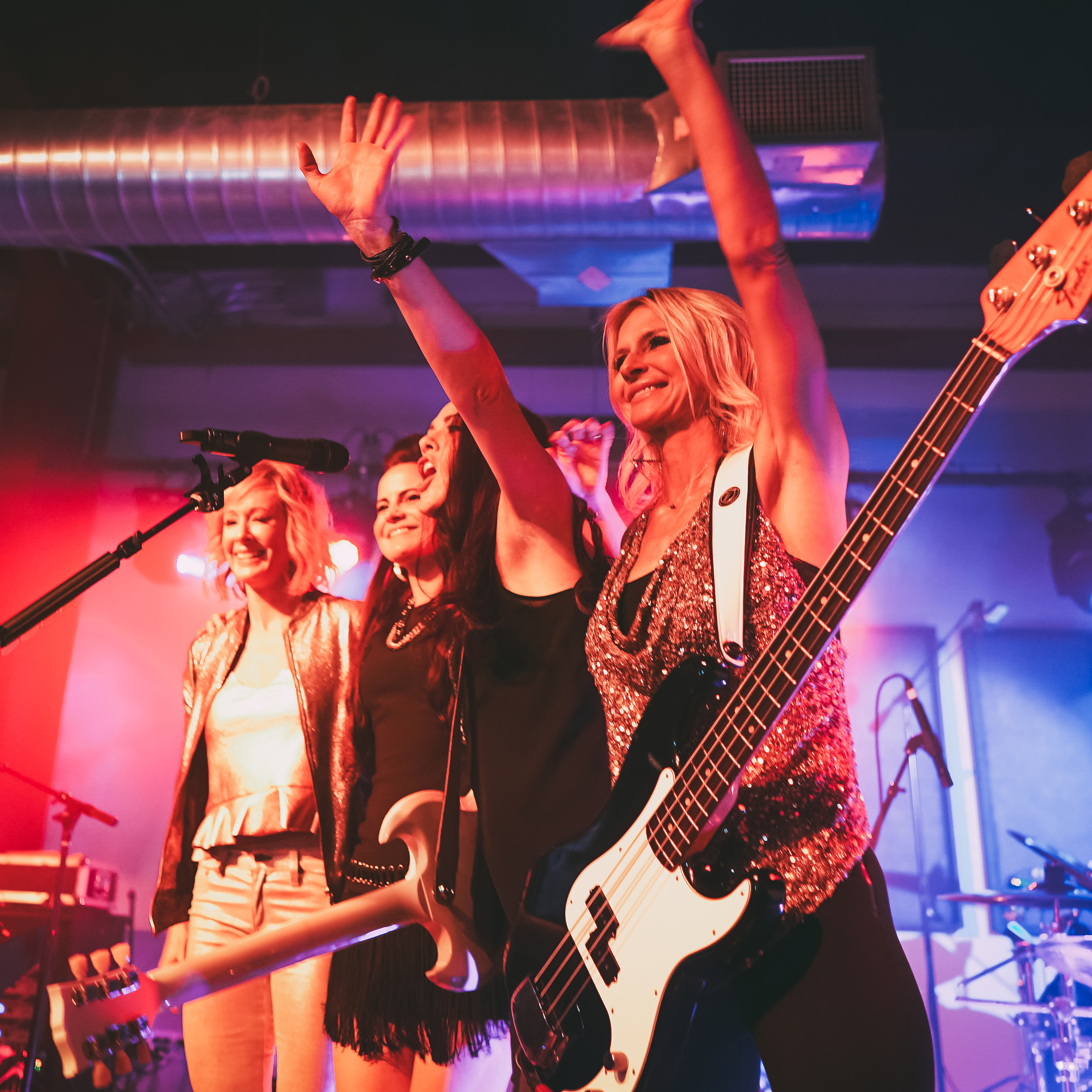

Background information
- Origin: Austin, TX
- Genres: pop rock
- Label: JL Entertainment
- Members: Andra Liemandt, Jenny Mason, Larissa Ness, Mandy Prater
- Past members: Jennifer Zavaleta

The Mrs is an American pop-rock band based in Austin, Texas. Founded by drummer Andra Liemandt with longtime friend Jenny Mason (bass) as the first recruited member, the band took form in July 2013 after a nationwide search of websites and social media for musicians. Eventually, the pair found what they were looking for in their own backyard of Austin, in solo artists Larissa Ness (keyboards/vocals) and Mandy Prater (guitar/vocals).

The band first gained attention in 2014 with their "Magic Mirror" video, which featured their first single, "Enough." In the video, strangers approach a mirror in an Austin mall, and are challenged to view themselves as others see them, instead of listening to their own critical self talk. The emotional video became a viral success, accruing over 5 million views on YouTube. It was featured on Good Morning America, The Queen Latifah Show, local TV and radio, and countless blogs; it was also translated by fans into multiple languages. The Mrs' Magic Mirror was taken on tour around Texas and to Los Angeles, Minneapolis, New York, and was made into an iPhone app.

The popularity of the “Magic Mirror” video pushed "Enough" onto the charts after its official release, in August 2015. In November 2015, after the release of the Enough EP (dated Sep 23, 2015), the title track reached Number 10 on FMQB Adult Contemporary Top 200. During this period, it was one of the most added tracks in independent radio station playlists.

Following Enough, the band partnered with SAFE, an Austin-based nonprofit working to end sexual assault and exploitation, child abuse, and domestic violence, to release "Draw the Line" and drive awareness during Sexual Assault Awareness Month in April 2016.

On March 10, 2017, the band released their first full-length, self-titled album, The Mrs, consisting of eleven tracks. And EP, Five Minutes, was released on September 7, 2018.

== Collaborations ==
The early days of The Mrs were spent under the tutelage of Grammy-award winning engineer/producer/songwriter/musician Robert Arbittier, who made his career working with Stevie Wonder as a touring keyboardist and programmer, and whose songwriting and producing credits include such names as Michael Jackson and Whitney Houston. Arbittier and business partner Gary Odante (engineer, Songs in the Key of Life, ”Gary Olazabal”) were the production team for The Mrs' early singles and the Enough EP. Arbittier also at times served as musical director and manager for the band. The band co-wrote their hit single “Enough” with Arbittier, as well as an unreleased song, “You Were There.”

From 2013 to 2016 The Mrs worked with many Platinum and Grammy-award winning songwriters:

- Weeks after forming, in August 2013, the band met with British songwriter Pam Sheyne, best known for co-writing Christina Aguilera's Grammy Award-winning single, "Genie in a Bottle." Three songs from this writing session were penned at Steven Tyler's oceanside Maui retreat: "The Mrs," "Tug of Love," and "Between the Sheets.”
- “You Told Me” was written with L.A.-based, husband-wife songwriting team, Joerg Kohring and Jessica Niven-Kohring.
- The 2016 single “Light it Up” was co-written by musician Wes Cunningham and acclaimed song-writer Rob Arbittier. Rob has worked with a diverse group of artists, including Michael Jackson, Stevie Wonder, Whitney Houston, Stevie Ray Vaughan, and Jennifer Lopez.
- The band called upon singer/songwriter Susan Gibson, writer of the Dixie Chicks hit "Wide Open Spaces,” to help them approach the task of writing a song of hope for people who have suffered from domestic violence and sexual assault. The creation of The Mrs’ 2016 single, “Draw the Line,” also involved a partnership with SAFE (then SafePlace and Austin Children’s Shelter). All proceeds from the sale of the single go to benefit SAFE and its programs. This partnership also marked a new collaboration with musical producer Dwight Baker, who produced the song at his Matchbox Studios in Austin.

In 2016, the band pulled in the production team of Jimmy McGorman and Robb Vallier to help create what would become 2017’s full-length album release, The Mrs team spent two weekends in Austin with the band, which resulted in 11 songs written in The Mrs' signature roundtable style. Pre-production began immediately, and the bulk of the recording took place at Arlyn Studios in Austin, over the course of eight days in late March, 2016. The album was mixed by Chris Thompson and mastered by Rueben Coehn.

== Charity work ==
In addition to their cornerstone outreach project, the Magic Mirror, the charity work—both as entertainment and as a sponsor—of The Mrs includes working with organizations such as Stop Abuse for Everyone (SAFE), Hand To Hold, National Eating Disorders Association, Just Keep Livin’ Foundation, Survive 2 Thrive, Seton Breast Cancer Foundation, Dell Children’s Hospital Blood and Cancer Center, Center for Child Protection, The Kindness Campaign, and others.

== Awards and recognitions ==
The Mrs received an official decree from the City of Austin that April 8, 2016, was to be called “Draw the Line Day” in the city. Mayor Steve Adler praised The Mrs for writing their song “Draw the Line,” the purpose of which was to bring awareness to the local organization Stop Abuse For Everyone and its work to eradicate domestic violence and sexual assault.

== Notable performances ==
May 1, 2014 – Charity benefit event for children’s music education charity, Kids In a New Groove, with a lineup featuring Court Yard Hounds (featuring Martie Maguire and Emily Robison of the Dixie Chicks).

July 26, 2014 – Keynote performance and presentation of “Magic Mirror” video at BlogHer 2014 National Conference in San Jose, California.

November 2014 – Texas tour on the road with “Magic Mirror” (various).

February 22, 2015 – Mall of America at the Hard Rock Cafe to kick off the third annual National Eating Disorders Association (NEDA) Walk.

April 29, 2015 – "You Told Me” release party on Top of The Rock, top floor observation deck of Rockefeller Center. Emceed by Jenny McCarthy.

October 15, 2015 – The band plays the Moody Theater, home of the long-running Austin City Limits television show, in a lineup which included The Band Perry, at a charity event for Dell Children’s Hospital.

October 23, 2015 – Fundraiser party during Formula One race weekend, with headliner Snoop Dogg.

April 8, 2016 – The Mrs perform at Austin City Hall to commemorate “Draw the Line Day."

March 12, 2017 – The Mrs perform a set at The Belmont in Austin for Holonis Be Found Party during SXSW Interactive, hosted by Mario Lopez with additional performance by Bow Wow featuring Warren G.

March 18, 2017 – The Mrs perform at Texas Rockfest during SXSW in Austin.

June 16, 2017 – The Mrs perform a sold-out show in the Listening Room at Winflo Osteria in Austin.

October 19, 2017 – The band performs at Concert for Hope and Joy, a benefit for Hurricane Harvey in Katy, Texas.

November 1, 2017 – The Mrs play at the Peppermint Club in West Hollywood.

March 17, 2018 – Hosted and headlined official SXSW Day Party "Kindnesspalooza" at Rio in Austin, featuring local and national acts including Ian Moore.

April 13, 2018 – The Mrs perform at the Mack, Jack & McConaughey (MJ&M) "Jack & Friends" Concert VIP Pre-Party at The W in Austin.

September 8, 2018 – The sold out Five Minutes EP Release Party at Lambert's BBQ in Austin.

== Charts ==
The Mrs’ song “You Told Me” peaked at Number 18 in the FMQB Adult Contemporary Top 200 for the week of June 15, 2015, and was ranked at Number 61 for the FMQB Adult Contemporary Top 100 for the year 2015.

The Mrs’ song “Enough” reached Number 10 on FMQB Adult Contemporary Top 200 for the week of November 23, 2015, and was ranked at Number 54 for the FMQB Adult Contemporary Top 100 for the year 2015.

== Discography ==
=== Singles ===
“What Christmas Means to Me” (cover of the song originally recorded by Stevie Wonder), released as a single on November 2, 2015

"Between the Sheets,” bonus track from Enough EP, was released as a single January 29, 2016

“Enough” remix released February 26, 2016

“You Told Me” single released April 21, 2015

“Enough” single released August 1, 2015

“Draw the Line” April 5, 2016 - co-written with Susan Gibson, well-known for penning the Dixie Chicks hit “Wide Open Spaces”

“Light it Up” released on June 28, 2016

“The Beast,” lead single of the album The Mrs, was released October 14 of 2016

“Blink of An Eye” single released February 10, 2017

"Somewhere To Go" single released July 31, 2017

"Five Minutes" single released June 29, 2018

"Hurricane" single released August 31, 2018

=== Albums ===
Enough EP, released September 23, 2015, by JL Entertainment with tracks:

1. Enough
2. You Told Me
3. The Mrs
4. Retail Therapy, co-written with Kathy Valentine of the Go-Gos
5. Tug of Love

The full-length album, The Mrs, was released on March 10, 2017, by JL Entertainment with tracks:

1. Blink of an Eye
2. Bait N Switch
3. Cravings
4. Dare Me
5. Somewhere to Go
6. And the Band Plays On
7. The Beast
8. Grace
9. Cleaning House
10. Most Likely to Be Me
11. This Is Not a Lullaby

Five Minutes EP, released September 7, 2018, by JL Entertainment and produced by Gavin Jasper and Maika Maille with tracks:

1. Five Minutes
2. My Tribe
3. Brand New
4. Hurricane
5. Same Rock
6. Somewhere To Go
7. Lullaby

== Videography ==
The Mrs’ first video, “Magic Mirror," was released July 17, 2014 and amassed millions of YouTube views. It was directed and produced by Austin-based team The Bear, headed up by Berndt Mader and Ben Steinbauer, responsible for the cult filmWinnebago Man. An accompanying behind-the-scenes documentary video featuring interviews with the band was released the same day.

The video for the song “You Told Me” was released at a Mother’s Day-themed party at Top of the Rock, Rockefeller Center in New York City on April 29, 2015, introduced by actress, model, and comedian Jenny McCarthy. The video was directed by Greg Olliver, a filmmaker whose feature documentary subjects have included rockers Lemmy of Motorhead and Johnny Winter.

In early 2016, the band again enlisted Olliver for the video to the song “Draw the Line,” created to bring awareness to domestic violence.

In early 2017, The Mrs collaborated with Austin, Texas–based Director/Filmmaker Scott Ramsay to create a music video for their song “Blink of an Eye,” a single from their self-titled album. The video was set to be released in an exclusive by People Magazine on May 9, 2017.

Somewhere To Go - January 29, 2018 (added to YouTube 1/25) February 15, 2018, released by Elmore Magazine.

The Mrs music video for "Five Minutes" from the Five Minutes EP - with John Felipo and Gavin Jasper, was released on July 19, 2018.
