= Sea Life at Mall of America =

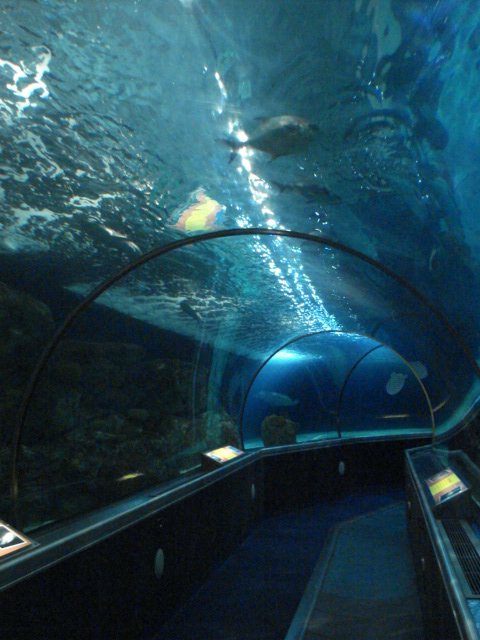
- Shark tunnel at the aquarium
- Interactive map of Sea Life at Mall of America
- 44°51′15″N 93°14′32″W
- Date opened: 1996
- Location: Mall of America, Bloomington, Minnesota, United States
- Land area: 70,000 square feet (6,500 m^{2})
- No. of animals: 10,000+
- Volume of largest tank: 500,000 US gallons (1,900,000 L)
- Total volume of tanks: 1.3 million US gallons (4,900,000 L)
- Public transit: Metro Transit; MVTA; Blue
- Website: www.visitsealife.com/Minnesota

Sea Life at Mall of America (formally known as Sea Life Minnesota Aquarium) is a public aquarium located in the Mall of America in Bloomington, Minnesota, United States. The 1.3 million-US-gallon (4.9 ML) aquarium contains thousands of aquatic creatures, including sea turtles, sharks, sawfish, stingrays, jellyfish and seahorses. There are eleven exhibits featured at the aquarium. The aquarium is highlighted by a 300-foot (91 m) 360° clear acrylic tunnel, which consists of four different areas housing both freshwater and salt water creatures.

== History ==
The aquarium at the Mall of America was opened in 1996 under the name UnderWater World after 18 months of construction. In 2000, the re-opening of the aquarium changed its name to Underwater Adventures Aquarium. In 2008, the aquarium became a part of British-based Merlin Entertainments group of attractions, and was rebranded as a Sea Life Centre in March 2011.

In the summer of 2009, the aquarium debuted the exhibit Seahorse Kingdom.

In March 2010, Jellyfish Discovery was opened as the largest jellyfish exhibit worldwide.

In March 2011, SeaLife officially completed the transition to a Merlin Entertainments' Sea Life Centre, and was renamed Sea Life Minnesota Aquarium. The re-brand featured updated theming throughout the aquarium and many new exhibits.

== Exhibits ==
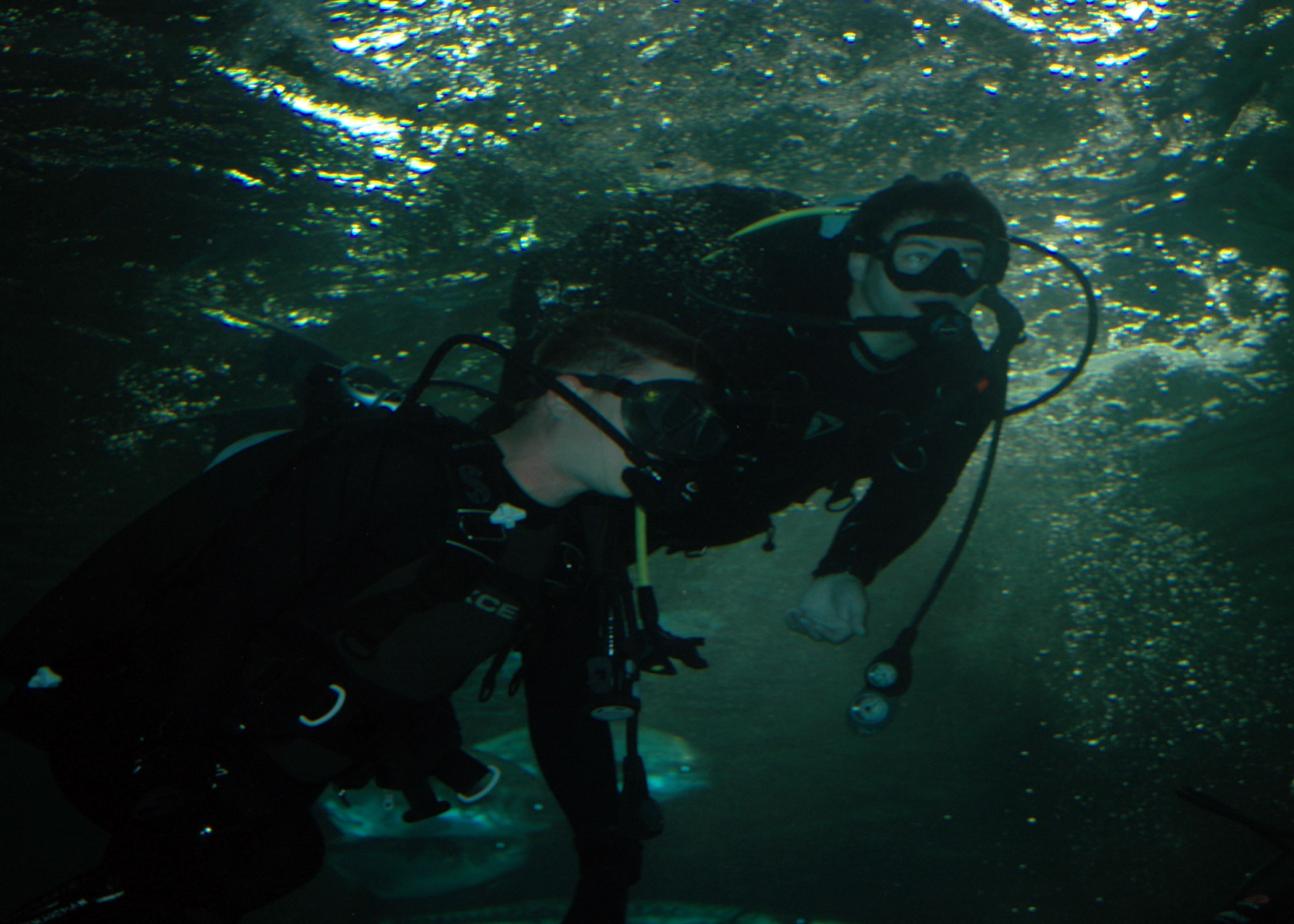
Divers in an exhibit

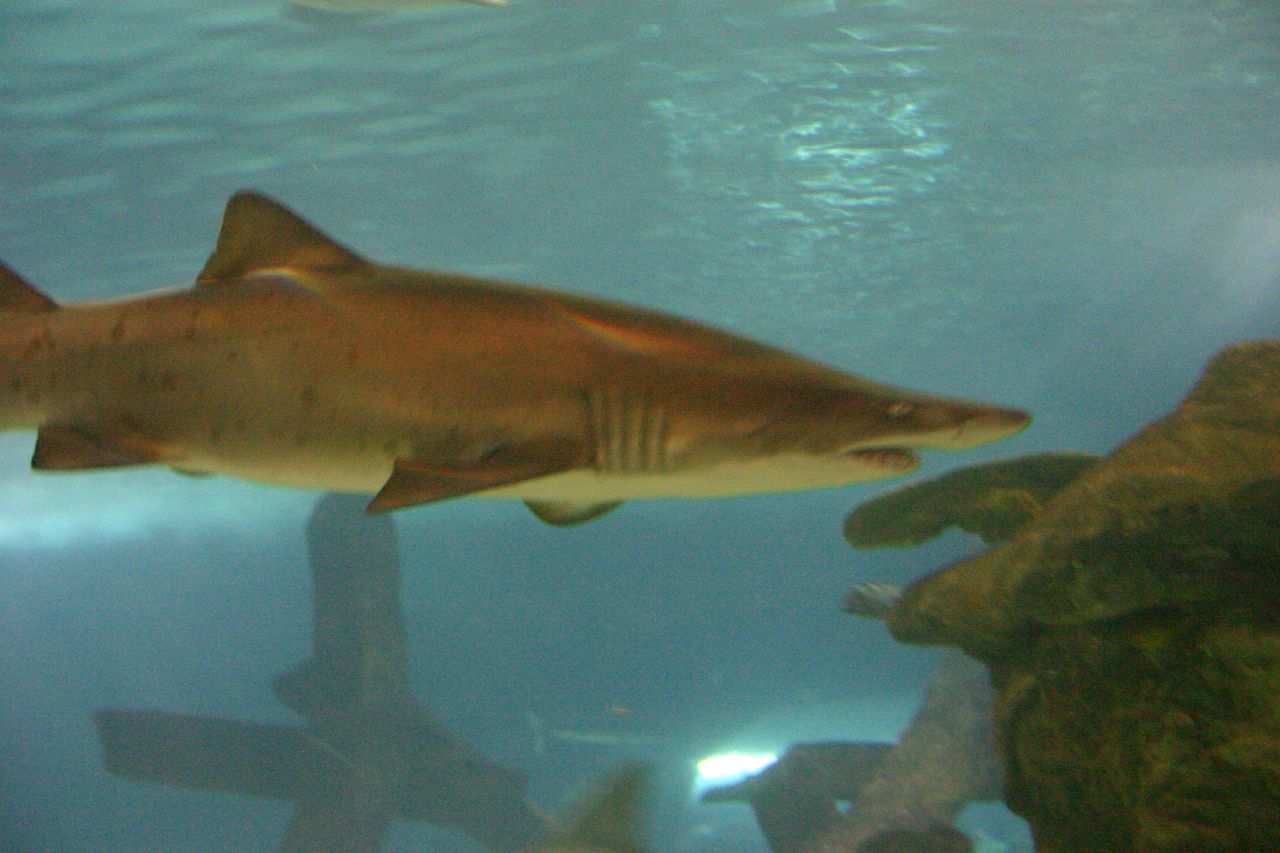
A shark on exhibit

Brave the Rainforest features multiple pop up tanks to allow visitors to get closer to the creatures and a Ranger Stage with extra facts and animals. The rainforest features spectacled caiman, poison dart frogs, piranhas, freshwater angelfish and other exotic species.

The Tunnel, a 300-foot (91 m) 360° acrylic tunnel that goes through four exhibits: Sturgeon Lake, Wild Amazon, Shark Cove and Rainbow Reef.

- Sturgeon Lake is a fresh water exhibit designed to simulate a Minnesotan body of water, and features turtles, gar, bass, lake and shovelnose sturgeon, common carp, smallmouth buffalo, tiger muskie, channel catfish, and paddlefish, among others. The exhibit also features alligator gars, which are not found naturally in Minnesota.
- Wild Amazon consists of arapaima, arowanas, black pacu, midas cichlids, fossil catfish, pictus catfish, leopard catfish, tiger shovelnose catfish, plecos, flagtails, silver dollars, and freshwater stingrays.
- Shark Cove is themed to look like a shipwreck, and with a volume of 500,000 US gallons (1,900,000 L) it is the largest exhibit in the aquarium. Shark Cove holds multiple shark species including: Sand tiger sharks, Nurse sharks, Brown shark, and Whitetip reef sharks. It also contains southern stingrays, giant shovel-nosed guitarfish, and green sawfish and two Loggerhead sea turtles. In addition, it has a red snapper, jacks, and other species.
- Rainbow Reef which resembles coral reefs, has stingrays, puffer fish, assorted tangs, bamboo sharks and others.

The Coral Caves hold live coral and fish such as clownfish and regal blue tang.

Seahorse Kingdom features seahorses.

Jellyfish Discovery features moon jellyfish.

Ray Lagoon features a ray pool full of cownose stingray, Atlantic stingray, southern stingray, shovelnose guitarfish and other rays.

Pacific Northwest Rockpool features a touch pool full of assorted anemone, sea stars, sea urchins, and prawns.
