= Mall of America =

Megamall with attractions in Hennepin County, Minnesota, U.S.

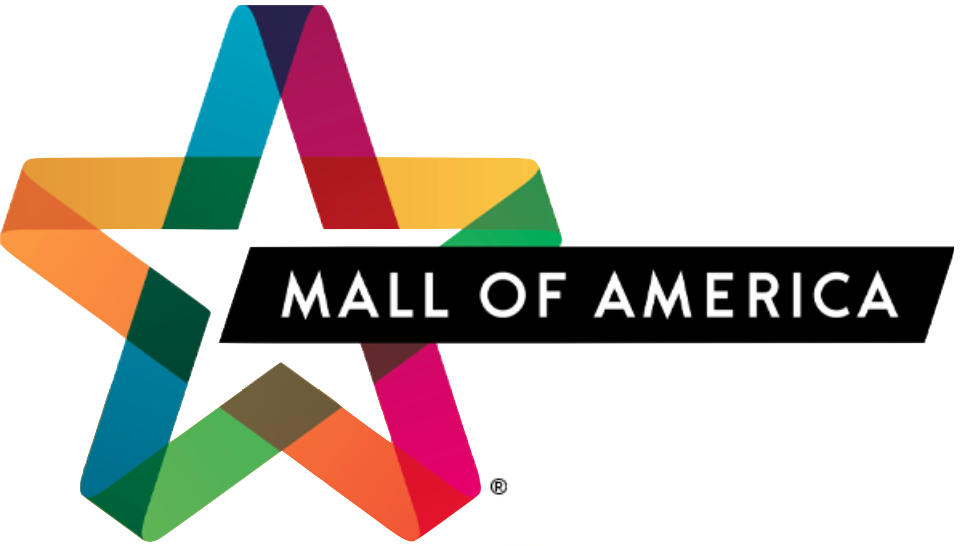

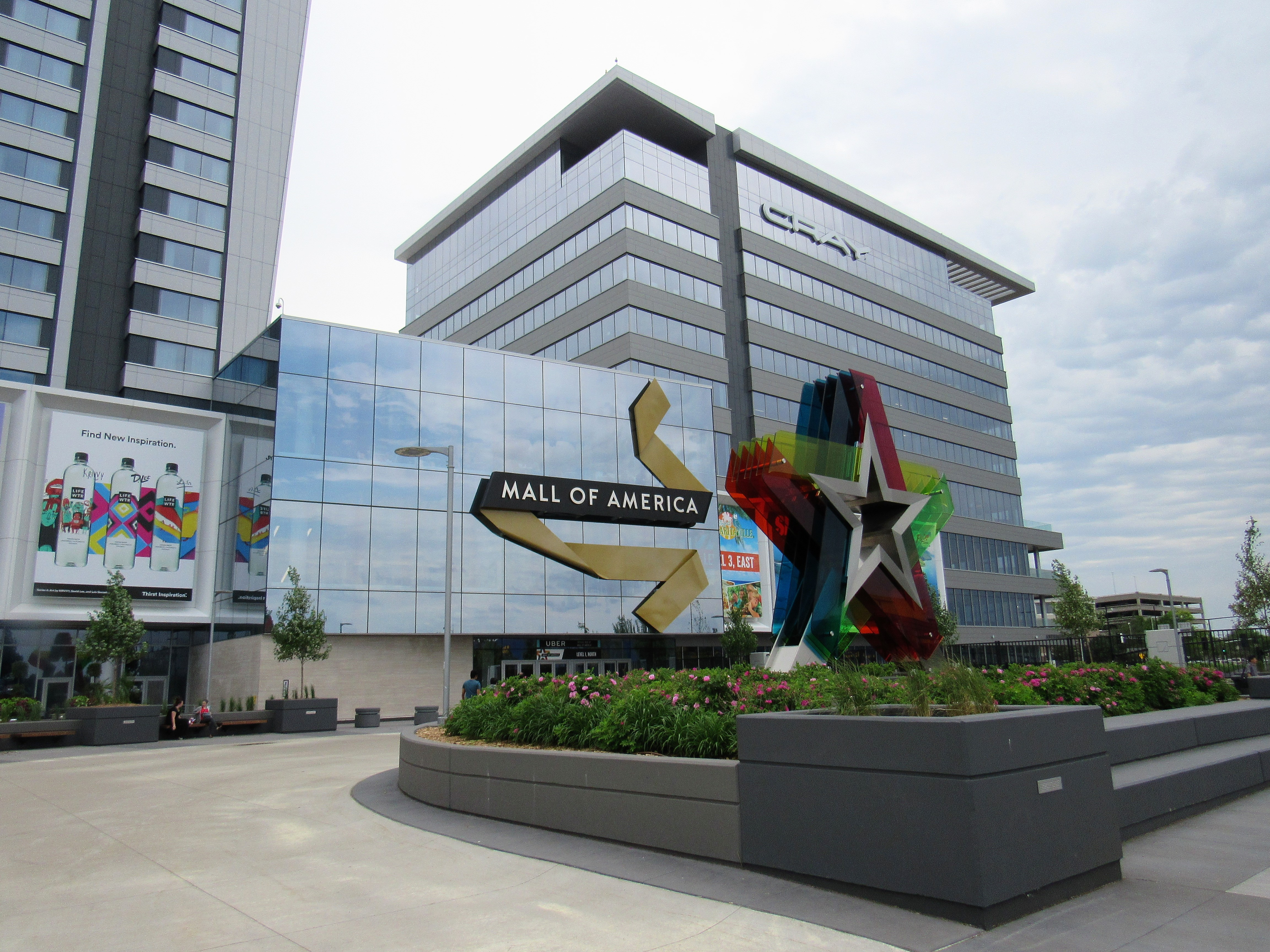
- Main entrance (June 2018)
- Location: Bloomington, Minnesota, U.S.
- Coordinates: 44°51′15″N 93°14′32″W
- Address: 60 E Broadway, 55425 (Mall of America); 2131 Lindau Lane, 55425 (The Offices @ MOA, the complex's management office)
- Opened: August 11, 1992; 34 years ago
- Renovated: Fall 2013 – Summer 2015 (Phase I); March 2022 (Phase II)
- Previous names: Minnesota International Center (planning)
- Developer: Triple Five Group (Ghermezian family) (22.5%); Melvin Simon & Associates (22.5%); Teachers Insurance and Annuity Association (TIAA-CREF) (55%)
- Manager: MOAC Mall Holdings, LLC (subsidiary of Triple Five Group)
- Owner: Triple Five Group
- Architect: Jerde Partnership (led by Jon Jerde); KKE Architects, Inc. (now DLR Group); HGA (Hammel, Green and Abrahamson)
- Num. of stores: 520+ (at peak)
- Num. of anchor tenants: 6 (5 open, 1 vacant)
- Floor area: 5,689,000 square feet (528,500 m^{2}) ranked 1st
- Floors: 4 on East and South Wings; 3 on North and West Wings
- Parking: 12,300 free and paid spaces (Two 7-story parking garages and two overflow parking lots)
- Public transit: Blue Line; Red Line; D Line
- Website: Official website
- Building details
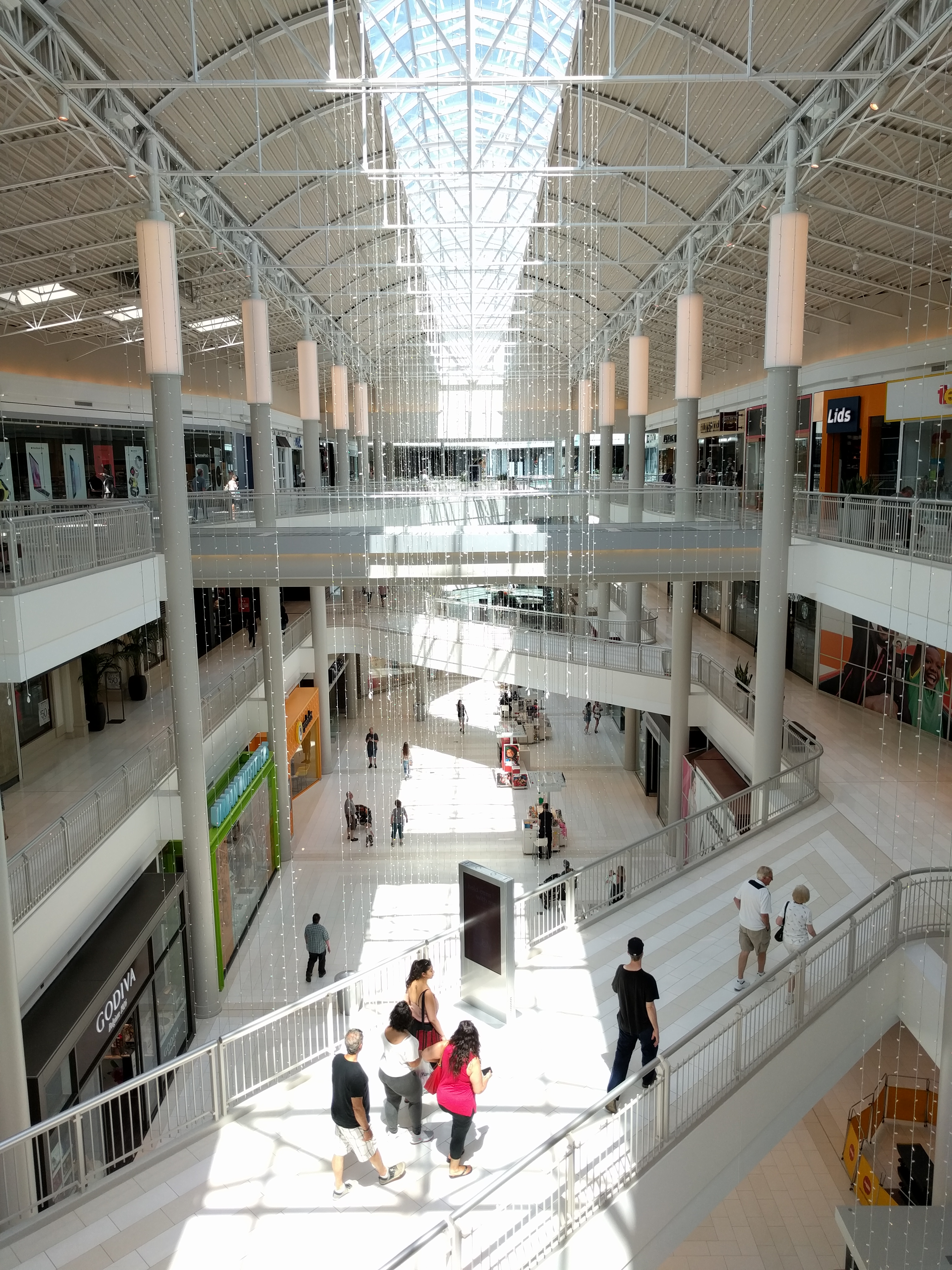
- Interior view after renovations (March 2018)

General information
- Status: Operational
- Construction started: June 14, 1989; 37 years ago
- Completed: 1992

Design and construction
- Main contractor: PCL Construction

Mall of America (MOA) is a super-regional shopping mall and entertainment complex in Bloomington, Minnesota. Located within the Minneapolis–Saint Paul metropolitan area, the mall lies southeast of the junction of Interstate 494 and Minnesota State Highway 77, north of the Minnesota River, and across the Interstate from the Minneapolis–Saint Paul International Airport. It opened in August 1992 on the former site of Metropolitan Stadium, and is the largest mall in the United States, the largest in the Western Hemisphere, and the 13th largest shopping mall in the world.

The mall was developed by the Canadian real estate firm Triple Five Group, led by the Ghermezian family, in a joint venture with Melvin Simon & Associates (later Simon DeBartolo Group, now Simon Property Group) and Teachers Insurance and Annuity Association (TIAA-CREF, now simply TIAA). Simon Property Group acquired TIAA's shares in the property in January 1999, leading to the Ghermezian family to sue them. Then, in September 2003, Simon was forced to sell its disputed stake and management role to Triple Five Group, which eventually gained full control of Mall of America in November 2006. As of September 2025, approximately 32 million people visit the mall annually, 80% of whom are from Minnesota, Wisconsin, Iowa, Nebraska, the Dakotas, Illinois and Ohio, making the mall effectively attract more tourists than Walt Disney World and Disneyland Resort combined. (Note: Claim may vary by source.) Triple Five Group also owns the second largest mall in the United States, American Dream in Bergen County, New Jersey, and the largest mall in Canada, being West Edmonton Mall in Alberta.

== Overview ==
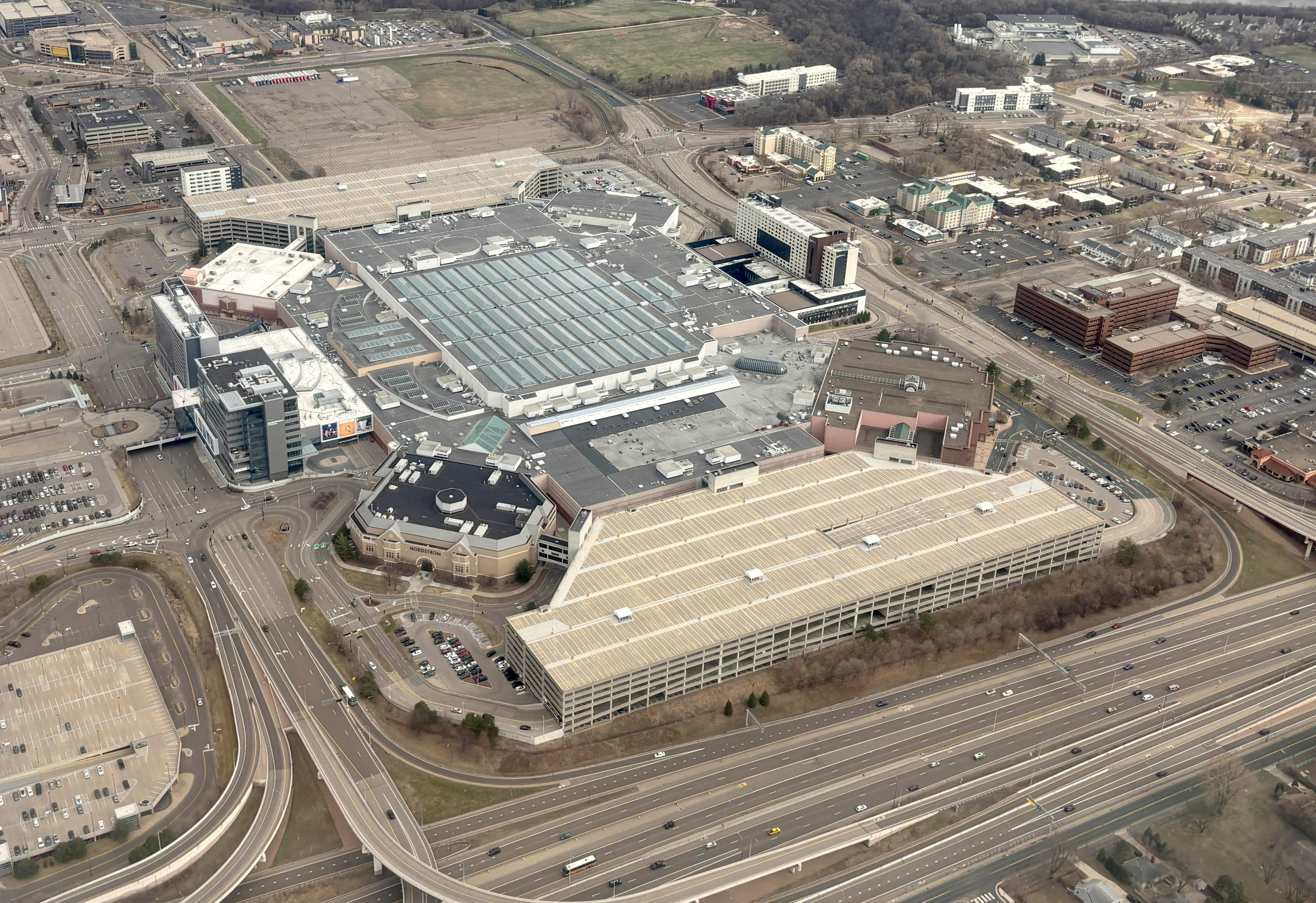
Aerial photograph of the entire complex (May 2025)

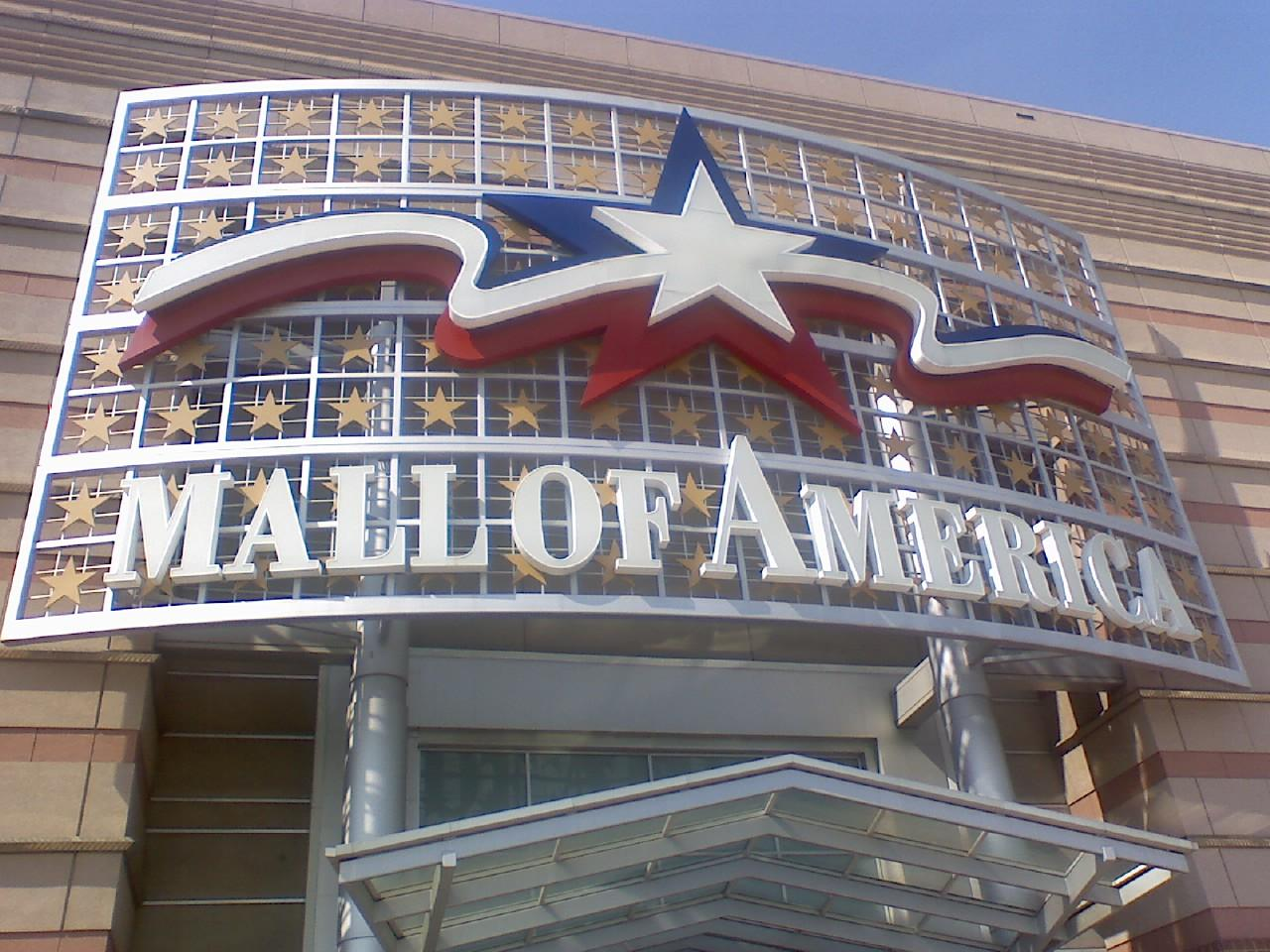
Original logo (1992–2015)

Mall of America has a gross floor area (GFA) of 5,689,000 square feet (528,500 m^{2}) or 129 acres (52 ha), and a gross leasable area (GLA) of 2,869,000 square feet (266,500 m^{2}). The mall is nearly symmetric, with a roughly rectangular floor plan. More than 520 stores are arranged along three levels of pedestrian walkways on the sides of the rectangle, with a fourth level on the south and east sides. Four anchor department stores are located at the corners. The mall is organized into four different zones. Each of those zones had its own decorative style until a series of renovations from 2010 to 2015 led to a unified and more luxurious style, as well as to coincide with the mall's first major expansion. The mall's food court is on the third floor.

Many have described Mall of America as a "city within a city". Despite Minnesota's cold winters, only the mall's entrances and some below ground areas are heated. Heat is allowed in through skylights above the central amusement park area. The majority of the heat is produced by lighting fixtures, other electric devices and people in the mall. Even during the winter, HVAC systems may still be in use during peak hours to ensure a comfortable shopping environment. Although the common areas are unheated, the individual stores do have heating systems.

== History ==
=== 1982–1992: Planning and construction ===
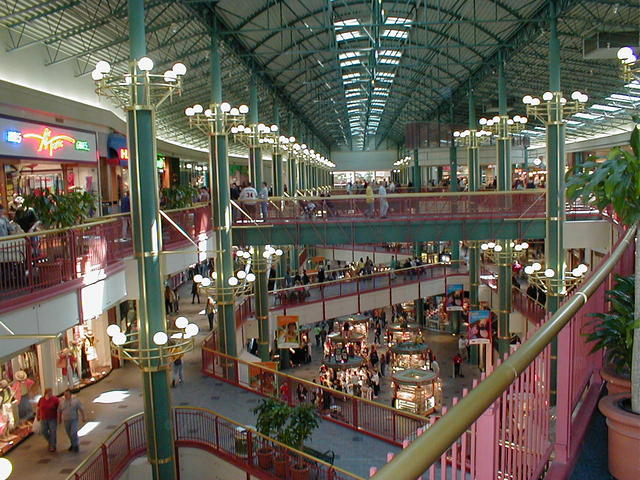
Interior view prior to renovations (November 1999)

The Mall of America is located on the former site of the Metropolitan Stadium, where the Minnesota Vikings and Minnesota Twins played until the Hubert H. Humphrey Metrodome opened in April 1982. As a result, Metropolitan Stadium was demolished in January 1985, leaving 78 acres (32 ha) of empty land perfectly situated just 1.5 miles from the Minneapolis–Saint Paul International Airport and directly off Interstate 494. The Bloomington Port Authority acquired the property from the Minnesota Sports Facilities Authority and issued a worldwide Request for Proposals (RFP) to redevelop the land into a major commercial project that same year. A retail and entertainment complex, a convention center, office buildings, or residential housing were the choices given for what would be built on the site. Later that year, the Canadian-based Triple Five Group, led by the Ghermezian brothers, which had recently completed West Edmonton Mall in Alberta, proposed the Minnesota International Center, with an initial concept featuring a massive man-made lake with 6-foot waves for indoor surfing and water skiing. Submarines would also be included to allow visitors to view exotic sea life from underwater vessels. A 12-story rollercoaster, a 1-million-square-foot (93,000 m^{2}) convention center, two office towers, an 18-story hotel, and an 18-hole golf course were also planned, but the entire proposal was eventually scrapped.

In 1986, Triple Five was officially selected as the developer for the project following their proposal. However, they had revised and submitted plans for a massive enclosed retail and entertainment complex that would feature over 400 stores, restaurants, and an indoor theme park that would formerly be known as Fantasyworld (later rebranded as Knott's Camp Snoopy). The Bloomington City Council approved their updated proposal in 1987, and later that year, Triple Five partnered with the Indianapolis, Indiana-based Melvin Simon & Associates and Teachers Insurance and Annuity Association (TIAA) to help develop the project. Three architectural firms—the Los Angeles, California-based Jerde Partnership, led by Jon Jerde, KKE Architects, Inc. of Minneapolis (formerly Korsunsky Krank Erickson), and Hammel, Green and Abrahamson (HGA)—were hired to design the complex. The new project would be called "Mall of America".

Groundbreaking for the mall took place on June 14, 1989, costing approximately $650 million to build. To support the massive structure, the City of Bloomington invested over $100 million in infrastructure improvements. Jon Jerde designed the mall to feel like a series of distinct neighborhoods rather than one long corridor. The four main zones (East Broadway, West Market, North Garden, South Avenue) were given unique architectural themes to aid navigation and create variety. The building was also designed without a central air conditioning system for the retail areas. Instead, it would rely on the "flywheel effect"—heat generated by skylights, lighting fixtures, and body heat from massive crowds, keeping the interior at nearly 70°F year-round.

=== 1992–2006: Grand opening and early years ===
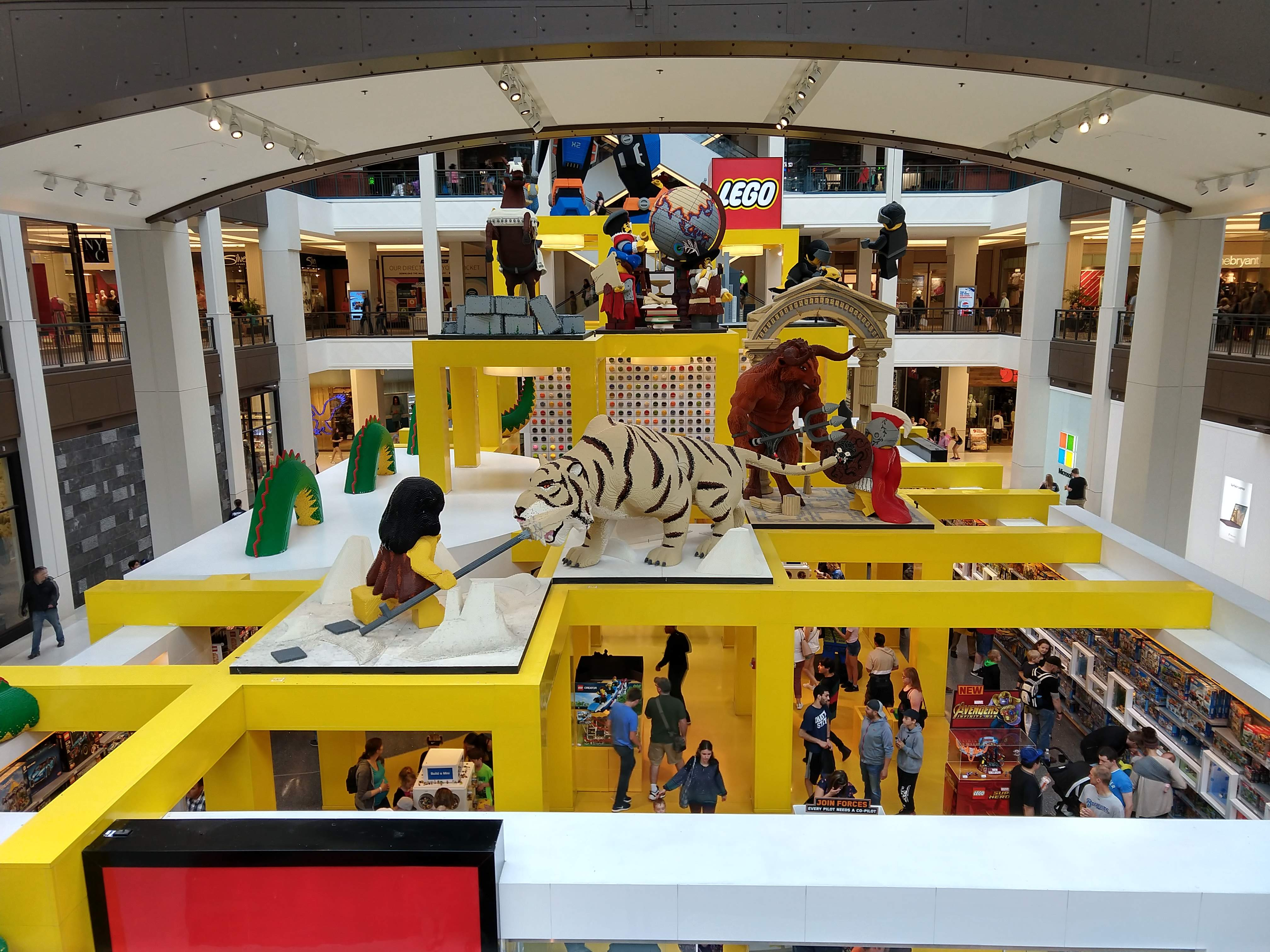
Lego Store (June 2018)

The Mall of America had its grand opening celebration on August 11, 1992, with 330 stores and 10,000 employees. Its anchor tenants were originally Nordstrom, Macy's, Bloomingdale's (their 15th location nationwide and their first location in Minnesota) and Sears. Many companies opened flagship locations at the mall, including the Disney Store, the Warner Bros. Studio Store, the Xscape Entertainment Center, and the first Lego Store (also referred to as the Lego Imagination Center) location ever. The opening attracted at least 150,000 visitors, silencing many critics with skepticism; they initially argued that a massive indoor park and retail center would fail in Minnesota. A commemorative plaque in the mall's amusement park, renamed simply as Camp Snoopy, commemorates the former location of home plate and one seat from Metropolitan Stadium was placed in Mall of America at the exact location it occupied in the stadium, commemorating a 520-foot (160 m) home run hit by hall-of-famer Harmon Killebrew on June 3, 1967. Melvin Simon & Associates became the managing general partner of the property, alongside TIAA.

The Theatres at Mall of America opened on August 14, 1992, three days after the grand opening of the mall, initially operated by the General Cinema Corporation. It originally featured 14 traditional screens with a massive combined seating capacity of 3,776. The movie theater occupied the south side of the fourth floor. Planet Hollywood had its grand opening in December 1993, attracting an estimated 35,000 people who crowded the mall's floors and amusement park rides to see celebrity investors. This included Arnold Schwarzenegger, Sylvester Stallone, and Bruce Willis. Steven Schussler opened his first Rainforest Cafe location in history on the mall's first floor in October 1994. By 1997, Mall of America became the largest shopping mall in total area and largest in total store vendors in the United States when it opened, with 92% occupancy. The Mall of America's 42 million annual visitors equal roughly eight times the population of the state of Minnesota.

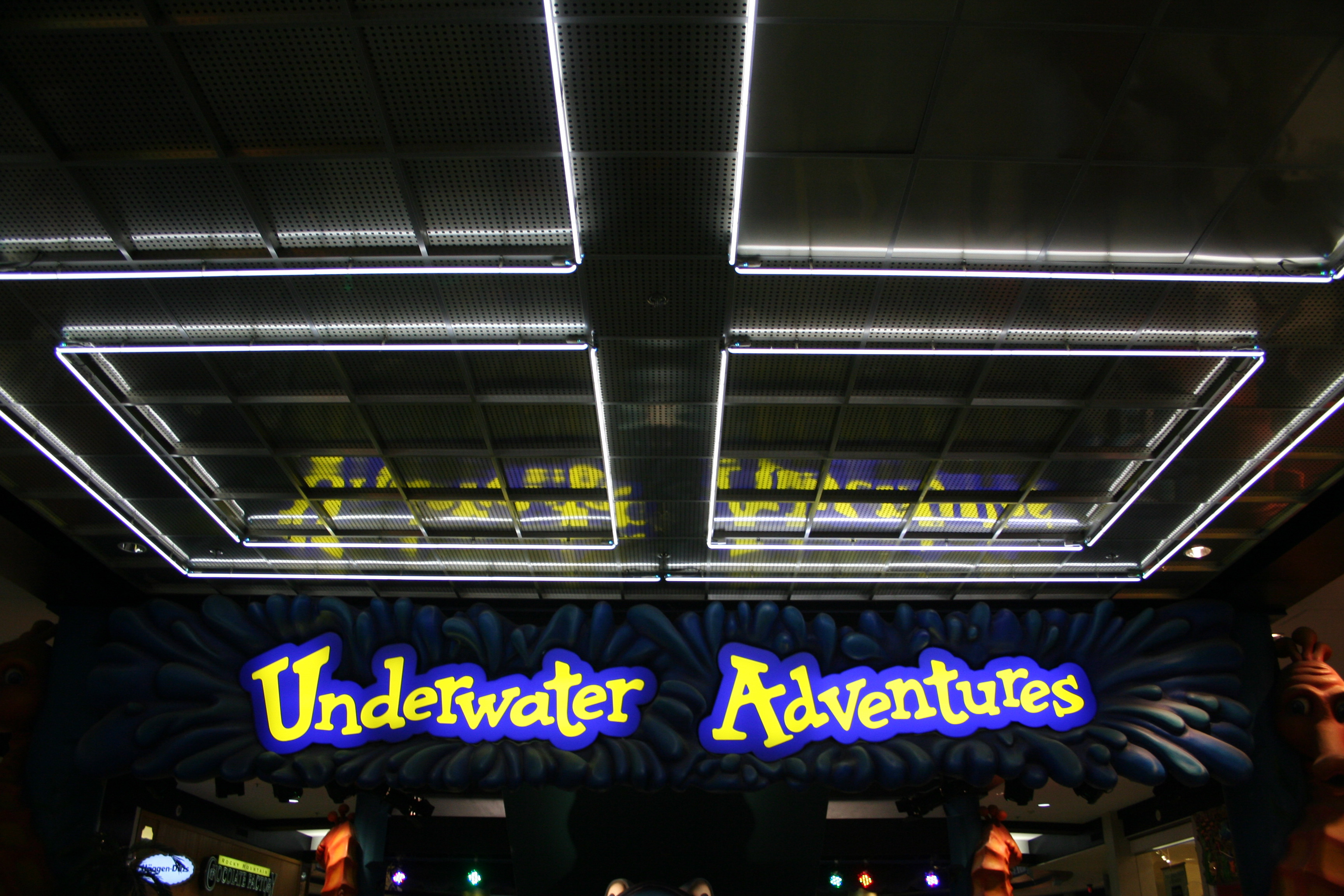
Underwater Adventures at Mall of America (March 2007)

Underwater World, an aquarium, opened at the mall in 1996, though it struggled financially and filed for bankruptcy in 1998. It was rebranded as Underwater Adventures Aquarium in 2000 after being acquired by the Minnesota Aquarium LLC, a group of investors led by local native Todd Peterson. In June 2001, General Cinema was acquired and rebranded by AMC Theatres, leading to the Theatres at Mall of America to be rebranded and operated as AMC Mall of America 14. In 1999, Jillian's Hi-Life Lanes moved into a massive 50,000 sq ft (4,600 m^{2}) space on the fourth floor that had previously been occupied by America Live! (a multi-venue nightclub complex) and the Gatlin Brothers Music City theater. At the time of its opening, the Mall of America location was the largest in the Jillian's chain.

==== Triple Five Group v. Simon Property Group ====
In March 1998, TIAA requested Simon DeBartolo Group and Triple Five Group to purchase half of their 55% stake in the property. Herbert Simon, Chairman of Simon Property Group, responded with a letter made by Triple Five, ensuring that any deal would be fair to them rather than just a private deal for the Simon family's benefit. Despite this, Randolph Foxworthy, principal of Si-Minn, Inc. (Mall of America Company) secretly sent emails to Simon, explaining how they could acquire TIAA's shares. During a partnership meeting in December of that year, TIAA asked again for Triple Five and Simon to acquire their shares in MOA. Even though the request specifically asked the purchase to be a joint effort, Simon acquired TIAA's 27.5% equity stake in the property in January 1999, giving them majority ownership without notifying the Ghermezian brothers about the deal or the negotiations. As a result, Triple Five Group sued Simon Property Group on October 29, 1999, citing fiduciary duty violation. In September 2003, after a protracted six-year legal battle between Simon and Triple Five Group over majority ownership of the site, U.S. District Judge Paul A. Magnuson ruled in favor of the Ghermezians, famously noting that evidence from the trial—including secretly recorded phone conversations—contained behavior that could best be characterized as "boorish" and something "one might expect to see on a playground" rather than in high-level business. He labeled Simon's actions as the "worst kind of self-dealing and subterfuge".

Simon contended that Triple Five simply lacked the money required for the acquisition at the time of the 1999 deal, and also claimed that TIAA specifically did not want to deal with the Ghermezians, making Simon the only viable buyer. They also argued that by stepping in to buy the stake themselves, they actually protected Triple Five by preventing TIAA from selling to an outside party, which could have resulted in the loss of management fees for the partnership. Despite this, the judge rejected these claims, ruling that Triple Five actually did have enough cash in 1999 to cover the purchase. The court found that Simon had intentionally concealed the negotiations to usurp the business opportunity for themselves. As a punishment, he forced Simon to sell its disputed stake directly to Triple Five Group at a fixed price of $81.4 million, and they were fired as the manager. On November 3, 2006, the Ghermezians gained full control of Mall of America by spending $1 billion to acquire Simon Property Group's remaining shares.

=== 2000–2018: 10th anniversary, fourth floor revitalization, and Phase I renovations ===
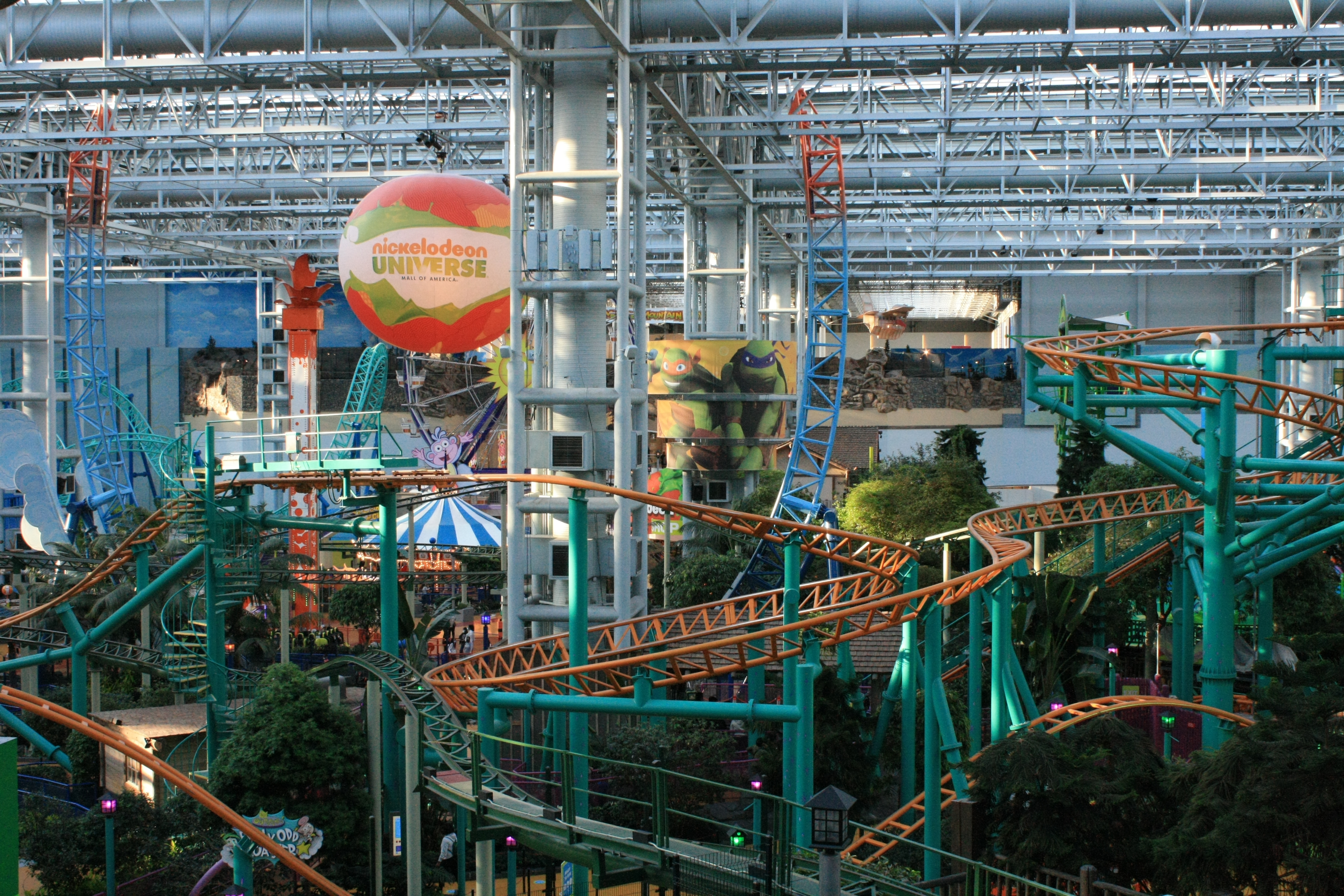
Nickelodeon Universe Mall of America (April 2021)

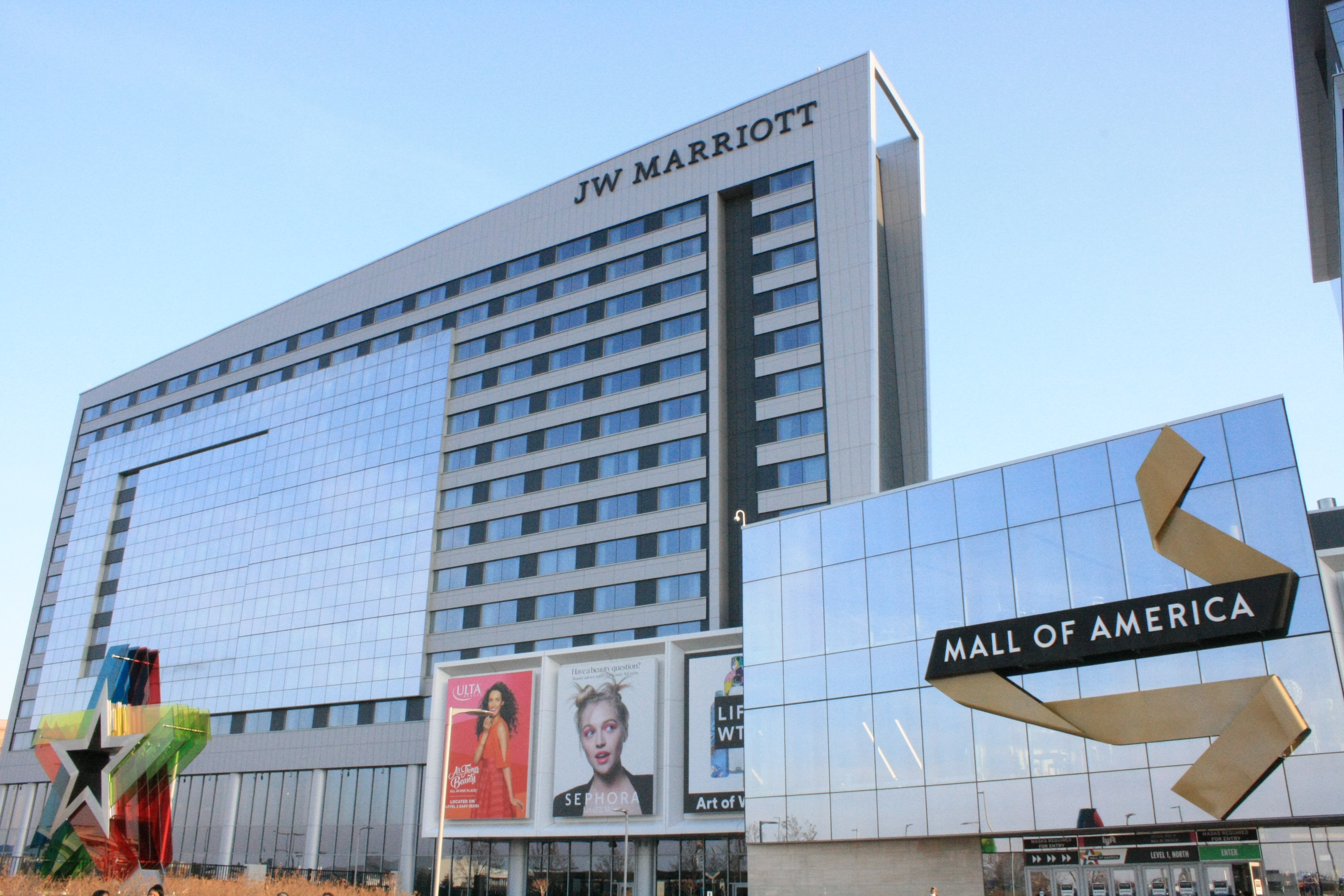
JW Marriott Minneapolis Mall of America (April 2021)

The Warner Bros. Studio Store closed permanently in December 2001 as a result of the AOL-Time Warner merger. Mall of America celebrated its 10th anniversary in August 2002, marking a decade since it opened its doors to the public. By that year, the mall was attracting roughly 40 million visitors annually. The mall was also not only operational but "booming", having generated over $800 million in tax revenue since its opening. To honor the victims of the September 11 attacks, including Minnesota native Thomas Burnett Jr., a memorial in the Nordstrom Court was established during the mall's 10th birthday. According to the Los Angeles Times, the mall was so large that "seven Yankee Stadiums could fit inside" the structure as of mid-September of that year.

By early September 2005, Mall of America featured IKEA across the property (opened August 2004), but its fourth floor was largely vacant. The only tenants remaining there were Hooters and the movie theater. The former tenants included:

- Fat Tuesday, which closed permanently in early 2000. During a Mardi Gras celebration in the spring of 2000, the bar became the site of what police and city officials described as "rowdy and illegal activity". The event drew intense scrutiny for widespread reports of indecent exposure (specifically toplessness and flashing for beads) and other alcohol-related offenses. The sheer volume of people and the chaotic nature of the party raised immediate red flags for mall security and the Bloomington Police Department, who felt the venue was no longer a safe fit for the mall environment. Its liquor license was effectively revoked, triggering the permanent closure.
- Gators Bar and Grill also closed its doors in ≈2002 following the Mardi Gras party. In the summer of that year, three patrons were hospitalized after voluntarily consuming gamma-hydroxybutyrate (GHB) while they were at the club. The incident drew intense negative media attention and raised serious concerns about the safety and oversight of the venue. Not only that, the company was involved in a high-profile legal battle (Johns v. Harborage I) after a server and hostess were sexually harassed by a co-worker. While the victims were awarded compensatory damages, the original ownership entity was deemed "judgment proof", leading to years of litigation over which successor entity was responsible for the payment. Mall of America management also began moving away from "party-heavy" nightclubs following the Mardi Gras celebration, shifting to family-friendly entertainment centers. This ultimately led to the complete ban of smoking in 2004.
- Planet Hollywood left in September 2003 as part of a strategic plan to shut down underperforming restaurants. This was followed by Jillian's, which closed permanently in August 2005 after filing for Chapter 11 bankruptcy. While Dave & Buster's purchased nine of the chain's locations, the Mall of America site was ultimately abandoned after lease negotiations with Triple Five Group failed. America's Original Sports Bar & Player's Bar, Lt'l Ditty's & Flashbaxx were also owned by Jillian's Entertainment, and therefore closed simultaneously.

On January 9, 2006, Triple Five Group announced that talks between MOA and Cedar Fair (which owns the national rights to amusement-park branding of the Peanuts license) had broken down, primarily over the mall's rights to effectively market its park within and outside the United States, and effective January 19, the park's Peanuts branding would end, with Camp Snoopy being temporarily renamed "The Park at MOA" while new branding was being applied. All traces of the Peanuts branding was removed, some very sloppily, although the gift shops were allowed to continue selling Peanuts merchandise without the Camp Snoopy label. The inflatable Snoopy character was removed and it took several months before it was finally replaced by a generic tree house inflatable. The Funtastic World of Hanna-Barbera was the final film played in the Mystery Mine Ride, with the Mystery Mine Ride closing permanently in 2007. Many other landmarks in the park were either replaced by generic landmarks or not replaced at all.

On November 8, 2005, Viacom International filed a trademark for the name Nickelodeon Universe. The park's new licensing deal and name was announced on July 25, 2007. Construction began on August 27, 2007, work was completed in sections so 80 to 90% of the park remained accessible at all times. Nickelodeon Universe was completed and reopened on March 15, 2008. On May 18, 2008, the Mall of America received a tax break for a proposed $2 billion expansion and renovation project. The bill gave the City of Bloomington the ability to increase taxes on sales, lodging, food, and beverages to finance a parking ramp at the mall. AMC's lease ended in September 2008, and mall management rebranded it back to Theatres at Mall of America. American Girl had its grand opening on November 15, 2008.

To revitalize the largely vacant fourth floor, Sky Deck Sports Grille & Lanes officially announced in October 2009 that it would open there in May 2010, adjacent to the movie theater. Merlin Entertainments acquired Underwater Adventures Aquarium in December 2008 and announced that it would be rebranded once more as Sea Life at Mall of America in January 2011. On March 24, 2012, Triple Five Group partnered with the Omaha, Nebraska-based architectural engineering firm DLR Group (which acquired the mall's original architects, KKE, in July 2010), announced the start of a $200 million expansion that would build into the north parking lot of the mall. The plans called for an additional hotel and an additional 200,000 square feet (19,000 m^{2}) of retail space. In 2010, the mall began its first major interior renovation, which cost more than $50 million, which included revamps to the mall's wings, a redesigned east retunda, an atrium in the former Bloomingdale's space and a 450-foot (140 m) skylight in the west wing.

On January 3, 2012, Macy's, Inc. announced it would close its Bloomingdale's location at the Mall of America after nearly two decades, with Macy's remaining operational. Radisson Blu Mall of America opened on March 15, 2013, as the company's second hotel in the U.S., following their first property in Chicago, Illinois which opened in 2011. The 13-story, 500-room hotel is connected to the south side of the mall via a second-level skybridge, allowing shoppers to transition between the venues without stepping outside. The opening introduced the mall to the FireLake Grill House & Cocktail Bar, a farm-to-table concept heavily centered on local Minnesota heartland flavors. The project cost approximately $137.5 million to construct. The renovation and expansion project began construction in the fall of 2013 and began opening in stages in the summer of 2015. In March 2014, ground was broken on the mall's north side for the $104 million, 14-story JW Marriott Minneapolis Mall of America, owned and financed by the Shakopee Mdewakanton Sioux Community. As part of the $30 million to $50 million multi-level renovation, the former Bloomingdale's space was broken up to house junior anchors: Forever 21, L.L.Bean, and Crayola Experience.

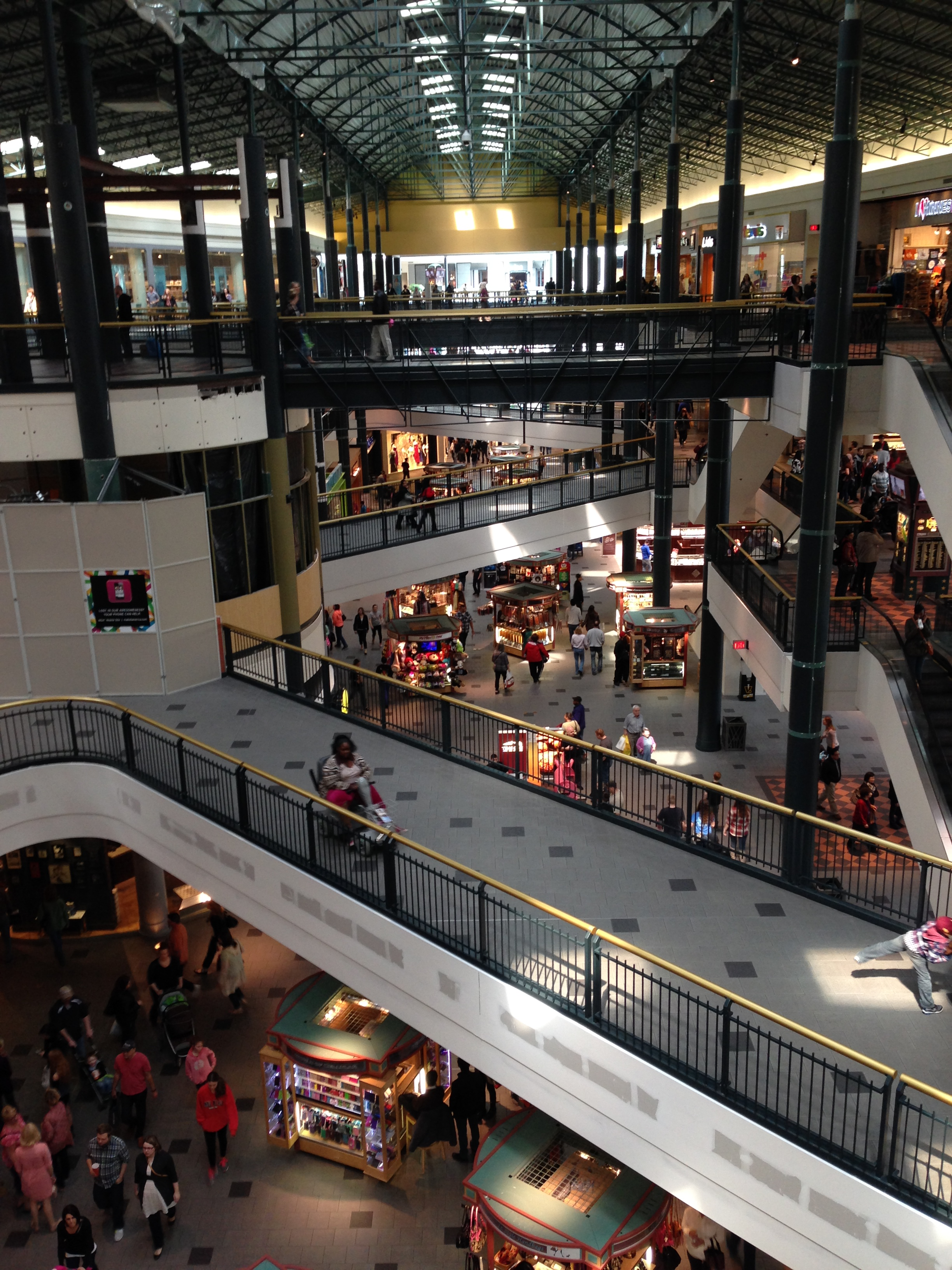
Three-level corridor in April 2014 as renovations were underway

On August 28, 2014, Hard Rock Cafe had its grand opening at Mall of America and had its first concert on September 18 of that year with Nico & Vinz. The restaurant had its formal grand opening to the public on October 22, 2014, featuring a ceremonial smashing of 15 guitars and an 80-minute live performance by the iconic Minnesota band Morris Day & The Time. Spanning 15,000 sq ft (1,400 m^{2}), the multi-level restaurant sat about 400 guests and featured a large live music stage, a retail rock shop, and local memorabilia on the walls including pieces from Prince and Bob Dylan. As of 2015, the mall employed over 11,000 workers year-round and 13,000 during peak seasons. This was the chain's new restaurant in Minnesota following the permanent closure of its former location at Block E (now called Mayo Clinic Square) in September 2011. Shake Shack opened a 2,800 sq ft (260 m^{2}) restaurant at Mall of America on June 9, 2016, attracting over 80 people who were already waiting by 11 a.m. CDT. As part of the renovations, Rainforest Cafe announced on January 6, 2015, that it would relocate from its lower-level space to the third floor of the mall. Parent company Landry's, Inc. moved the cafe to the third floor to sit alongside its "corporate cousins", Bubba Gump Shrimp Co. and Margaritaville, creating a concentrated zone for themed dining. The relocated Rainforest Cafe had its "grand reopening" on January 21, 2016. On December 22, 2016, it was announced that Theatres at Mall of America would permanently close its doors the following week. Mall officials explained that closing the theater was a strategic move to make way for a "new, first-to-market entertainment venue". Rather than sticking with the traditional, self-operated theater model that had been in place since 2008, the mall wanted to bring in a fresh concept. This eventually paved the way for the luxury cinema chain CMX Cinemas, a subsidiary of Cinemex, which gutted and completely remodeled the outdated space, reopening the movie theater as CMX Mall of America 14 in January 2017.

Sky Deck was rebranded as GameWorks on July 10, 2017, featuring more modern arcade game attractions, expanded esports facilities, and updated menu options, while retaining the signature bowling lanes. In March 2018, it was announced that MoA had proposed to build an indoor water park, with a cost between $150 and $200 million for the project.

=== 2018–present: Mall of America vs. Sears and Hard Rock Cafe, and Phase II renovations ===
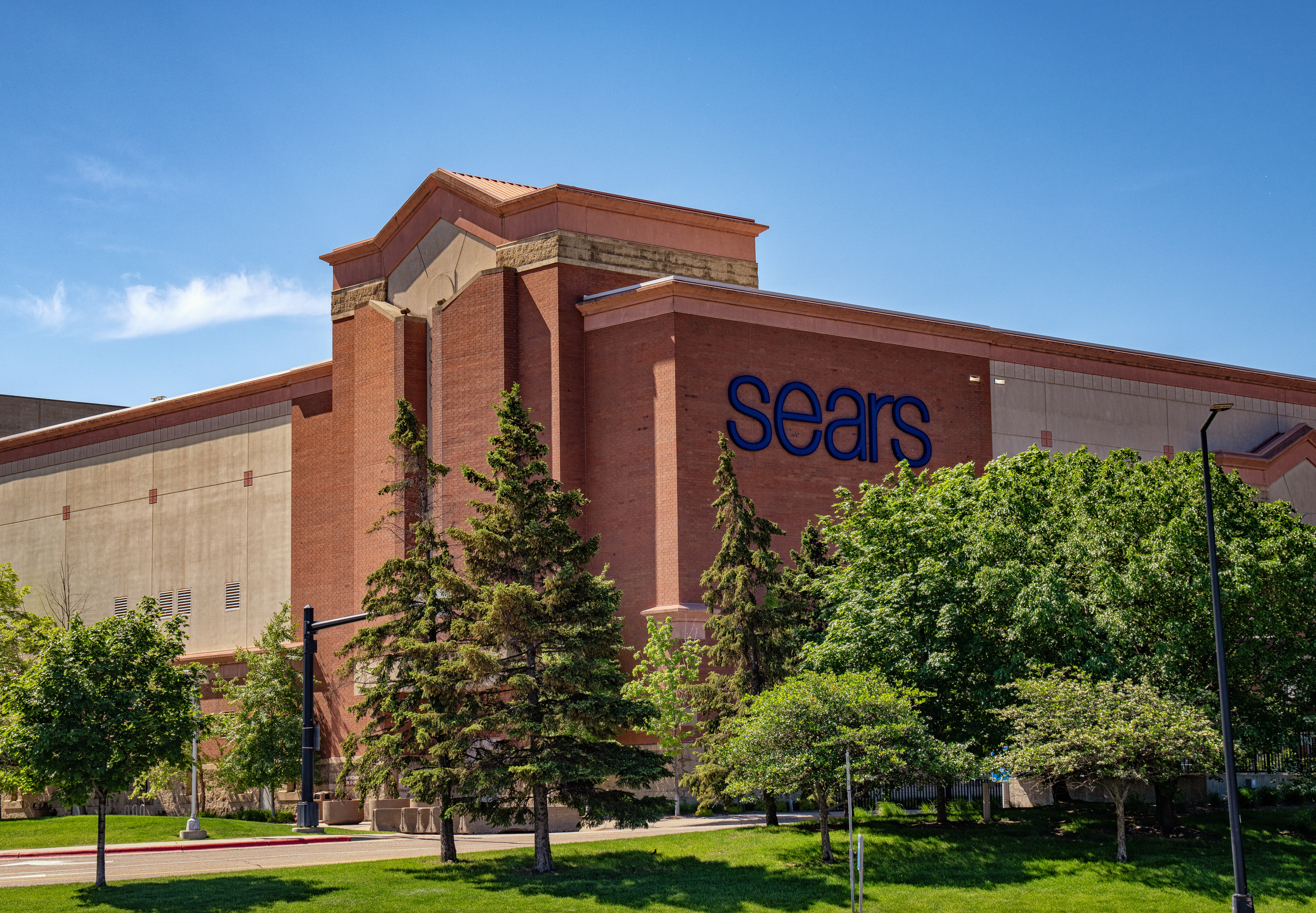
Former Sears building in May 2024

J.Crew announced that it would be closing as part of a strategic decision to shut down 39 stores nationwide. On December 28, 2018, it was announced that Sears would also be closing as part of a plan to close 80 stores nationwide after filing for Chapter 11 bankruptcy. As of June 2025, it has remained vacant because Triple Five Group and Transform Holdco (the property company that acquired Sears' assets in February 2019) have taken their battle all the way to the U.S. Supreme Court twice. This is because Transformco retained its $10-a-year lease, effectively acting like a "second landlord" at MoA. Tensions reached a boiling point when Transformco began trying to recruit its own tenants to fill the vacant Sears space. Triple Five vehemently opposed this, and the legal finger-pointing continued as prospective tenants walked away from the space due to the endless litigation.

American Girl announced on February 1, 2019 that it would close permanently on March 20 due to the expiration of its lease and a strategic shift by its parent company, Mattel. On March 17, 2020, Mall of America closed for a period of twelve weeks in response to the COVID-19 pandemic, and reopening on June 10 with only 150 tenants open for business. The mall was originally scheduled to reopen on June 1, but civil unrest in the Twin Cities around this time caused the mall to postpone the reopening. After the mall reopened from the pandemic, Hard Rock International (the parent company of Hard Rock Cafe) made the decision to not reopen its restaurant at the mall, despite Minnesota easing restrictions in June 2020 to allow restaurants to operate at 50% capacity. As a result, Mall of America sued Hard Rock Cafe for approximately $550,000 in unpaid rent and fees in October 2020. The mall's monthly rent for the 10-year lease was roughly $70,500.

Hard Rock Cafe was ultimately forced to close permanently on January 15 of that same year following an eviction notice received by Triple Five Group, with a short window of time to retrieve its famous memorabilia and place them in other locations while keeping fixtures like tables and chairs. The restaurant was also completely locked out from the mall itself. Later, in March 2021, Hard Rock International argued in court that it was discharged from lease obligations because pandemic-related government orders prohibited them from operating as intended. However, Triple Five Group countered that other restaurants had reopened and that Hard Rock Cafe simply chose not to. The legal battle was later resolved when the mall and Hard Rock International settled for undisclosed terms in April of that same year. The restaurant ultimately never reopened.

What was also announced later that month was the opening of Warby Parker and the permanent closure of the Disney Store, with The Walt Disney Company citing a move to its shopDisney e-commerce platform following the pandemic. Triple Five Group has faced significant financial pressure due to American Dream in Bergen County, New Jersey, leading them to use 49% of the Mall of America and the West Edmonton Mall as collateral for loans in late March 2021. The former American Girl was replaced with a 24,000 sq ft (2,200 m^{2}) M&M's World flagship (operating as M&M's Mall of America), which would open to the public on May 1, 2021. Due to Cinemex's Chapter 11 bankruptcy proceedings, caused by the pandemic, CMX Mall of America 14 closed permanently and was replaced with B&B Theatres in May 2021, operating as B&B Theatres Bloomington 13 @ Mall of America, introducing ScreenX technology and luxury amenities to the cinema. In mid-October 2021, Mall of America partnered with Wisdom Gaming Studios to open a 18,000 sq ft (1,700 m^{2}) esports arena and broadcast studio. GameWorks closed its doors on December 24, 2021, as the entire chain underwent liquidation, citing the pandemic as the reason for its struggles. In March 2022, the water park plan was approved by the Bloomington City Council. Tentatively named Mystery Cove, it is slated to open on the north side of the mall within the next few years, and expected to cost between $150 and $250 million. It will span 350,000 sq ft (33,000 m^{2}), and its concept is designed by DLR Group.

Wisdom Gaming Group laid off approximately 40% of its workforce in May 2023, and was reported to be in "dire financial straits". Then, in December 2023, they attempted to pivot away from professional esports teams to focus on sustainable community gaming hubs at the mall. In November 2023, Toys "R" Us opened a new flagship store at MoA as part of a strategic decision by parent companies WHP Global and Go! Retail Group. On June 26, 2024, Mall of America introduced a new facial recognition security system that would activate whenever someone would enter the mall and flag persons of interest. Visitors had mixed reactions to the new system; while some cited privacy concerns, others said it helped them feel safer in the mall. By August 2024, final reports indicated that Wisdom Gaming Studios had effectively closed its MoA location several months prior, with its subsidiary esports team, T-Wolves Gaming, also expected to disband due to changes in the NBA 2K League. Activate Games (operating as Activate Bloomington) opened in the former GameWorks space on November 7, 2024.

Announced in December of that year, Forever 21 would close permanently on January 26, 2025, after filing for Chapter 11 bankruptcy. Maurices, an original tenant, would also close permanently due to the expiration of its lease. By July 16, 2025, over two dozen new businesses would be coming to Mall of America, with Triple Five Group describing it as a "revamp". This included Primark, MINISO, NBA Store, New Balance, OG ZAZA, Victoria's Secret (as well as PINK), Pandora, and Labubu maker Pop Mart. J.Crew announced in late January 2026 that they would be officially returning to Mall of America. However, Eddie Bauer announced in early February 2026 that all of its North American locations—including Mall of America—would close permanently after the company filed for Chapter 11 bankruptcy. Eight other Minnesota locations would also be shutting down.

An Asian-themed entertainment venue, known as DUCK! opened to the public on March 15, 2026 as the largest claw machine arcade in Minnesota, featuring Japanese-themed Gacha games. Hooters, an original restaurant, announced that it would close permanently on March 22, citing economic pressures and its Chapter 11 bankruptcy filing in March 2025 that led to the chain to completely exit Minnesota. Oppa Sweets, which went viral on Instagram, would also close its doors at the end of the month to relocate at Maplewood Mall. Rolife announced on May 26, 2026, that they would open their first Minnesota flagship store at the east side of Mall of America. Transformco put the former Sears on the market on August 11, 2026.

== Attractions ==
=== Nickelodeon Universe ===
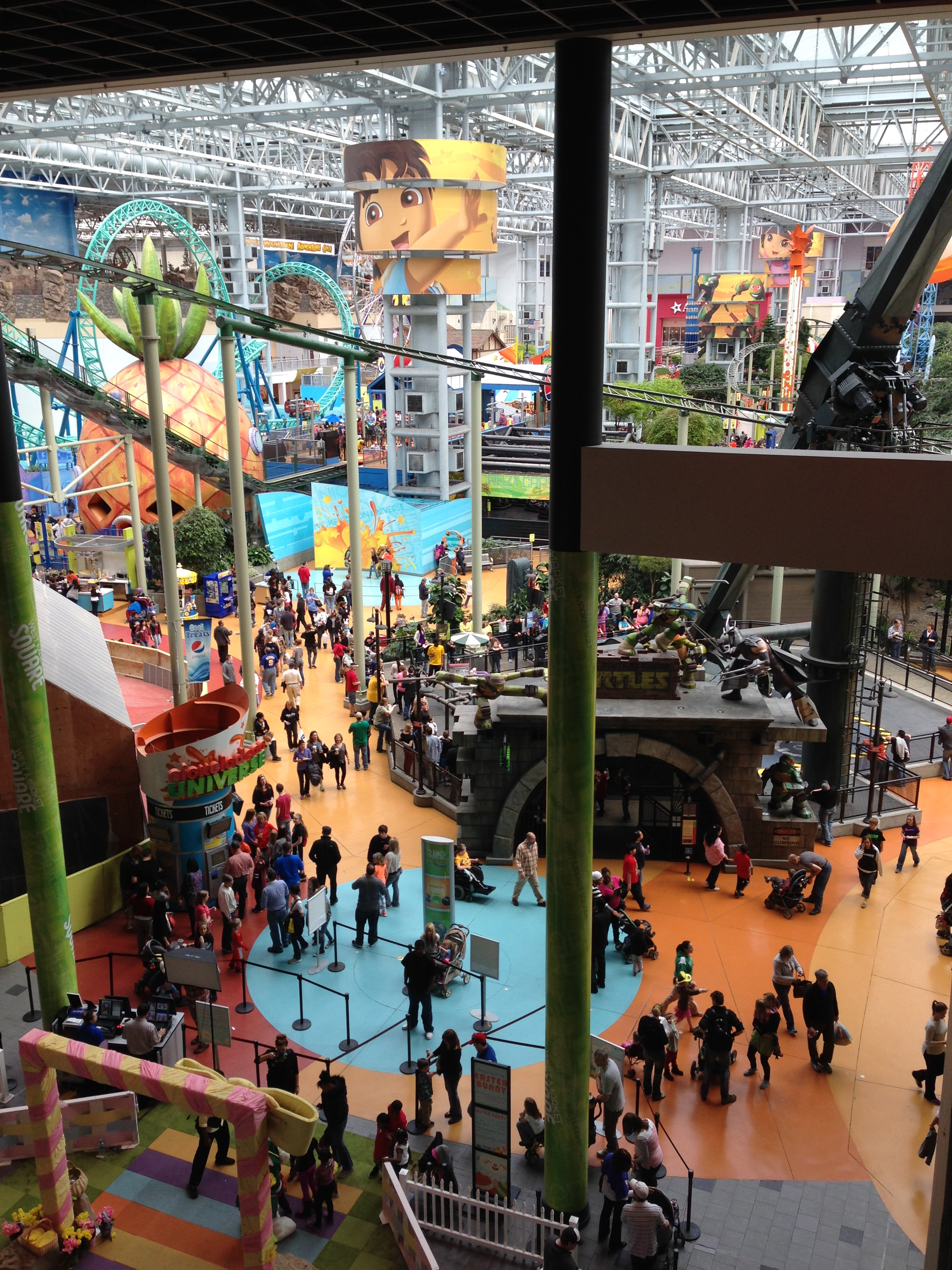
Amusement park view from third floor (April 2014)

Nickelodeon Universe Mall of America, formerly known as Knott's Camp Snoopy (1992–2005), Camp Snoopy (2005–2006), and The Park at MOA (2006–2008), is an indoor theme park in the center of the mall that opened with Nickelodeon branding in March 2008. The park features 27 rides and numerous other attractions. It is the second-largest indoor theme park in the United States, surpassed only by its sister park in the American Dream Mall in New Jersey. Unlike many indoor amusement parks, Nickelodeon Universe has a great deal of natural foliage in and around the park, and its floor has a wide variance in height – the highest ground level in the park is 15 feet (4.6 m) above the lowest.

The rides include thrill, family, and junior varieties, as well as multiple intensities of roller coasters. Among the most well-known rides are: SpongeBob SquarePants Rock Bottom Plunge, Fairly Odd Coaster, Pepsi Orange Streak, Avatar Airbender, Teenage Mutant Ninja Turtles Shell Shock, BrainSurge, the ferris wheel, El Circulo Del Cielo, and the iconic Log Chute.

Other attractions located in the park include the Double Dare Human Crane, Matrix 5D Extreme Attraction, FlyOver America, and the Xscape Entertainment Center arcade. Former attractions include the Dutchman's Deck Adventure Ropes Course, the Anchor Drop slides, and the Barnacle Blast zip line, which were closed in 2025 and torn down in September 2026. However, a Mall of America press release from the same month promises a new and refreshed Dutchman's Deck course set to open in March 2027.

Two eighteen-hole miniature golf courses are also included in Nickelodeon Universe's attraction list, but they are actually located outside the park on the third floor of the mall. Moose Mountain Adventure Golf, which overlooks the park, features a north woods theme and a relatively fast astroturf surface. Rock of Ages Blacklight Mini Golf follows popular music theming, with the course showcasing music and pop culture eras from the 1950s to the 2000s.

=== Sea Life Minnesota Aquarium ===
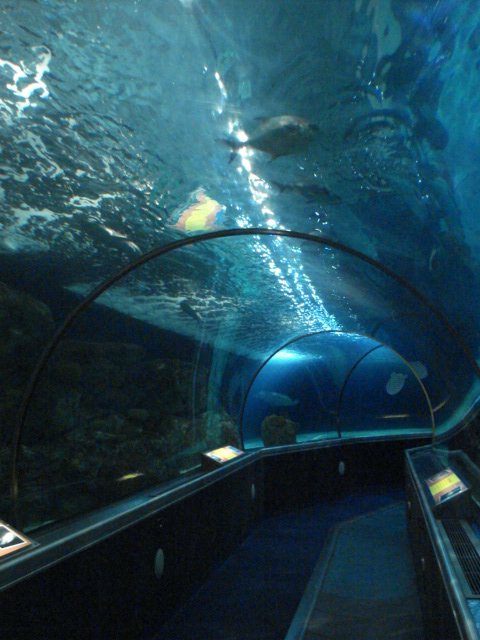
Shark tunnel (January 2007)

At the Sea Life Minnesota Aquarium (formerly Underwater World/Underwater Adventures Aquarium), guests travel through a 300-foot-long (91 m) curved tunnel through 14 feet (4.3 m) of water to view over 4,500 sea creatures including sharks, turtles, stingrays and many more. Sea Life Minnesota Aquarium offers special events such as sleepovers, scuba diving, snorkeling and birthday parties.

== Artifacts and memorials ==
- A stadium seat commemorating the longest home run at Metropolitan Stadium, hit by Minnesota Twins player Harmon Killebrew on June 3, 1967. The seat is painted red and bolted to a wall to mark the exact height and position at which the ball landed in the upper-deck seats.
- A plaque embedded in the floor of Nickelodeon Universe, marking the spot of the home plate at Metropolitan Stadium.
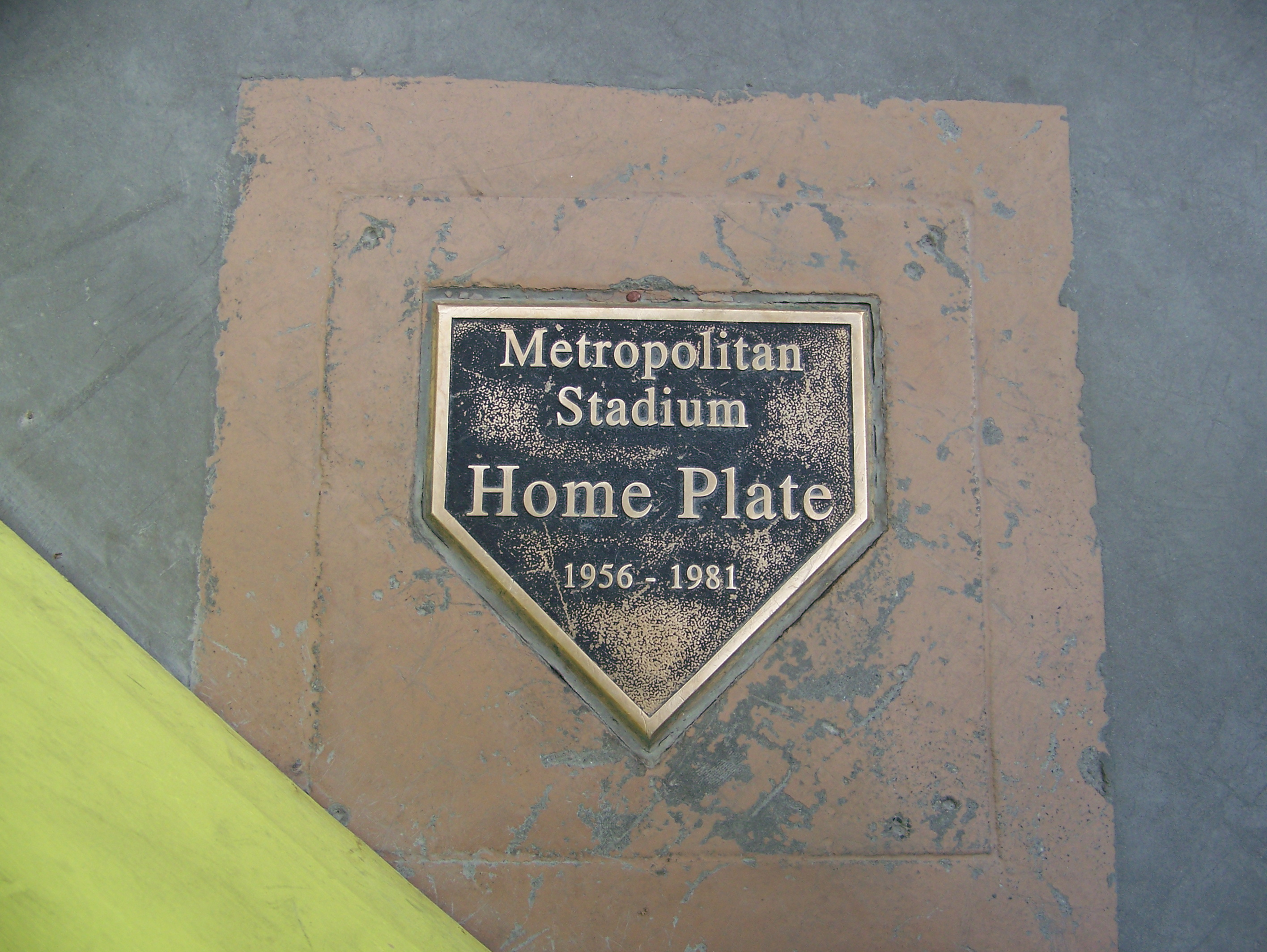
  The home plate plaque in Nickelodeon Universe (February 2008)
- A second plaque was added to the floor of Nickelodeon Universe in 2018, marking the spot on the 50-yard line at Metropolitan Stadium that was used for the coin toss before every Minnesota Vikings home game played there.
  The 50 yard line in Nickelodeon Universe (May 2018)
- The United Airlines Flight 93 memorial, in honor of those who died aboard that flight during the September 11 attacks. A memorial of Tom Burnett (who was born and raised in Bloomington) stands on the west side of the first floor, next to the fountain in front of Nordstrom.

== Transit station ==
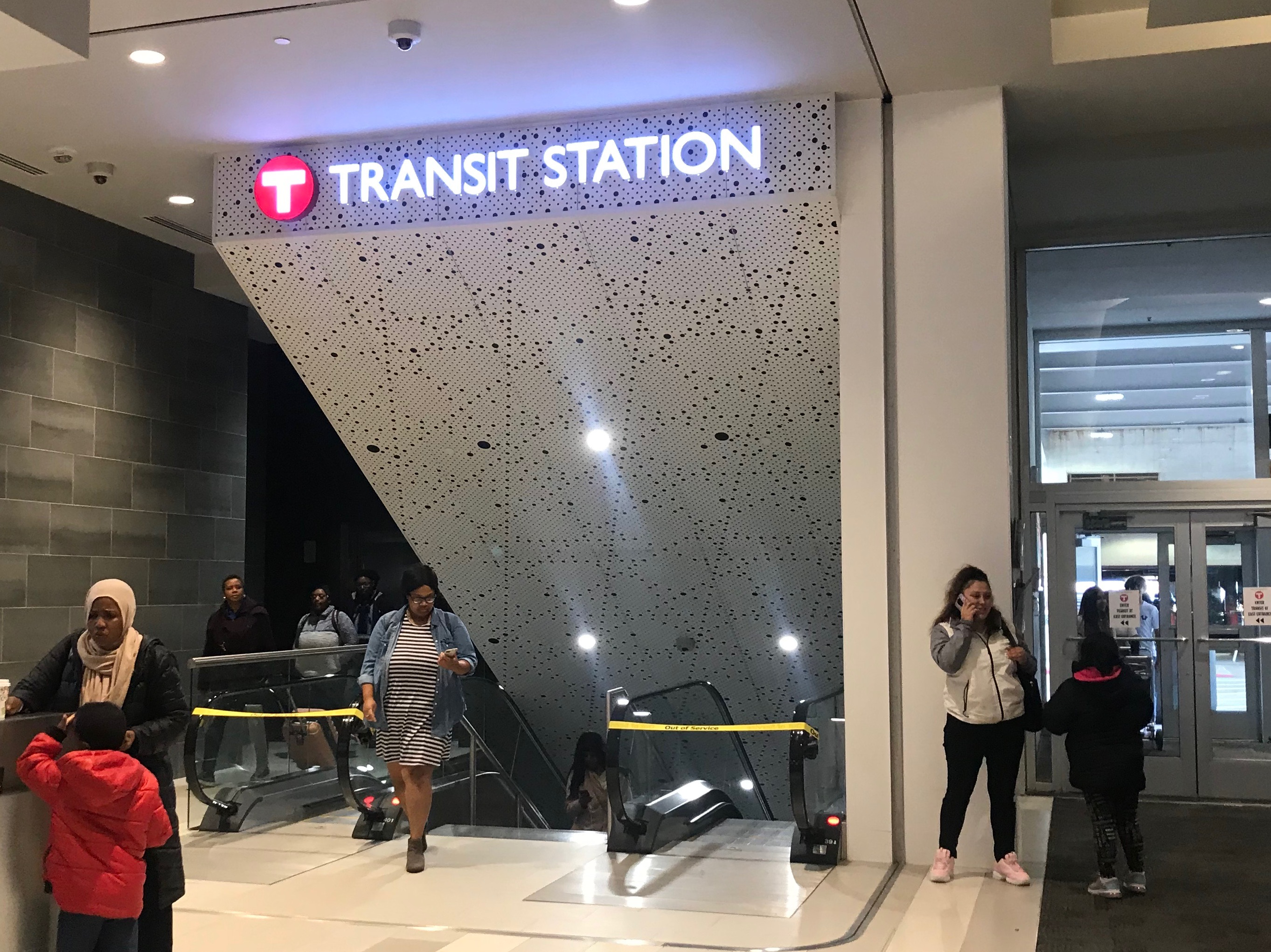
The mall entrance to the transit station

In the lower level of the eastern parking ramp is the Mall of America station, the busiest transit hub in Minnesota with services to and from many destinations in the Minneapolis–Saint Paul metropolitan area. The Transit Station contains two stops on the Metro Network: the southern terminus of the METRO Blue Line (light rail) to Downtown Minneapolis via MSP Airport and Hiawatha Avenue (operated by Metro Transit), and the northern terminus of the METRO Red Line (bus rapid transit) to Apple Valley. The indoor waiting area at Mall of America Transit Station is open daily from 6 a.m. to 10 p.m. Metro Transit and the MVTA also operate many local bus services to the Transit Station and many area hotels along with the Mystic Lake Casino Hotel offer free shuttles to their establishments.

The mall is not a park and ride facility, and overnight parking is banned to prevent passengers taking the train to the airport. Commuters are required to use the nearby 30th Avenue station's parking ramp. The station underwent a $25 million upgrade which was completed in October 2019.

== Notable incidents ==
=== Security personnel ===
Behavior Detection Officers (BDOs) are trained in Israel, each one going through at least 240 hours of training. As Doug Reynolds, the former Security Director at the mall noted in a congressional testimony in 2008, BDOs are taught to "look for intent, rather than means. The objective is to focus on suspicious indicators in three categories: People, vehicles, and unattended items like backpacks, shopping bags, and suitcases." This methodology has prepared the mall for a variety of threats, both from terrorists and everyday criminals.

In September 2011, the Star Tribune reported that mall security officials were instructed to question or detain individuals exhibiting what they deemed "suspicious behavior". Signs of suspicious behavior included photographing air-conditioning ducts, or signs that a shopper was hiding something. At the time, some officials within the Bloomington Police Department worried that the mall's security methods may infringe peoples' rights.

In 2011, NPR's All Things Considered and Morning Edition and PBS's NewsHour both aired programs documenting security abuses by the mall's security personnel. On December 31, 2013, members from the First Nations protest movement Idle No More attempted to repeat a successful Native-American round dance held at the mall in 2012, but failed after being stopped by mall security. Organizers of the dance, Patricia Shepard and Reyna Crow from Duluth were arrested on site for trespassing.

=== Protests ===
On December 21, 2014, thousands of protesters attended an unauthorized demonstration organized by Black Lives Matter in the mall's rotunda. The demonstration was in response to the shooting of Michael Brown in Ferguson, Missouri and the then recent jury decision not to prosecute the white officer in that case, as well as the death of Eric Garner of New York. In response to the demonstration, the Mall of America closed the areas of the mall around the rotunda. Police arrested 25 demonstrators. The Bloomington City Attorney, Sandra Johnson, pursued charges against the organizers, and the city is sought compensatory damages from some of the organizers for out-of-pocket costs the city incurred while paying overtime for additional security. In response to these charges, demonstrators have called for a boycott of the mall.

Plans for another Black Lives Matter demonstration at the Mall of America on December 23, 2015, prompted mall officials to file a restraining order against the movement's activists. Eight individual activists were sued in Hennepin County District Court. The mall's lawsuit would prohibit the defendants from demonstrating and require them to delete all of their posts to social media pertaining to the demonstration. The lawsuit additionally asked that the court jail Black Lives Matter activists unless they publicly announce that the demonstration is cancelled on their social media accounts. The American Civil Liberties Union of Minnesota called the mall's lawsuit an "improper prior restraint on speech" and an unconstitutional overreach.

=== Spring 2019 murder attempt ===
On April 12, 2019, a five-year-old boy was thrown from the third-story balcony by 24-year-old Emmanuel Deshawn Aranda of Minneapolis, outside the Rainforest Cafe, and landed near the Michael Kors store. The boy was in the hospital for over five months, but eventually recovered. Aranda was sentenced to 19 years in prison in June of that year with the possibility for parole after 12 years.

=== Fall 2026 foiled terror plot ===
On October 6, 2026, FBI agents thwarted an ISIS-inspirated terrorist attack on the Mall of America after agents arrested an 18-year-old Richfield, Minnesota, man at a public dog park in his hometown after obtaining an AK-47 assault-style rifle and 200 rounds of ammunition from an undercover FBI employee, leading to his arrest at a nearby parking lot. Authorities said that the suspect, Sheikhdoon Abdullahi Mohamud (born April 24, 2008), planned a mass shooting at the Hmong Arts Celebration that was scheduled in the mall later that month. Earlier in July 2026, Mohamud sent messages discussing his intent to carry out a terrorist attack at the Mall of America because he claimed that the mall was "owned by Jews".

According to a complaint by the FBI, Mohamud, a Richfield resident and American-born U.S. citizen of Somali descent whose family moved to the United States from the New York City area in 2000, had been under FBI investigation since December 2024, who repeatedly expressed his admiration for Islamic terrorist attacks, and repeatedly expressed an intent to carry out an attack targeting non-Muslims. Minnesota US attorney Daniel N. Rosen and FBI Minneapolis special agent in charge Christopher Dotson discussed the case that Mohamud carried out his intention to kill around 30 to 60 people once he allegedly "expressed his desire to travel to Somalia" to join Al-Shabaab. Court documents also note Mohamud sent a video source on Discord showing him allegedly pledged allegiance to ISIS. Following his arrest, Mohamud was federally charged with one count of knowingly receiving a firearm and ammunition in order to commit a federal crime of terrorism, and appeared in court at the Warren E. Burger Federal Building in Saint Paul for an eight-minute initial hearing delivered by a federal magistrate judge on the day after his arrest.

== In media ==
The Mall of America was used as a filming location for various movies and television shows, including:

- D2: The Mighty Ducks (1994)
- D3: The Mighty Ducks (1996)
- Hosted the first episode of WCW Monday Nitro on September 4, 1995.
- Jingle All the Way (1996)
- You're Invited to Mary-Kate & Ashley's Mall Party (1997)
- Mall Masters (2001)
- Viva la Bam (2003–2006)
- Mall Cops: Mall of America (2010)
- The End of the Tour (2015)

The mall was referenced in the series How I Met Your Mother during the episode "Slap Bet" as the reason why native Minnesotan Marshall Eriksen believed that Robin Scherbatsky would have been married in a mall; this is a reference to the Chapel of Love in the mall, which closed in August 2022. The mall was the location of the premiere of Digimon: The Movie (2000) and the 30th anniversary screening of The Godfather (1972).

== Photo gallery ==
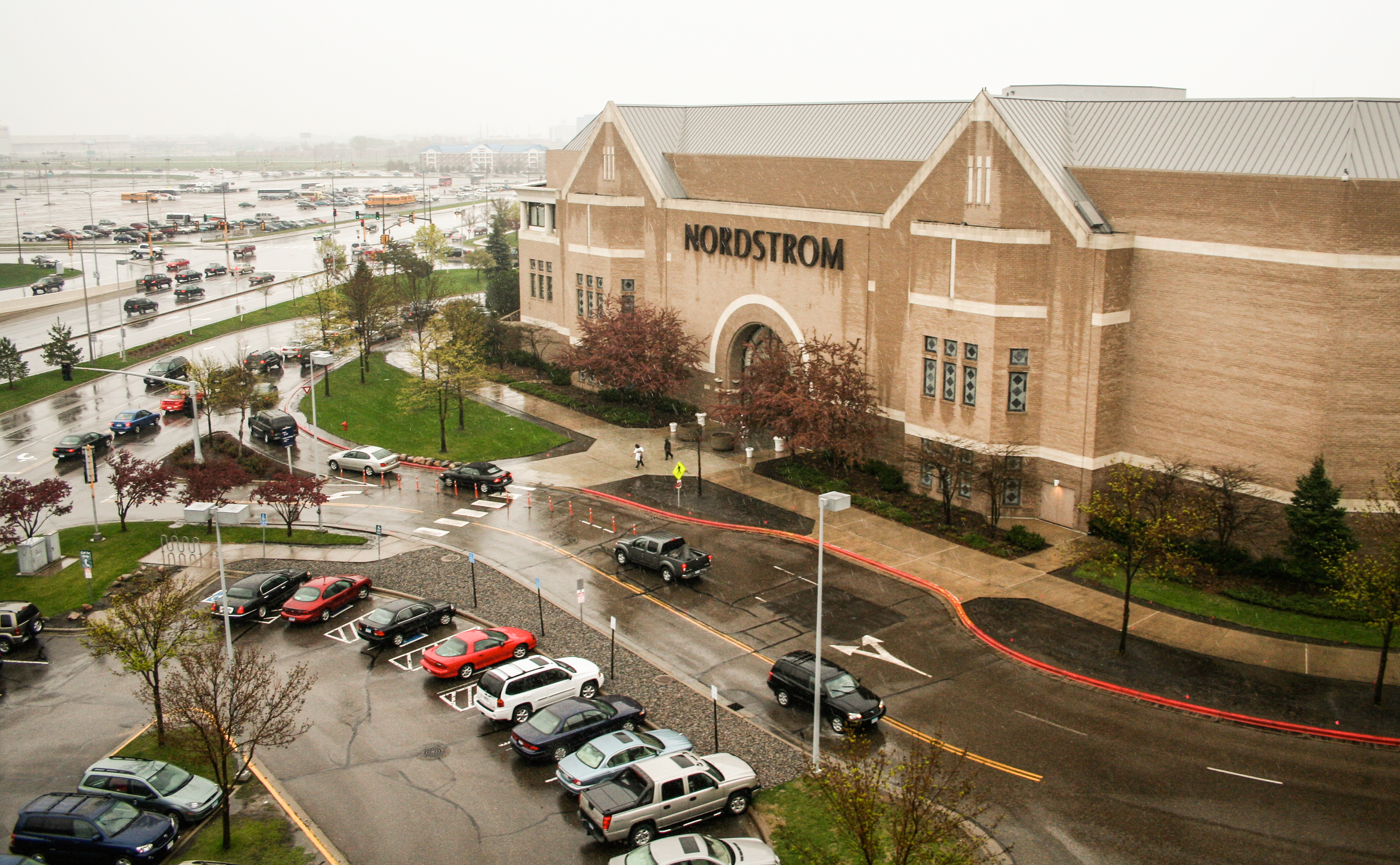
Nordstrom (April 2006)

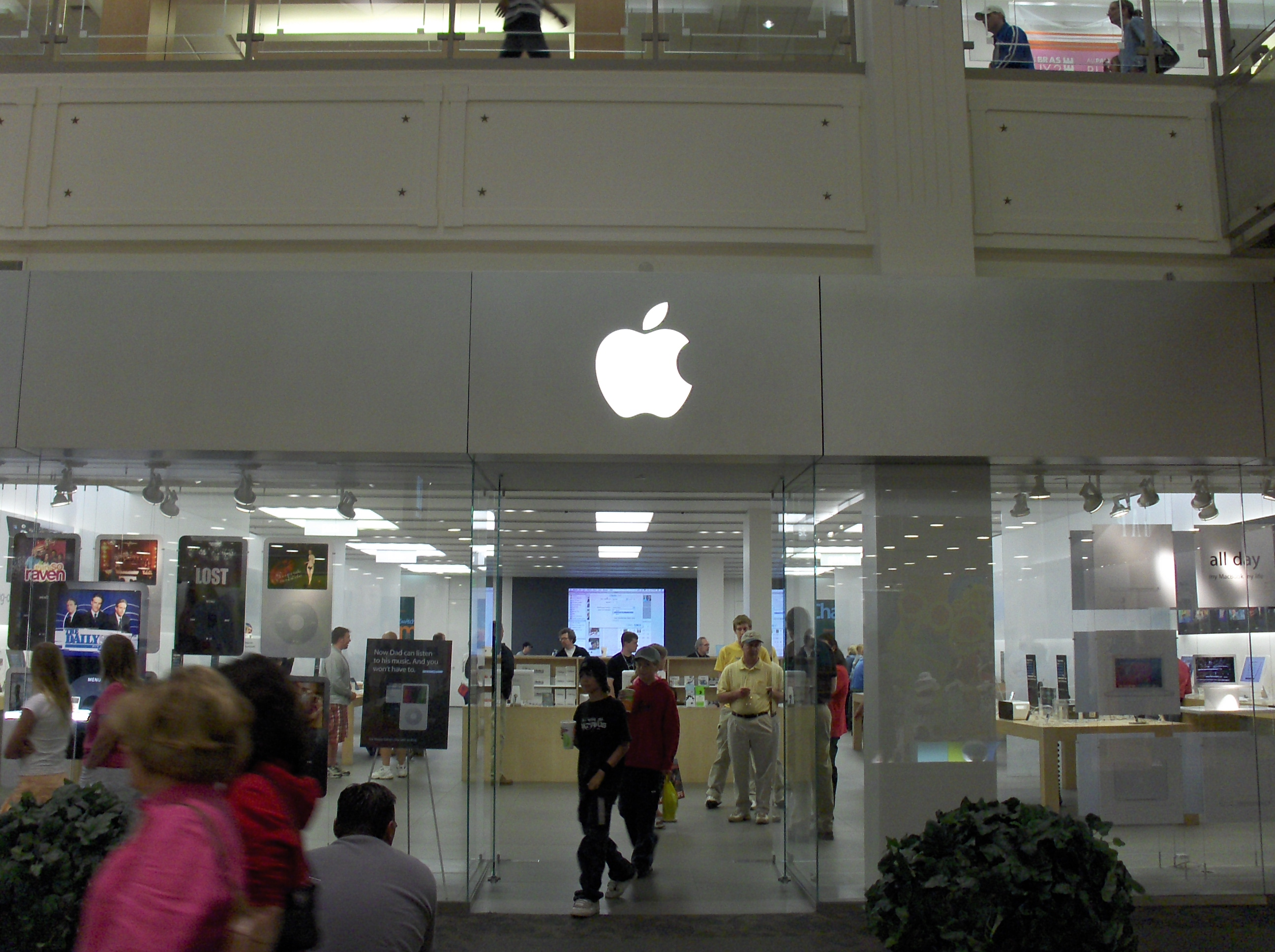
Apple Store (June 2006)

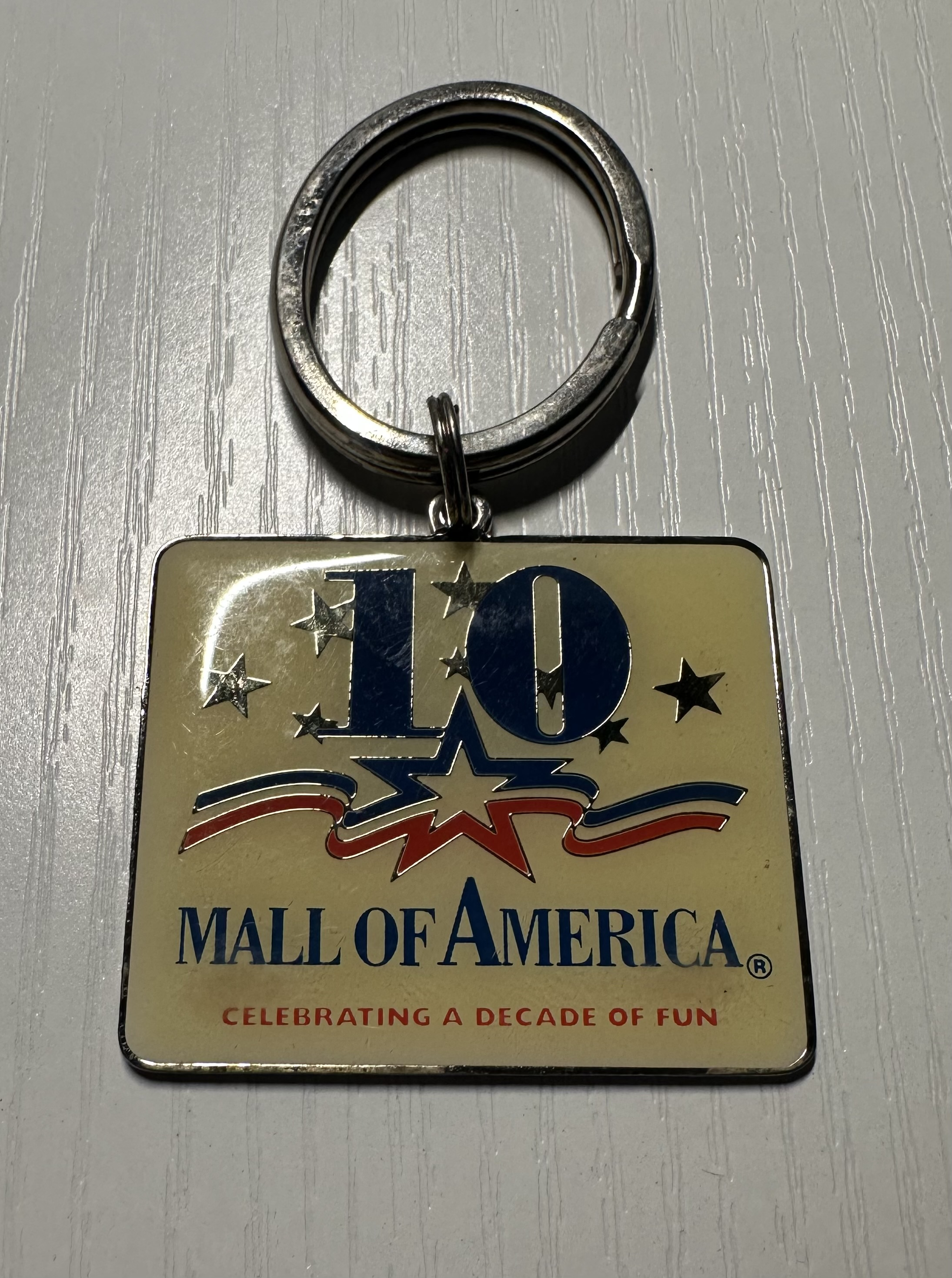
Vintage badge celebrating the mall's 10th anniversary

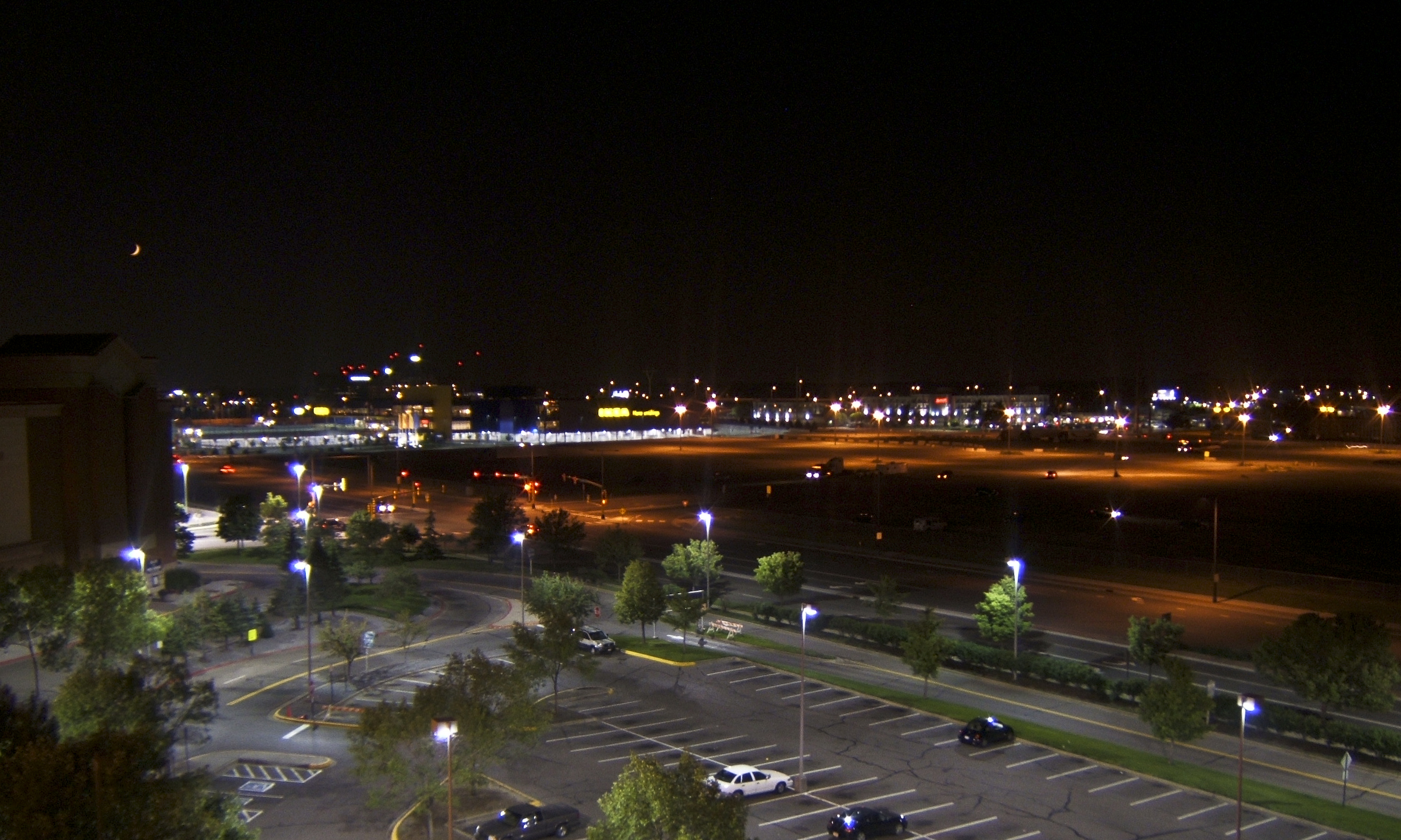
Parking lot at night (July 2005)

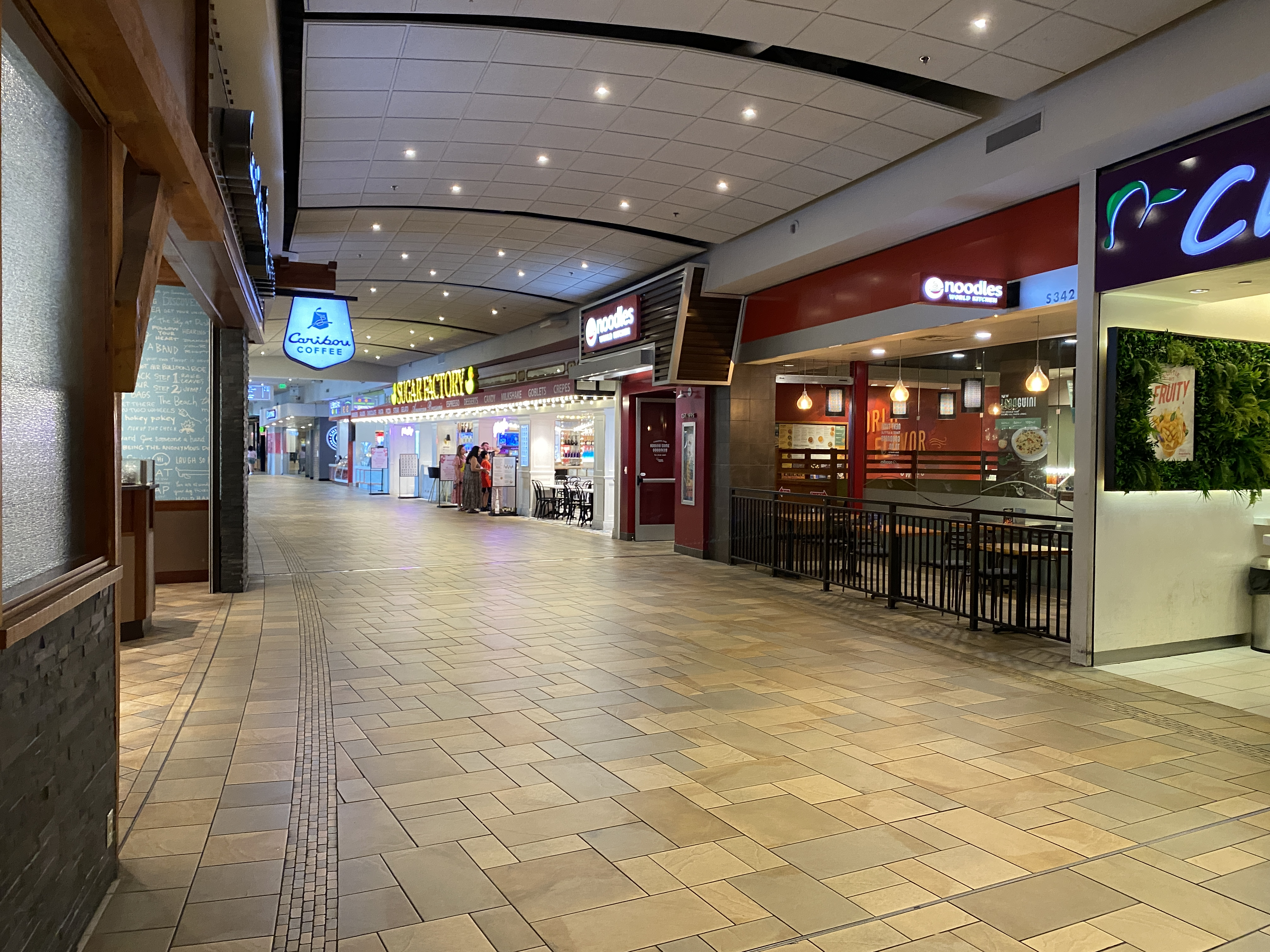
Concourse (August 2022)

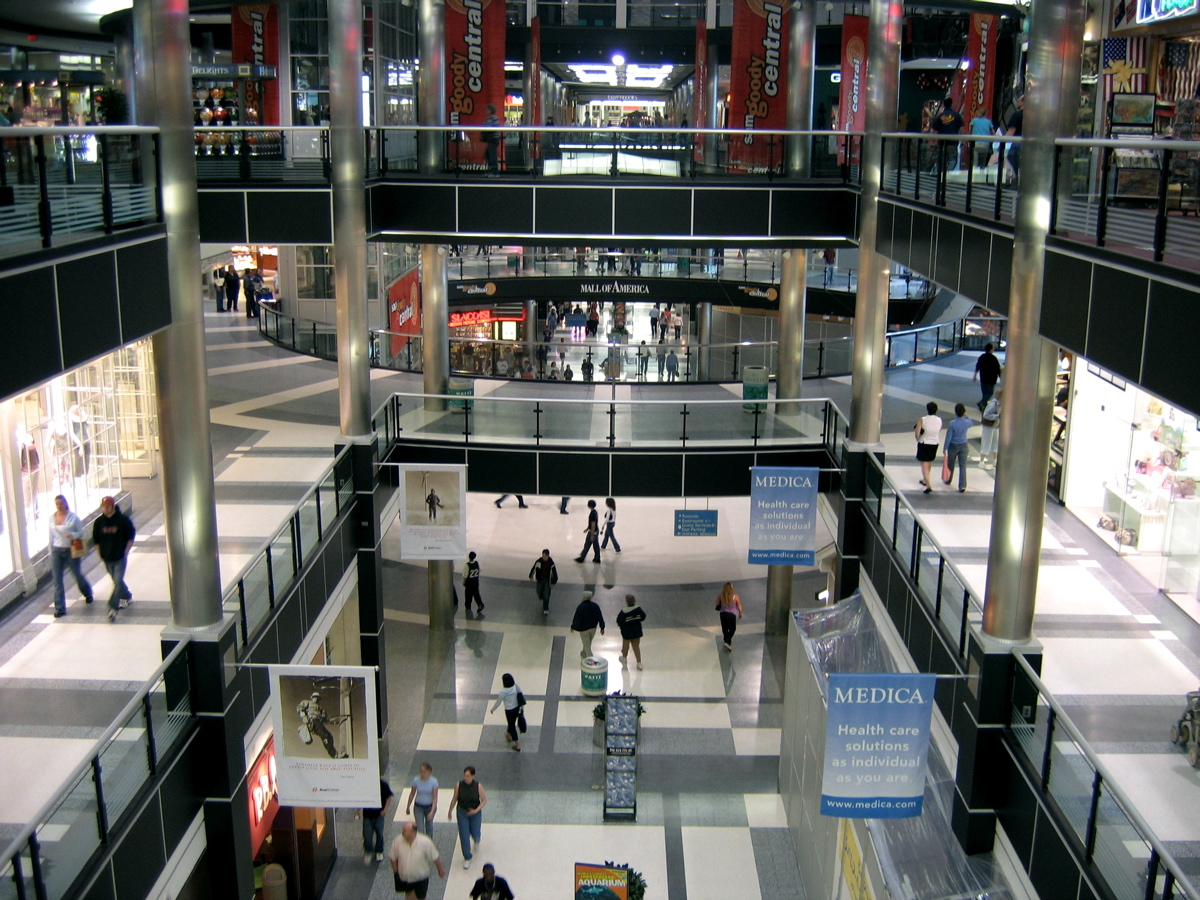
Another image of Mall of America prior to renovations (May 2005)

== See also ==
- Fashion Centre at Pentagon City, a four-story shopping mall in Arlington, Virginia also developed by Simon Property Group in a similar architectural style as Mall of America
- Hmongtown Marketplace, an ethnic Hmong shopping center and cultural hub located in Saint Paul nicknamed "Hmong Mall of America" for its large size
- List of largest shopping malls in the United States
- List of largest shopping malls in the world
- Sawgrass Mills, the largest outlet mall in the United States and the 12th largest shopping mall in the United States
- Southdale Center, another significant shopping mall in Minnesota as the first enclosed mall in the United States. Simon Property Group continues to own and operate this property.
