= DLR Group =

Integrated design firm in Nebraska, US

- Type: Employee-owned
- Industry: Architecture
- Founded: 1966; 60 years ago
- Headquarters: Omaha, Nebraska, U.S.
- Services: architecture, engineering, planning, interior design
- Revenue: $280 Million (FY 2020)
- Number of employees: 1,800
- Website: www.dlrgroup.com

DLR Group is an employee-owned integrated design firm providing architecture, engineering, planning and interior design. Their brand promise is to elevate the human experience through design. A self-described advocate for sustainable design, the firm was an early adopter of the Architecture 2030 Challenge, and an initial signatory to the AIA 2030 Commitment and the China Accord.

== History ==
DLR Group, named for architects Irving Dana, Bill Larson and engineer Jim Roubal, was founded on April 1, 1966, in Omaha, Nebraska, as Dana Larson Roubal and Associates, after leaving Leo A Daly to start their own firm. The name was changed to DLR Group in 1996.

The company has carried out a series of acquisitions, including purchases of Lescher & Mahoney of Phoenix in 1974; John Graham and Co. of Seattle, architects behind the Space Needle, in 1986; Newman, Cavendar & Doane of Denver in 2007; KKE Architects of Minneapolis, who were involved in the construction of Mall of America, WWCOT of Los Angeles in 2010; and Sorg Architects of Washington, D.C., in 2015. In the summer of 2021, the company added healthcare focused firms Salus Architecture in Seattle, Wright McGraw Beyers Architects in Charlotte, North Carolina, as well as K12 focused firms BakerNowicki Design Studio in San Diego, California and Bowie Gridley Architects in Washington. Currently, the firm has 36 locations across the globe.

In 1978, DLR Group implemented an employee stock ownership program, which resulted in the firm becoming 100% employee owned in 2005.

The firm is currently led by CEO Steven McKay, RIBA.

In 2026, DLR Group held a contract with Oklahoma Department of Corrections. After staff feedback and communication, the heads of the company told staff that DLR Group "will not do work to expand the portfolio of facilities that private providers own and operate with a fiduciary interest in promoting actions that increase the use of incarceration."

== Services ==
DLR Group follows an integrated design model of design and building delivery. The firm has experience in the development of Civic, Cultural and Performing Arts, Federal, Healthcare, Higher Education, Hospitality, Justice, K-12 Education, Mixed-Use, Sports, Transportation and Workplace projects. Their services offered include architecture, engineering, interiors, planning, acoustical design, experiential graphic design, high performance design, landscape architecture, lighting design, preservation, reality capture, lab design, and theater planning.

DLR Group is an organization that focuses on sustainable construction, and adheres to the United States' LEED building design program and was an early adopter of solar hot water, renewable energy creation and geothermal systems.

== Recognitions ==
DLR Group was ranked #1 in ARCHITECT's Top 50 ranking of U.S. design firms in 2012, and has appeared on the list each year since 2010.

2014 AIA COTE Top Ten and LEED Platinum Certification for the Wayne N. Aspinall Federal Building.

2015 AIA Healthcare Design Award for the Cleveland Clinic Brunswick Emergency Department.

2017 American Architecture Award for Missouri Innovation Campus in Lee's Summit, Missouri.

2018 AIA COTE Top Ten for The Smithsonian American Art Museum's Renwick Gallery restoration.

2020 American Architecture Award for the Triumph multifamily housing facility.

2021 American Architecture Award for the Portland Building.

2021 American Architecture Award for the Shenzhen Opera House.

== Notable Projects ==
- Museum of Science and History (MOSH)
- Cleveland Museum of Natural History
- Museum at Bethel Wood (Woodstock)
- The Pennsylvania Academy of the Fine Arts in Philadelphia.
- Maltz Performing Arts Center renovation
- The Portland Building renovation
- Pittsburgh Playhouse renovation
- St. Joseph's Health Amphitheater
- Murphy Arts District
- Playhouse Square
- Balboa Theater
- Tennessee Theater
- Oberlin College and Conservatory of Music
- SAFE Credit Union Performing Arts Center
- Straz Center for the Performing Arts
- Multiple facilities for the Cleveland Clinic
- University of Florida Institute of Black Culture and Institute of Hispanic-Latino Cultures
- Cascade Hotel in Kansas City, Missouri
- Mall of America expansions, and a planned waterpark addition
- Canyon View High School
- Compton High School
- Los Angeles Memorial Coliseum renovation
- Equity Bank Park in Wichita, Kansas
- TDECU Stadium
- CHI Health Center Omaha
- SkyLink (Los Angeles International Airport)
- Chinatown station (Muni Metro)
- Canopy by Hilton Minneapolis Mills
- Kimpton Cottonwood Hotel
- St. Nicholas Greek Orthodox Church lighting design
- Buruj Hotel in Baghdad

== Locations ==
DLR Group currently has 40 locations across the globe.

36 offices are within the United States of America:

- Atlanta, Georgia
- Austin, Texas
- Boston, Massachusetts
- Charlotte, North Carolina
- Chicago, Illinois
- Cleveland, Ohio
- Columbus, Ohio
- Dallas, Texas
- Denver, Colorado
- Des Moines, Iowa
- Durham, North Carolina
- Fort Worth, Texas
- Honolulu, Hawaii
- Houston, Texas
- Kansas City, Kansas
- Las Vegas, Nevada
- Lincoln, Nebraska
- Los Angeles, California
- Minneapolis, Minnesota
- Nashville, Tennessee
- New York, New York
- Omaha, Nebraska
- Orlando, Florida
- Phoenix, Arizona
- Portland, Oregon
- Riverside, California
- Sacramento, California
- San Diego - Downtown, California
- San Diego - La Jolla, California
- San Francisco, California
- Seattle, Washington
- Sonoma, California
- Tucson, Arizona
- West Palm Beach, Florida
- Washington, D.C.

There are four offices outside the United States, located in Europe, the United Arab Emirates and China:

- Dubai
- Hong Kong
- London
- Shanghai
