= Missus =

Missus may signify

- The spoken pronunciation of Mrs., often jocular or in dialect
- Missus dominicus, an "envoy of the lord" in Frankish court culture.

== See also ==
- Miss (disambiguation)
- Mister (disambiguation)
- MRS (disambiguation)
- MS (disambiguation)
