= KKE Architects =

Defunct American architecture firm

KKE Architects, Inc.
- Industry: Architecture, architectural planning, interior design
- Founded: 1968; 58 years ago
- Key people: Board of Directors: Founder Jerry Korsunsky; Ron Erickson, chairman; Tom Gerster, president/COO; Greg Hollenkamp, CEO; Brian Arial, director; Mohammed Lawal, associate director; Randy Lindemann, senior associate; Quin Scott, secretary, senior associate; Ron Krank, advisor
- Number of employees: 135
- Website: www.dlrgroup.com

KKE Architects, Inc. (formerly Korsunsky Krank Erickson Architects) was an architecture firm that serves in the fields of architecture, interior design and architectural planning. KKE was ranked one of the top 50 architectural firms in the United States by Building Design & Construction and a Top 500 Design Firm by Engineering News-Record. They had offices in Minneapolis, Minnesota, Pasadena, California, Irvine, California, Phoenix, Arizona, Tucson, Arizona and Las Vegas, Nevada. KKE had licensure in every state of the United States. Staff architects are members of the American Institute of Architects and several hold National Council of Architectural Registration Boards (NCARB) certification and Leadership in Energy and Environmental Design (LEED) accreditation.

In July 2010, KKE Architects announced it was joining national design firm DLR Group. KKE offices in Minneapolis; Las Vegas; Tucson; and Pasadena and Irvine, California were merged into DLR Group and operate today as DLR Group.

== History ==
Jerry Korsunsky and Ron Krank met at the University of Minnesota in 1956. Korsunsky was a registered architect with the physical plant department, and Krank was a student worker. The two men met a second time at Ellerbe Architects in 1959. In 1960, Krank started working for Victor Gruen Associates, the creators of the regional mall concept, and acquired his shopping mall experience. In 1968, Korsunsky and Krank decided to form a partnership.

While working on the Point of France Condominiums in 1973, Ron Erickson answered an ad for a key project manager. Korsunsky and Krank liked that Erickson was artistic (he showed them his water colors) and had great energy and enthusiasm, so they hired him. Erickson became a partner in the firm in 1977, and the company became known as Korsunsky Krank Erickson Architects. Korsunsky retired in 1991, and Krank retired in 2001. The firm officially became KKE Architects in 2001. Korsunsky died at the age of 83 on March 30, 2009.
