= Miss (disambiguation) =

Miss is an English-language honorific title, typically for an unmarried woman.

Miss or MISS may also refer to:

- MISS or Man in Space Soonest, a U.S. Airforce space program that eventually became Project Mercury
- Miss., the traditional abbreviation for Mississippi
- Miss Press, an imprint of VDM Publishing
- The Miss or Wide Right, a missed Super Bowl field goal attempt for the Buffalo Bills in 1991
- Microbially induced sedimentary structure or MISS, a sedimentary structure formed by the interaction of microbes with sediment
- MISS, the four-letter code for the Mississippi National River and Recreation Area in Minnesota

== See also ==
- Cache miss
- Miss Universe, a beauty pageant
- Miss World, a beauty pageant
- Misses (disambiguation)
- Missing (disambiguation)
- Mistress (form of address)
- Missy
